= Santa Clara County, California =

County in California, United States

Santa Clara County South Bay San Jose–Sunnyvale–Santa Clara, CA MSA
- County and metropolitan statistical area
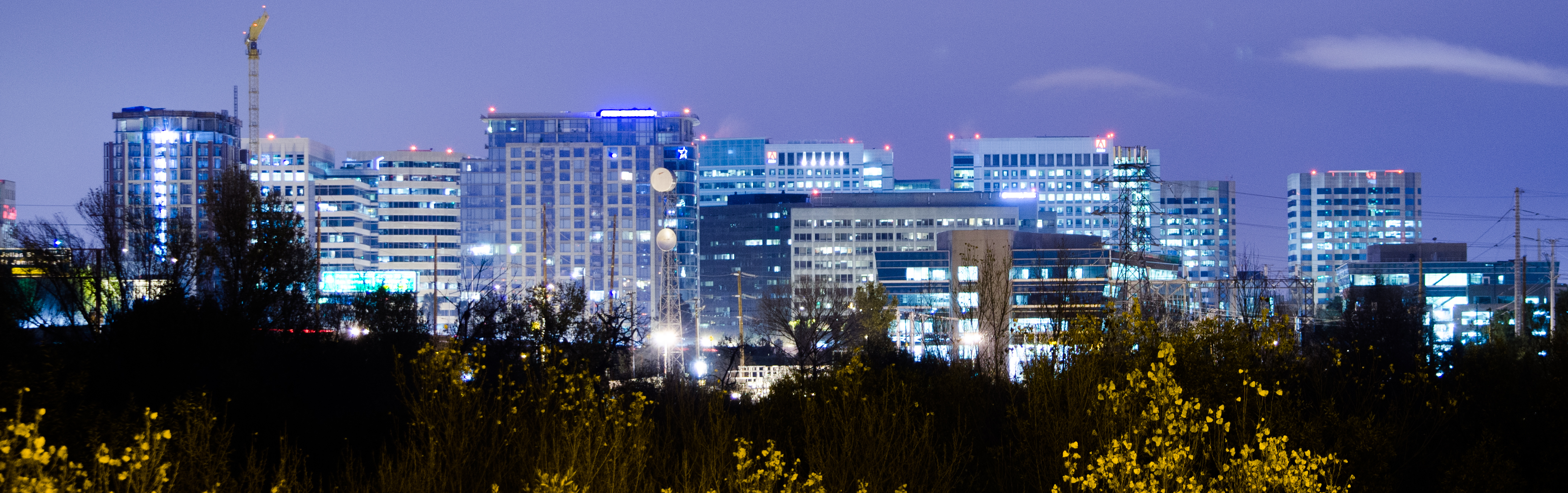
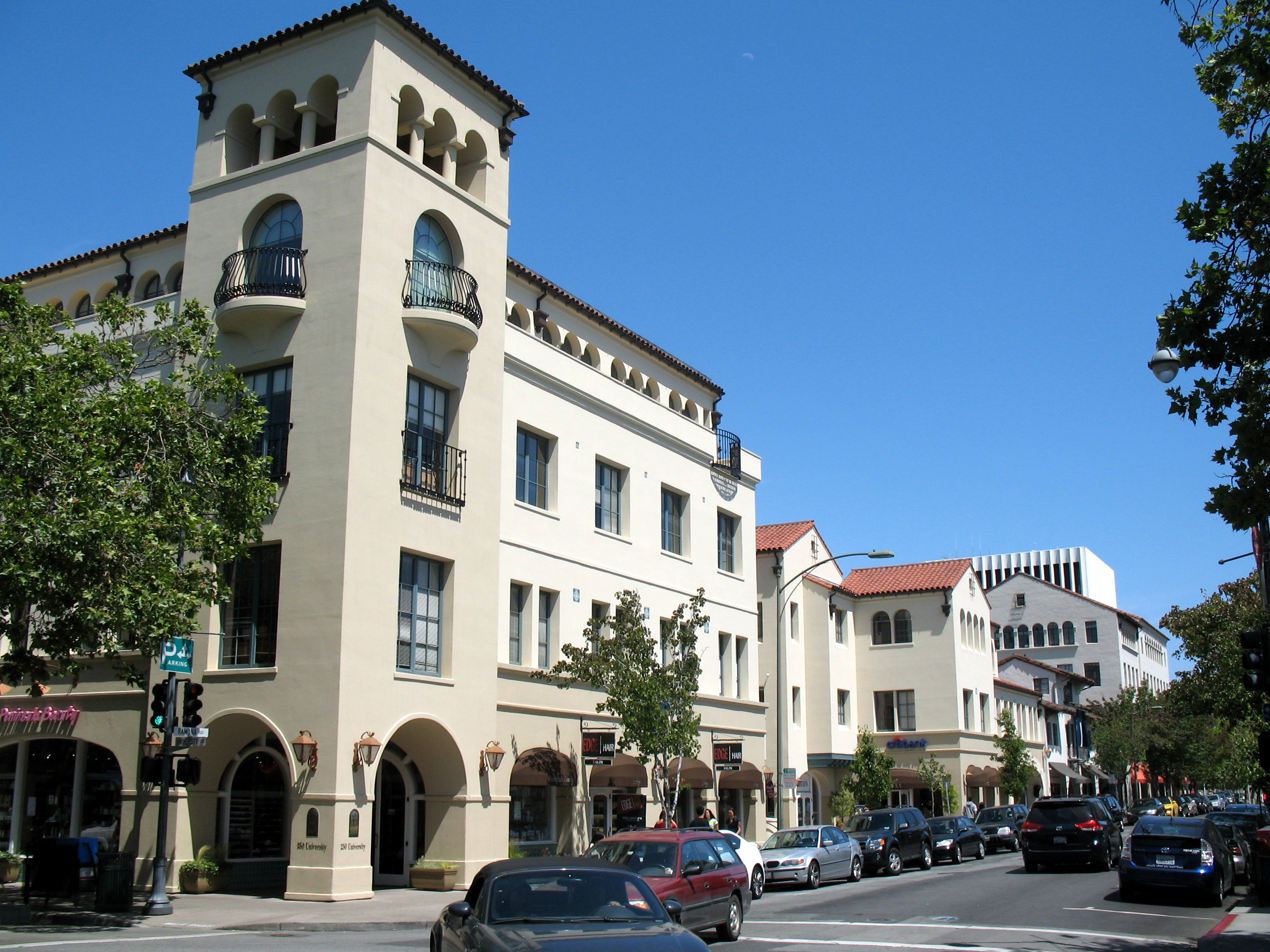
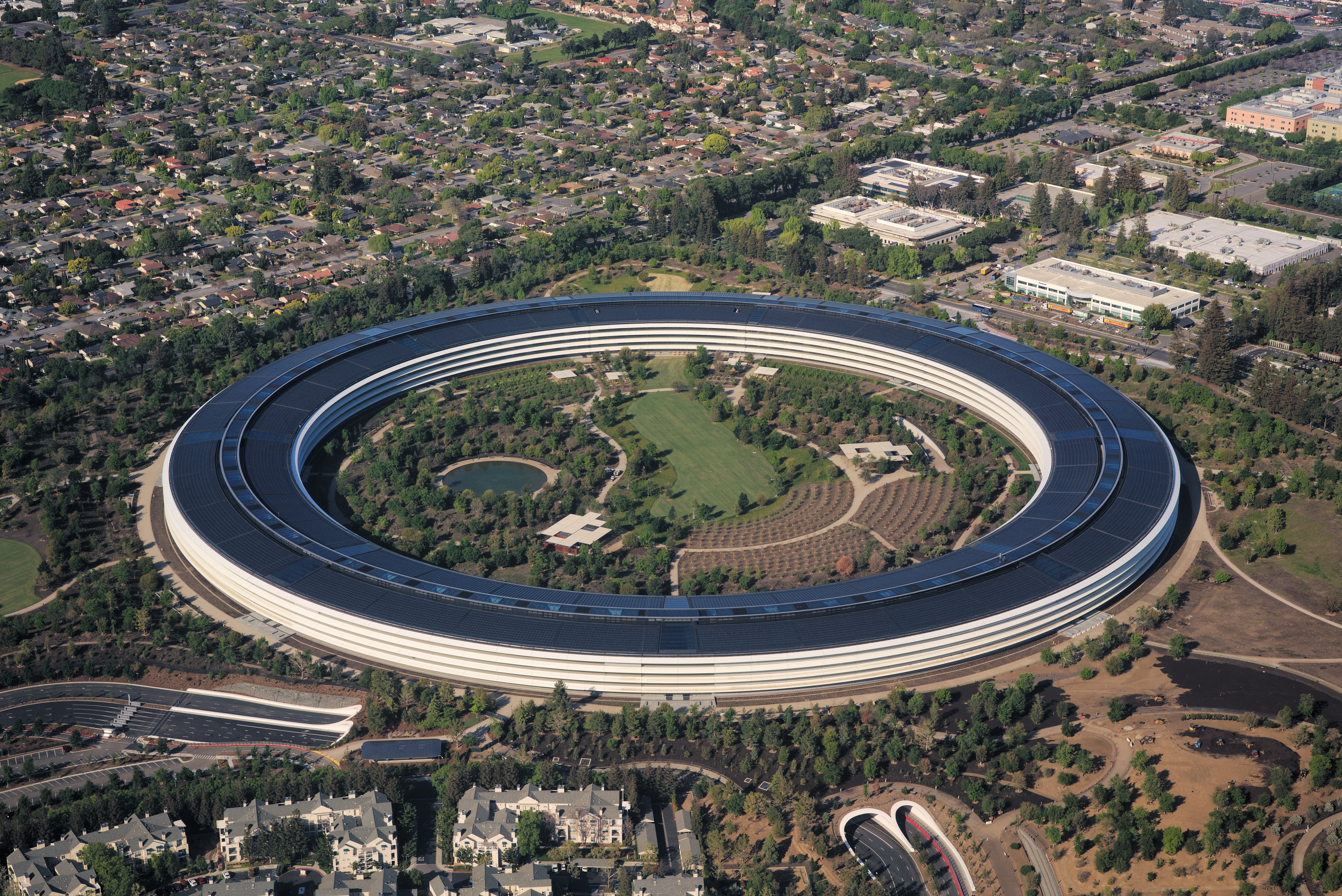
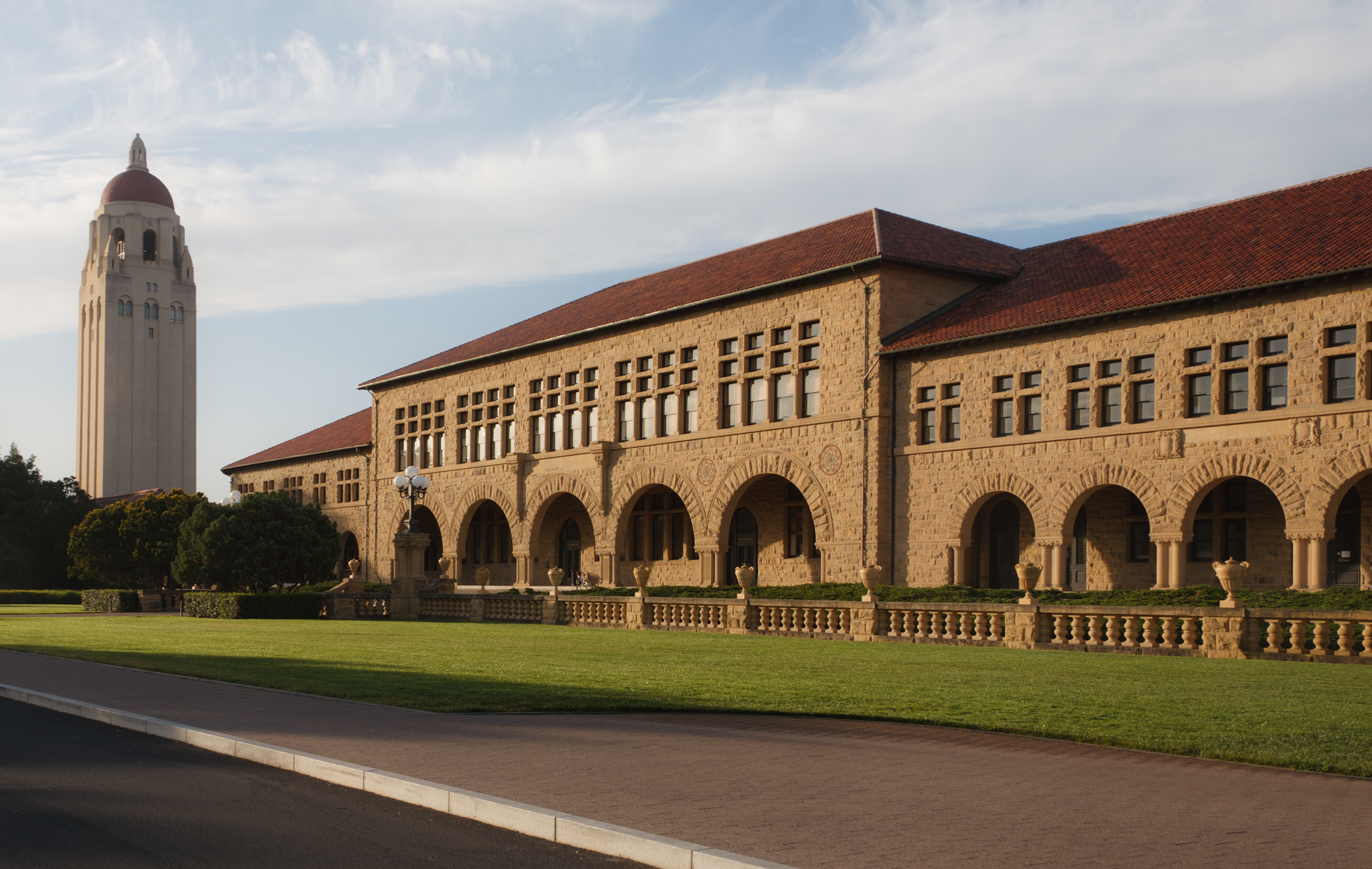
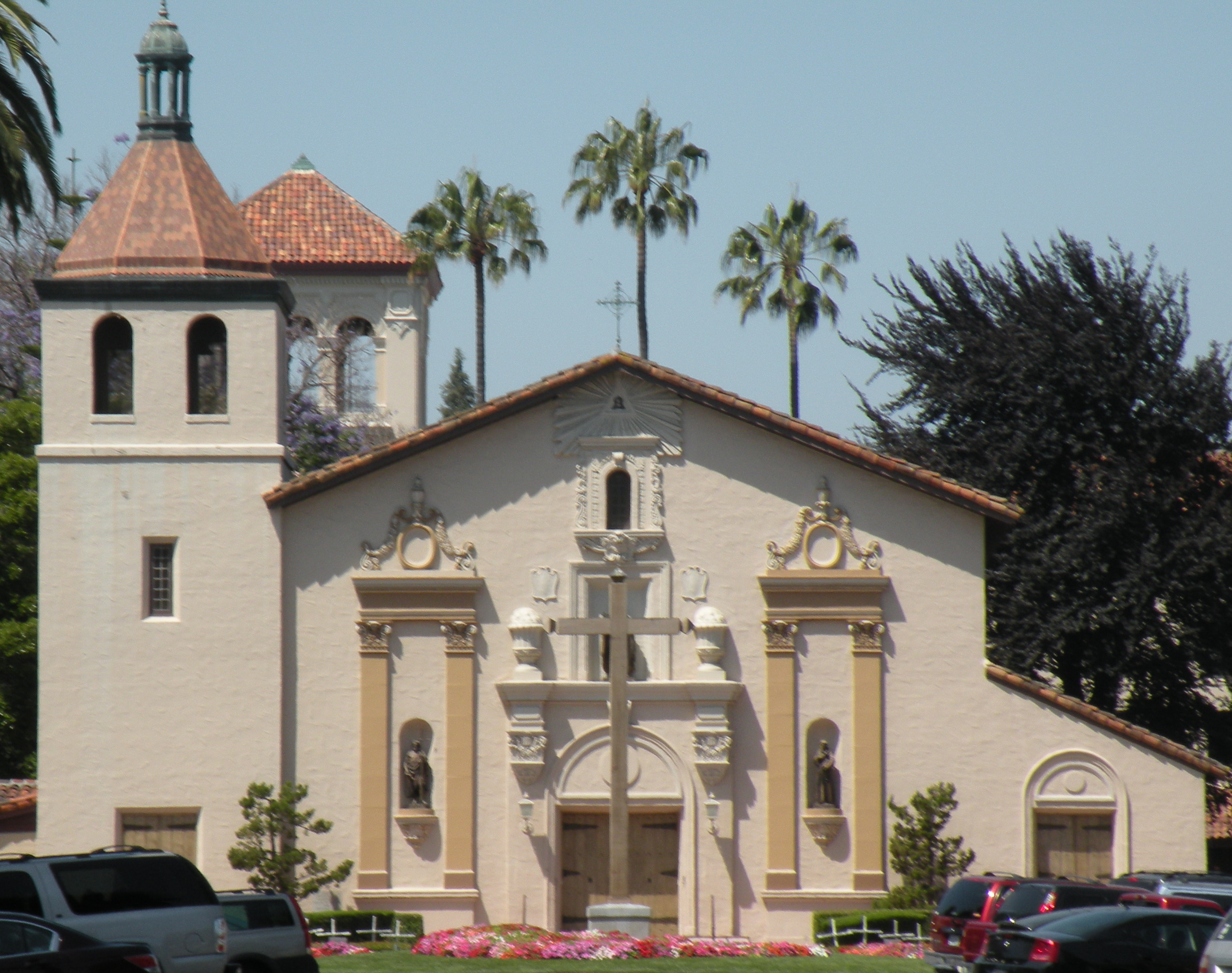
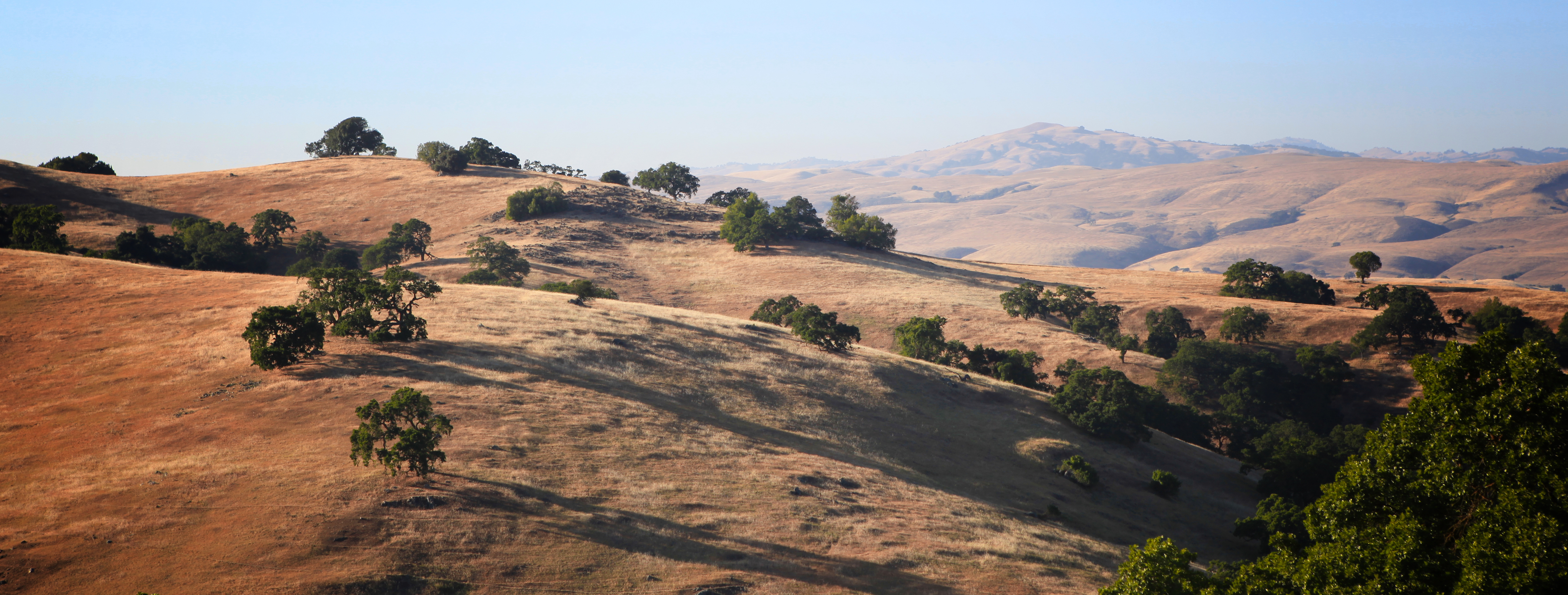
- San Jose Palo Alto Cupertino Stanford Santa Clara Santa Cruz Mountains in Morgan Hill

- Flag Seal
- Interactive map of Santa Clara County
- Location in the state of California
- Coordinates: 37°14′N 121°43′W
- Country: United States
- State: California
- Region: San Francisco Bay Area
- Incorporated: February 18, 1850
- Named for: Mission Santa Clara de Asís, St. Clare of Assisi
- County seat and largest city: San Jose

Government
  - Type: Council–CEO
  - Board of Supervisors: Margaret Abe-Koga; Sylvia Arenas; Betty Duong; Susan Ellenberg; Otto Lee
  - Chief executive officer: James R. Williams

Area
  - Total: 1,304 sq mi (3,380 km^{2})
  - Land: 1,290 sq mi (3,300 km^{2})
  - Water: 14 sq mi (36 km^{2})
- Highest elevation: 4,216 ft (1,285 m)

Population (2020)
  - Total: 1,936,259
  - Estimate (2025): 1,914,391 ▼
  - Rank: 6th in California
  - Density: 1,500/sq mi (580/km^{2})
  - MSA: 2,000,468 (US: 35th)

GDP
  - Total: $438.483 billion (2024)
- Time zone: UTC−8 (Pacific)
  - Summer (DST): UTC−7 (Pacific Daylight Time)
- Area codes: 408/669, 650
- FIPS code: 06-085
- GNIS feature ID: 277307
- Congressional districts: 16th, 17th, 18th, 19th
- Website: santaclaracounty.gov

Santa Clara County (commonly referred to as the South Bay) is a county in the U.S. state of California. It is a subregion of the San Francisco Bay Area. The county is the most populous in Northern California and the sixth-most populous in California, with 1,936,000 residents as of the 2020 census. The county seat and the largest city in the county is the city of San Jose.

The United States Census Bureau groups Santa Clara County and neighboring San Benito County into the San Jose–Sunnyvale–Santa Clara metropolitan statistical area, which has a combined population of about 2 million. This MSA is included in the broader San Jose–San Francisco–Oakland combined statistical area.

Containing significant portions of Silicon Valley, the South Bay is an economic center for high technology, and had the third-highest gross domestic product (GDP) per capita in the world as of 2015 behind Zürich and Oslo, according to the Brookings Institution. Located on the southern coast of San Francisco Bay, the urbanized southern portion of Santa Clara Valley between the Santa Cruz Mountains and Diablo Range contains most of the county's population.

As of 2020, Santa Clara County had a median household income of $130,890, the third-highest household income of any county in the nation behind Loudoun County, Virginia and Falls Church, Virginia, and the highest of any county in the Western United States.

== Etymology ==
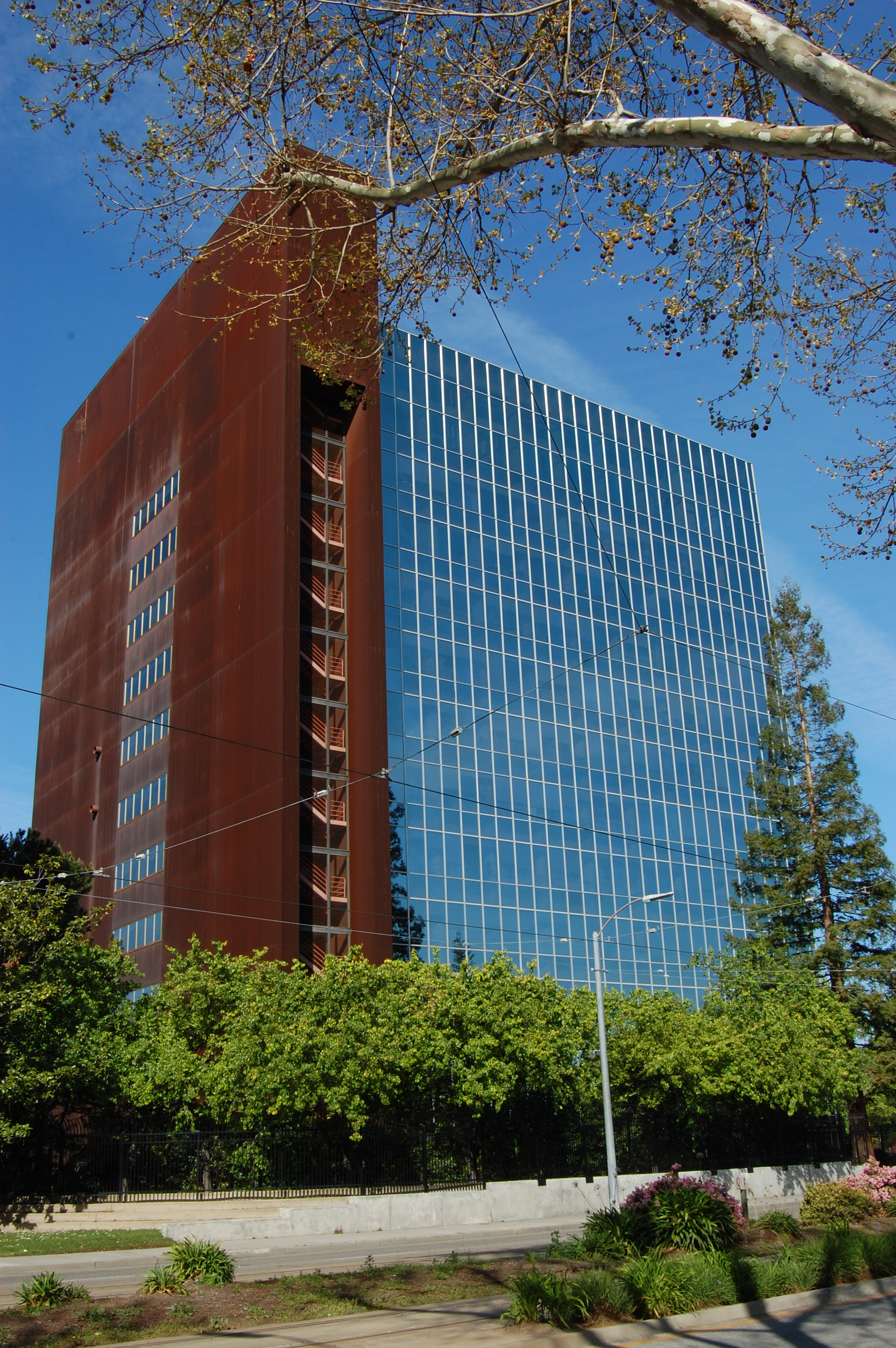
Santa Clara County Government Center in central San Jose

Santa Clara County is named for Mission Santa Clara, which was established in 1777, and was in turn named for Saint Clare of Assisi.

== History ==
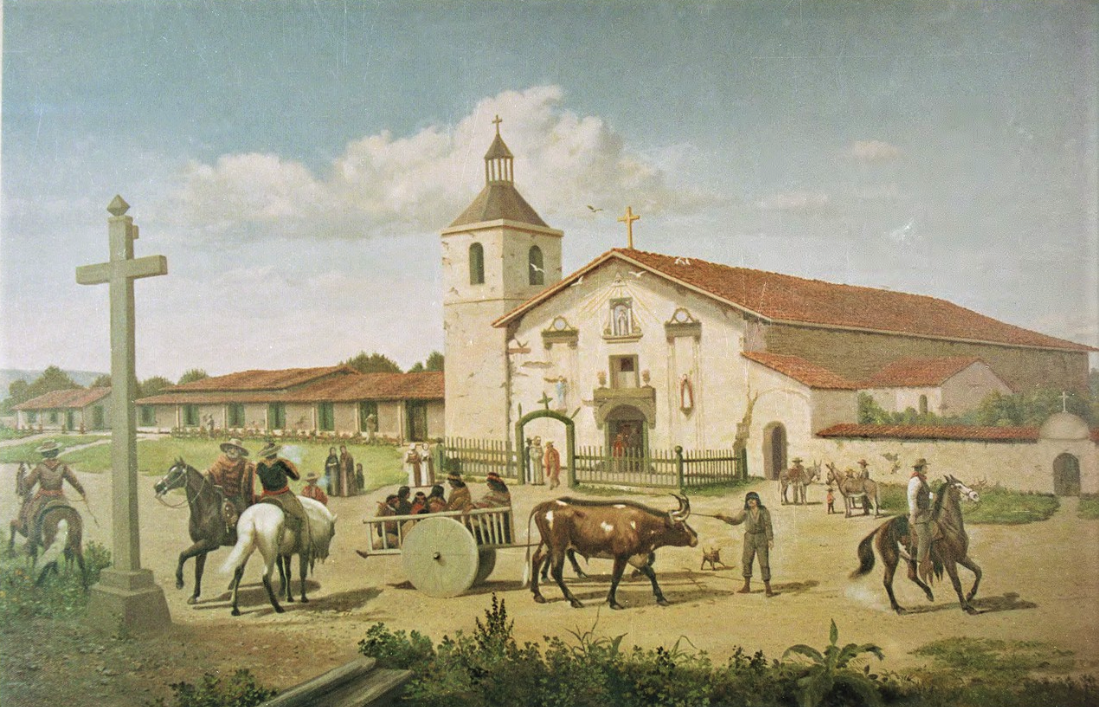
Mission Santa Clara de Asís in 1849

Santa Clara County was one of the original counties of California, formed in 1850 at the time of statehood. The original inhabitants included the Ohlone, residing on Coyote Creek and Calaveras Creek. Part of the county's territory was given to Alameda County in 1853.

In 1882, Santa Clara County tried to levy taxes upon property of the Southern Pacific Railroad within county boundaries. The result was the U.S. Supreme Court case of Santa Clara County v. Southern Pacific Railroad, 118 U.S. 394 (1886), in which the court extended due-process rights to artificial legal entities.

In the early 20th century, the area was promoted as the "Valley of the Heart's Delight" due to its natural beauty, including a significant number of orchards. The region was also memorably referred to as the "sun-kissed Santa Clara Valley" in Jack London's 1903 Call of the Wild.

The first major technology company to be based in the area was Hewlett-Packard, founded in a garage in Palo Alto in 1939. IBM selected San Jose as its West Coast headquarters in 1943. Varian Associates, Fairchild Semiconductor, and other early innovators were in the county by the late 1940s and 1950s. The U.S. Navy had a large presence in the area and began giving large contracts to Silicon Valley electronics companies. The term "Silicon Valley" was coined in 1971. The trend accelerated in the 1980s and 1990s, and agriculture has since been nearly eliminated from the northern part of the county.

Santa Clara County is the headquarters for about 6500 high-technology companies, including many of the world's largest such companies, including AMD, Nvidia, Cisco Systems, and Intel, computer and consumer electronics companies Apple Inc. and Hewitt Packard, and internet companies eBay, Google, and Yahoo!. Most of what is considered to be Silicon Valley is within the county, although some adjoining tech regions in San Mateo (e.g., Meta), Alameda, and Santa Cruz counties are also considered part of Silicon Valley.

== Geography ==
According to the U.S. Census Bureau, the county has a total area of 1,291.08 square miles (3,343.9 km^{2}).

Counties which border with Santa Clara County are, clockwise, Alameda County, San Joaquin (within a few hundred feet at Mount Boardman), Stanislaus, Merced, San Benito, Santa Cruz, and San Mateo County. Santa Clara County formerly shared borders with Contra Costa, San Francisco, Mariposa, Monterey, and Tuolumne counties until 1853, 1856, 1874, and 1854 respectively (Monterey County currently comes within a few miles of Santa Clara).

The San Andreas Fault runs along the Santa Cruz Mountains in the south and west of the county.

=== National protected area ===
- Don Edwards San Francisco Bay National Wildlife Refuge (part)

=== Fauna ===
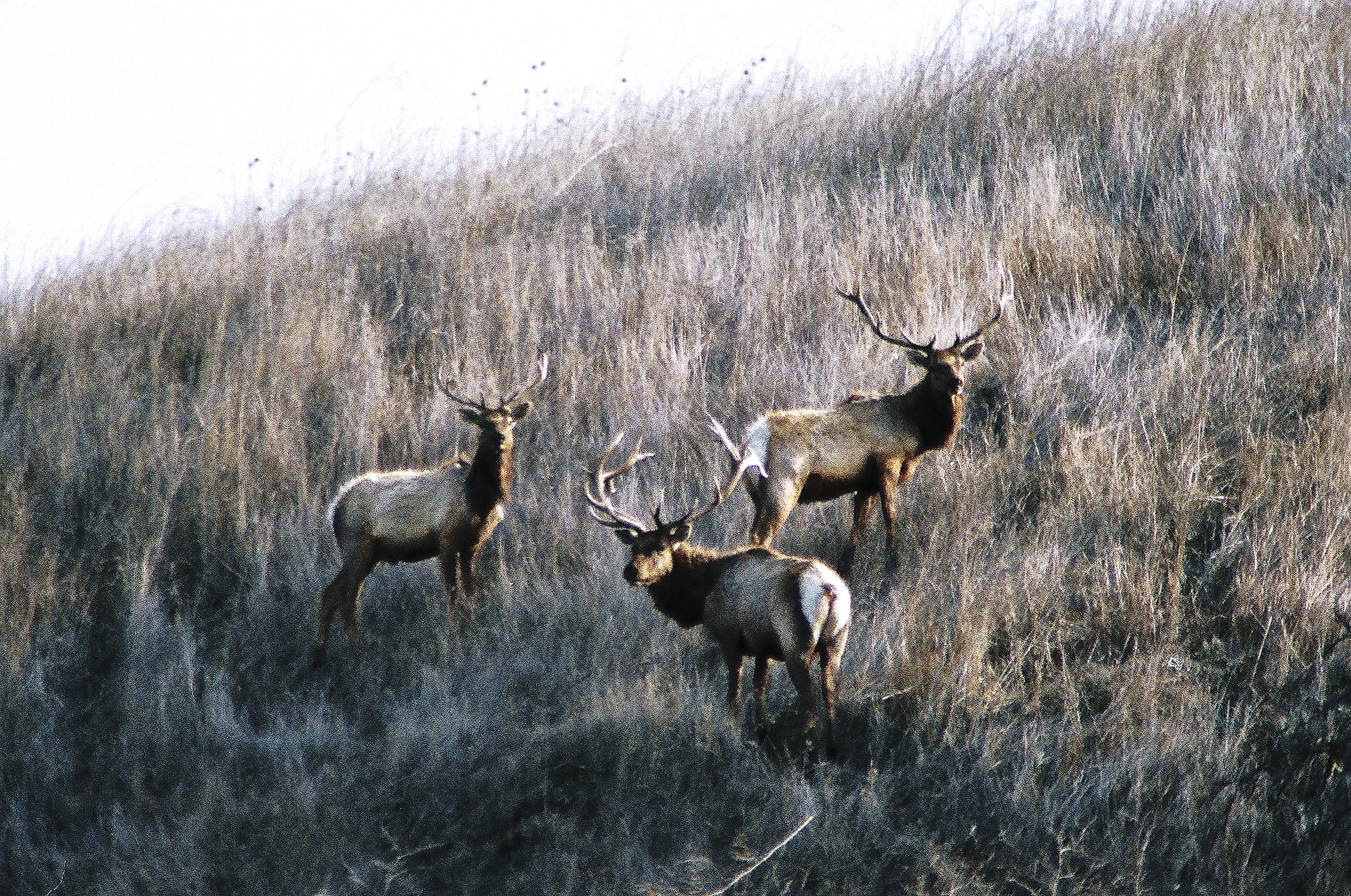
Three tule elk just north of U. S. Highway 101 in Basking Ridge Park. The freeway is a barrier to elk migration to the Coast Range.

Both tule elk (Cervus canadensis nannodes) and pronghorn (Antilocapra americana) were historically native to Santa Clara County. In June 1776, Lieutenant Commander Don José Joaquín Moraga led a group of soldiers and colonists from the Presidio of Monterey to establish Mission San Francisco de Asis and encountered both tule elk and pronghorn, and clearly distinguished these two species from deer. The deer in coastal California being black-tailed deer (Odocoileus hemionus columbianus).

Regarding elk, Moraga wrote: "In the great plain called San Bernardino (the Santa Clara Valley which stretches from south San Jose to Gilroy), while the expedition was strung out at length, we descried in the distance a herd of large animals that looked like cattle, but we could not imagine where they belonged or from whence they had come...with horns similar in shape to those of the deer, but so large that they measured sixteen palms from tip to tip." Upon measurement, Morago reported the elk horns as four varas [11 feet (3.4 m)] across... "These animals [elk] are called ciervos in order to differentiate them from the ordinary Spanish variety of deer, here called venados, which also exist in abundance and of large size in the vicinity."

Regarding pronghorn, Moraga reported: "In the said plains of San Bernardino (Santa Clara Valley)…there is another species of deer about the size of three-year-old sheep. They are similar in appearance to the deer, except they have short horns and also short legs like the sheep. They live in the plains where they go in herds of 100, 200, or more. They run all together over the plains so fast that they seem to fly…These animals are called berrendos and there are many of them also in the southern Missions wherever the country is level."

Herbert Eugene Bolton also wrote of elk reports from another Spanish expedition, from the De Anza Expedition on March 23, 1776: " In Gilroy Valley (Santa Clara Valley) Moraga 's larder was replenished by three elks which the men killed without leaving the road." General John Bidwell, of the 1841 Bartleson-Bidwell Party wrote: "In some of the fertile valleys, such as Napa and Santa Clara, there were elk literally by the thousand."

In 1978, California Department of Fish and Game warden Henry Coletto urged the department to choose the Mount Hamilton area as one of California's relocation sites under a new statewide effort to restore tule elk. While other ranchers refused, tech pioneers Bill Hewlett and David Packard allowed Coletto and state biologists to translocate the initial 32 tule elk from the Owens Valley in the eastern Sierra onto the 28,000-acre (11,000 ha) San Felipe Ranch, which the families jointly own, in the hills east of Morgan Hill. From the three original 1978–1981 translocations (totaling 65 animals) to the Mount Hamilton region of the Diablo Range, there are multiple herds in different locations including the Isabel Valley, San Antonio Valley, Livermore area, San Felipe Ranch, Metcalf Canyon, Coyote Ridge, Anderson Lake, and surrounding areas such as the Sunol and Cottonwood Creek (near San Luis Reservoir in western Merced County, California) herds. As of 2012, an estimated 400 tule elk roam 724 square miles (1,875 km^{2}) in northeastern Santa Clara County and southeastern Alameda County. In March 2014 CDFW translocated nine bull elk from the San Luis National Wildlife Refuge to add genetic diversity to the San Antonio Valley Ecological Reserve herd in San Antonio Valley in extreme eastern Santa Clara County. As of 2017 there were four herds in the Coyote Ridge area, often visible from U. S. Highway 101, according to Craige Edgerton, recently retired executive director of the Silicon Valley Land Conservancy and local naturalist Michael Hundt. In 2019, a fifth herd of tule elk was documented by local naturalist Roger Castillo, likely having split from the Coyote Ridge herd and established itself in Silver Creek Valley around the closed Ranch Golf Club. The elk herds in eastern Santa Clara County are blocked from dispersal to the west by U.S. Highway 101, with environmentalists advocating re-purposing the Metcalf Road bridge at the Coyote Gap into a wildlife overcrossing. This would enable elk to recolonize rural southwestern Santa Clara County, as well as Santa Cruz and San Mateo Counties.

In 1990, the California Department of Fish and Game's Henry Coletto translocated excess pronghorn from Modoc County to six locations in California, including 51 animals to the San Felipe Ranch in Santa Clara County, where the swift-footed ungulates had not lived for generations. The animals left the San Felipe Ranch for the Isabel and San Antonio Valleys, as well as an area near Lake Del Valle in Alameda County may now be extirpated by poaching, highway vehicle collisions, and insufficient numbers to defend pronghorn fawns against coyote predation. As of 2012, the Isabel Valley Ranch herd had dwindled to 3 animals, and the Lake del Valle herd to 13. Currently, iNaturalist.org has zero observer records of pronghorn in Santa Clara County.

The Nature Conservancy "Mount Hamilton Project" has acquired or put under conservation easement 100,000 acres (40,000 ha) of land towards its 500,000 acres (200,000 ha) goal for habitat conservation within a 1,200,000 acres (490,000 ha) area encompassing much of eastern Santa Clara County as well as portions of southern Alameda County, western Merced and Stanislaus Counties, and northern San Benito County. Acquisitions to date include the 1,756-acre (711 ha) Rancho Cañada de Pala, straddling the Alameda Creek and Coyote Creek watersheds for California tiger salamander habitat; a conservation easement on the 3,259-acre (5.092 sq mi) Blue Oak Ranch Reserve, which abuts the north side of Joseph D. Grant County Park; a conservation easement on the 28,359-acre (44.311 sq mi) San Felipe Ranch, connecting Joseph D. Grant County Park with Henry W. Coe State Park; the 2,899-acre (4.530 sq mi) South Valley Ranch which protects a tule elk herd in the San Antonio Valley, and other properties.

As of 1980, Santa Clara County had the highest number of Superfund Sites of any county in the United States, accounting for 25 polluted locations requiring a long-term response to clean up hazardous material contaminations. As of 2019, Santa Clara County has 23 active Superfund Sites, still more than any other county in the United States. The vast majority of these Superfund sites were caused by firms associated with the high tech sector in Silicon Valley.

== Climate ==
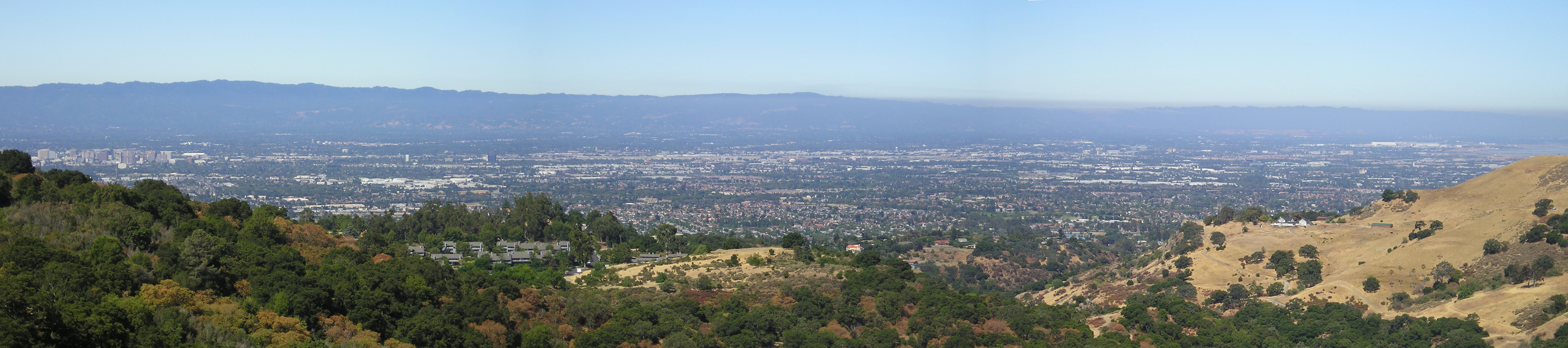
Looking west over northern San Jose (downtown is at far left) and other parts of the South Bay

The climate of the South Bay is a Mediterranean climate with warm, very dry summers and mild, fairly rainy winters. Today, the Valley attracts many people from the East Coast with its warm and sunny climate. The South Bay receives on average 330 sunny days per year. The northern areas of the valley (such as Palo Alto or Mountain View) have greater marine influences with temperatures rarely rising above 85 °F (29 °C) while in the southern areas and near the mountains (such as Los Gatos, Morgan Hill, or Gilroy) the temperature frequently exceeds 95 °F (35 °C) in the summer months. Winter is the rainy season, but still quite sunny. Winter highs range from 57 to 66 °F (14 to 19 °C) while lows range from 40 to 48 °F (4 to 9 °C). Summer highs range from 82 to 95 °F (28 to 35 °C) and summer lows range from 53 to 58 °F (12 to 14 °C).

The record high for the South Bay was recorded in Los Gatos on June 9, 2000, with a temperature of 114 °F (46 °C) and the record low was recorded in Gilroy on December 23, 1990, with a temperature of 16 °F (−9 °C). Temperatures drop below 40 °F (4 °C) on average of 17 days per year, below freezing on average of 4 days per year and below 30 °F (−1 °C) on average of 0 days per year (none).

More recently, extensive droughts in California, further complicated by drainage of the local Anderson reservoir for seismic repairs, have strained the Valley's water security.

=== Temperatures ===
Climate data for San Jose, California
Month	Jan	Feb	Mar	Apr	May	Jun	Jul	Aug	Sep	Oct	Nov	Dec	Year
Record high °F (°C)	83 (28)	85 (29)	87 (31)	95 (35)	101 (38)	109 (43)	108 (42)	105 (41)	104 (40)	101 (38)	85 (29)	83 (28)	109 (43)
Mean daily maximum °F (°C)	62 (17)	65 (18)	70 (21)	73 (23)	77 (25)	82 (28)	84 (29)	84 (29)	81 (27)	76 (24)	65 (18)	62 (17)	72.9 (22.7)
Mean daily minimum °F (°C)	43 (6)	45 (7)	46 (8)	48 (9)	52 (11)	55 (13)	57 (14)	57 (14)	56 (13)	52 (11)	45 (7)	43 (6)	49.8 (9.9)
Record low °F (°C)	24 (−4)	26 (−3)	30 (−1)	35 (2)	37 (3)	42 (6)	47 (8)	47 (8)	42 (6)	36 (2)	21 (−6)	20 (−7)	20 (−7)
Average precipitation inches (mm)	3.2 (81)	2.8 (71)	2.6 (66)	1.0 (25)	0.4 (10)	0.1 (2.5)	0.1 (2.5)	0.1 (2.5)	0.2 (5.1)	0.9 (23)	1.2 (30)	2.0 (51)	15.1 (380)
Source: AccuWeather.com

.

Climate data for Campbell, California
Month	Jan	Feb	Mar	Apr	May	Jun	Jul	Aug	Sep	Oct	Nov	Dec	Year
Record high °F (°C)	83 (28)	86 (30)	89 (32)	93 (34)	98 (37)	110 (43)	108 (42)	106 (41)	106 (41)	100 (38)	86 (30)	83 (28)	110 (43)
Mean daily maximum °F (°C)	63 (17)	66 (19)	71 (22)	75 (24)	79 (26)	82 (28)	85 (29)	85 (29)	82 (28)	76 (24)	66 (19)	63 (17)	74 (23)
Mean daily minimum °F (°C)	43 (6)	46 (8)	47 (8)	49 (9)	52 (11)	56 (13)	57 (14)	57 (14)	55 (13)	51 (11)	46 (8)	43 (6)	50 (10)
Record low °F (°C)	22 (−6)	26 (−3)	29 (−2)	35 (2)	38 (3)	42 (6)	42 (6)	40 (4)	38 (3)	36 (2)	29 (−2)	19 (−7)	19 (−7)
Average precipitation inches (mm)	4.7 (120)	4.1 (100)	2.6 (66)	0.6 (15)	0.3 (7.6)	0.1 (2.5)	0.1 (2.5)	0.1 (2.5)	0.3 (7.6)	0.7 (18)	2.5 (64)	4.3 (110)	21.6 (550)

Climate data for Los Gatos, California
Month	Jan	Feb	Mar	Apr	May	Jun	Jul	Aug	Sep	Oct	Nov	Dec	Year
Record high °F (°C)	83 (28)	86 (30)	89 (32)	96 (36)	101 (38)	114 (46)	113 (45)	107 (42)	109 (43)	103 (39)	87 (31)	83 (28)	114 (46)
Mean daily maximum °F (°C)	63 (17)	66 (19)	72 (22)	76 (24)	80 (27)	84 (29)	86 (30)	86 (30)	84 (29)	77 (25)	66 (19)	63 (17)	75 (24)
Mean daily minimum °F (°C)	43 (6)	46 (8)	47 (8)	49 (9)	52 (11)	56 (13)	57 (14)	57 (14)	55 (13)	51 (11)	46 (8)	43 (6)	50 (10)
Record low °F (°C)	22 (−6)	25 (−4)	28 (−2)	35 (2)	37 (3)	41 (5)	41 (5)	40 (4)	38 (3)	36 (2)	28 (−2)	19 (−7)	19 (−7)
Average precipitation inches (mm)	4.9 (120)	4.1 (100)	2.8 (71)	0.6 (15)	0.3 (7.6)	0.1 (2.5)	0.1 (2.5)	0.1 (2.5)	0.3 (7.6)	0.7 (18)	2.8 (71)	4.8 (120)	22.8 (580)

Climate data for Sunnyvale, California
Month	Jan	Feb	Mar	Apr	May	Jun	Jul	Aug	Sep	Oct	Nov	Dec	Year
Record high °F (°C)	75 (24)	84 (29)	85 (29)	94 (34)	100 (38)	107 (42)	105 (41)	101 (38)	105 (41)	100 (38)	89 (32)	75 (24)	107 (42)
Mean daily maximum °F (°C)	61 (16)	62 (17)	64 (18)	69 (21)	73 (23)	77 (25)	79 (26)	79 (26)	78 (26)	73 (23)	64 (18)	61 (16)	70 (21)
Mean daily minimum °F (°C)	42 (6)	43 (6)	46 (8)	47 (8)	51 (11)	55 (13)	57 (14)	57 (14)	55 (13)	50 (10)	44 (7)	42 (6)	49 (10)
Record low °F (°C)	21 (−6)	24 (−4)	22 (−6)	31 (−1)	33 (1)	40 (4)	41 (5)	44 (7)	41 (5)	34 (1)	15 (−9)	20 (−7)	15 (−9)
Average precipitation inches (mm)	3.24 (82)	3.18 (81)	2.65 (67)	0.89 (23)	0.35 (8.9)	0.11 (2.8)	0.03 (0.76)	0.08 (2.0)	0.19 (4.8)	0.85 (22)	1.83 (46)	2.31 (59)	15.71 (399.26)
Source: National Weather Service

Climate data for Mountain View, California
Month	Jan	Feb	Mar	Apr	May	Jun	Jul	Aug	Sep	Oct	Nov	Dec	Year
Mean daily maximum °F (°C)	59 (15)	63 (17)	64 (18)	70 (21)	73 (23)	77 (25)	79 (26)	79 (26)	79 (26)	73 (23)	64 (18)	59 (15)	70 (21)
Mean daily minimum °F (°C)	41 (5)	43 (6)	46 (8)	46 (8)	52 (11)	52 (11)	52 (11)	52 (11)	52 (11)	48 (9)	45 (7)	41 (5)	48 (9)
Average precipitation inches (mm)	3.24 (82.3)	3.18 (80.8)	2.65 (67.3)	0.89 (22.6)	0.35 (8.9)	0.11 (2.8)	0.03 (0.8)	0.08 (2.0)	0.19 (4.8)	0.85 (21.6)	1.83 (46.5)	2.31 (58.7)	15.71 (399.1)
Source: www.weather.com/outlook/travel/businesstraveler/wxclimatology/monthly/graph/94043?from=text_bottomnav_business#climograph

== Demographics ==
Historical population
Census	Pop.	Note	%±
1850	4,812		—
1860	11,912		147.5%
1870	26,246		120.3%
1880	35,039		33.5%
1890	48,005		37.0%
1900	60,216		25.4%
1910	83,539		38.7%
1920	100,676		20.5%
1930	145,118		44.1%
1940	174,949		20.6%
1950	290,547		66.1%
1960	642,315		121.1%
1970	1,064,714		65.8%
1980	1,295,071		21.6%
1990	1,497,577		15.6%
2000	1,682,585		12.4%
2010	1,781,642		5.9%
2020	1,936,259		8.7%
2025 (est.)	1,914,391	▼	−1.1%
U.S. Decennial Census; 1790–1960 1900–1990; 1990–2000 2010 2020

=== American Community Survey 2025 data ===
The United States Census Bureau estimated that in 2025, Santa Clara County’s population was 1,914,391. It was also estimated that the county's population was 25.62% Non-Hispanic White, 24.88% Hispanic or Latino, 2.23% Non-Hispanic Black, 43.13% Asian, 0.18% Native American, 0.32% Pacific Islander, and 3.64% multiracial.

Total	Population	Percentage
Non-Hispanic White	490,392	25.62%
Hispanic or Latino	476,396	24.88%
Non-Hispanic Black	42,633	2.23%
Asian	825,748	43.13%
Native American	3,494	0.18%
Pacific Islander	6,056	0.32%
Non-Hispanic Multiracial	69,672	3.64%

=== 2020 census ===
As of the 2020 census, the county had a population of 1,936,259. The median age was 37.5 years. 21.0% of residents were under the age of 18 and 13.8% of residents were 65 years of age or older. For every 100 females there were 101.5 males, and for every 100 females age 18 and over there were 100.4 males age 18 and over.

There were 656,063 households in the county, of which 35.4% had children under the age of 18 living with them and 21.7% had a female householder with no spouse or partner present. About 20.2% of all households were made up of individuals and 7.5% had someone living alone who was 65 years of age or older.

There were 688,035 housing units, of which 4.6% were vacant. Among occupied housing units, 53.7% were owner-occupied and 46.3% were renter-occupied. The homeowner vacancy rate was 0.7% and the rental vacancy rate was 4.9%.

98.7% of residents lived in urban areas, while 1.3% lived in rural areas.

==== Racial and ethnic composition ====
As of the 2020 census, the racial makeup of the county was 32.2% White, 2.3% Black or African American, 1.1% American Indian and Alaska Native, 39.2% Asian, 0.4% Native Hawaiian and Pacific Islander, 14.0% from some other race, and 10.8% from two or more races. Hispanic or Latino residents of any race comprised 25.2% of the population.

The most reported ancestries in 2020 were Mexican (20%), Chinese (11.6%), Indian (10.6%), Vietnamese (8%), English (7.7%), and German (7.7%).

Santa Clara County, California – Racial and ethnic composition Note: the US Census treats Hispanic/Latino as an ethnic category. This table excludes Latinos from the racial categories and assigns them to a separate category. Hispanics/Latinos may be of any race.
Race / Ethnicity (NH = Non-Hispanic)	Pop 1980	Pop 1990	Pop 2000	Pop 2010	Pop 2020	% 1980	% 1990	% 2000	% 2010	% 2020
White alone (NH)	913,154	869,874	744,282	626,909	555,708	70.51%	58.09%	44.23%	35.19%	28.70%
Black or African American alone (NH)	42,237	52,583	44,475	42,331	42,148	3.26%	3.51%	2.64%	2.38%	2.18%
Native American or Alaska Native alone (NH)	8,506	6,694	5,270	4,042	3,240	0.66%	0.45%	0.31%	0.23%	0.17%
Asian alone (NH)	99,935	251,496	426,771	565,466	753,399	7.72%	16.79%	25.36%	31.74%	38.91%
Native Hawaiian or Pacific Islander alone (NH)	x	x	5,040	6,252	5,945	x	x	0.30%	0.35%	0.31%
Other race alone (NH)	4,628	2,366	3,522	3,877	10,195	0.36%	0.16%	0.21%	0.22%	0.53%
Mixed race or Multiracial (NH)	x	x	49,824	53,555	78,267	x	x	2.96%	3.01%	4.04%
Hispanic or Latino (any race)	226,611	314,564	403,401	479,210	487,357	17.50%	21.00%	23.98%	26.90%	25.17%
Total	1,295,071	1,497,577	1,682,585	1,781,642	1,936,259	100.00%	100.00%	100.00%	100.00%	100.00%

=== 2018 ===
Census demographics data released in 2019 show Asian Americans have had the plurality of Santa Clara's population since 2014.

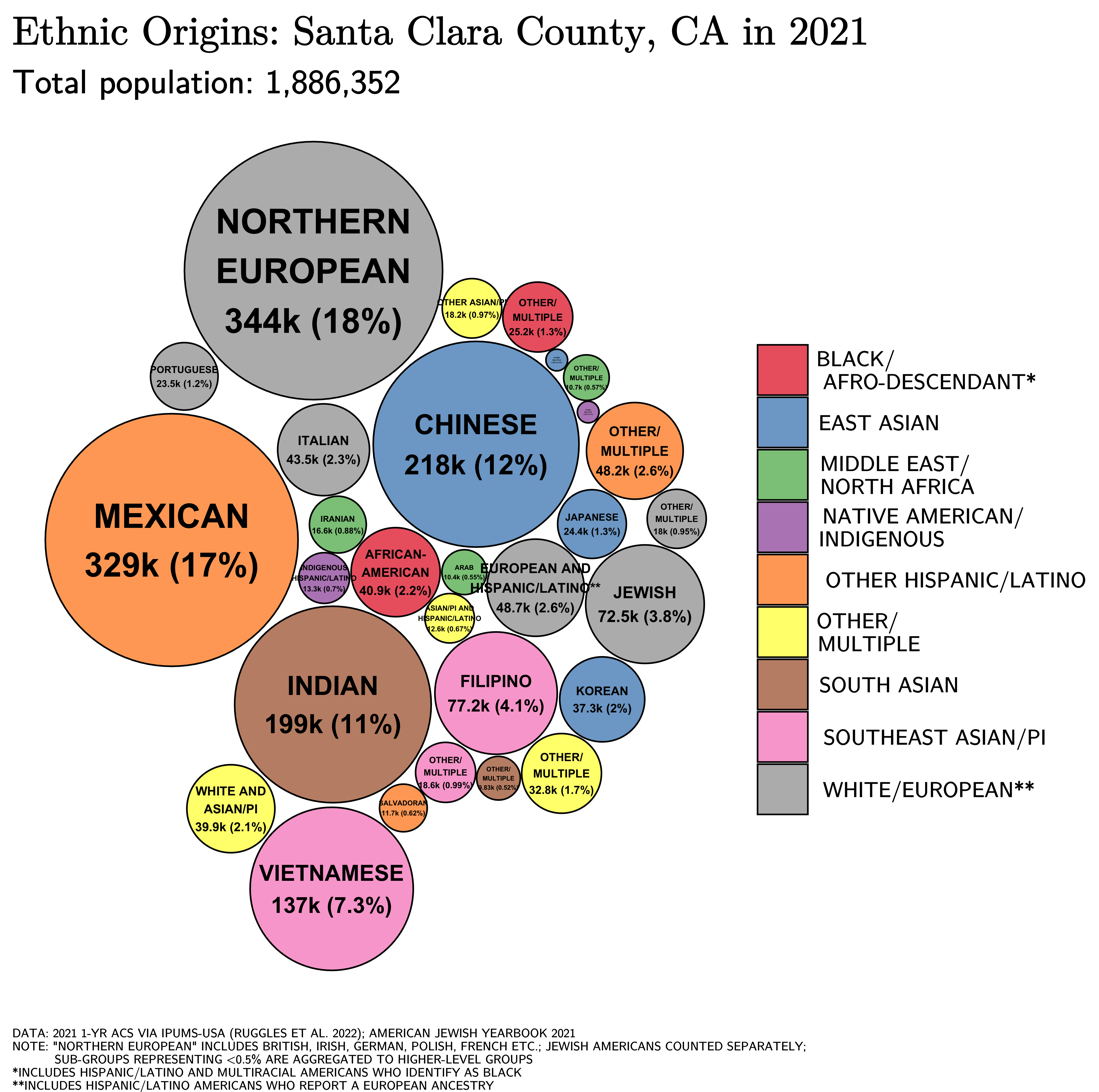
Ethnic origins in Santa Clara County

=== 2010 census ===
The 2010 United States census reported that Santa Clara County had a population of 1,781,642. The racial makeup of Santa Clara County was 836,616 (47.0%) White, 46,428 (2.6%) African American, 12,960 (0.7%) Native American, 7,060 (0.4%) Pacific Islander, 570,524 (32.0%) Asian, 220,806 (12.4%) from other races, and 87,248 (4.9%) from two or more races. Hispanics or Latinos of any race were 479,210 persons (26.9% of the population).

Demographic profile

The largest ancestry groups were:
- 22.5% Mexican
- 8.6% Chinese
- 8.2% German
- 7.1% Vietnamese
- 6.6% Indian
- 6.0% English
- 6.0% Irish
- 4.9% Filipino
- 4.6% Italian
- 2.0% French
- 1.6% Portuguese
- 1.6% Korean
- 1.4% American
- 1.4% Japanese
- 1.4% Scottish
- 1.2% Polish
- 1.2% Swedish
- 1.1% Russian
- 1.1% Norwegian
- 1.0% Dutch

Population reported at 2010 United States census
The County	Total; Population	White	African; American	Native; American	Asian	Pacific; Islander	other races	two or more races	Hispanic or Latino (of any race)
Santa Clara County	1,781,642	836,616	46,428	12,960	570,524	7,060	220,806	87,248	479,210
Incorporated cities and towns	Total; Population	White	African; American	Native; American	Asian	Pacific; Islander	other races	two or more races	Hispanic or Latino (of any race)
Campbell	39,349	26,315	1,158	275	6,320	161	2,713	2,407	7,247
Cupertino	58,302	18,270	344	117	36,895	54	670	1,952	2,113
Gilroy	48,821	28,674	942	831	3,448	111	12,322	2,493	28,214
Los Altos	28,976	20,459	148	48	6,815	59	195	1,252	1,132
Los Altos Hills	7,922	5,417	37	4	2,109	8	50	297	213
Los Gatos	29,413	24,060	269	86	3,203	52	462	1,281	2,120
Milpitas	66,790	13,725	1,969	309	41,536	346	5,811	3,094	11,240
Monte Sereno	3,341	2,698	14	12	464	0	28	125	162
Morgan Hill	37,882	24,713	746	335	3,852	125	5,779	2,332	12,863
Mountain View	74,066	41,468	1,629	344	19,232	391	7,241	3,761	16,071
Palo Alto	64,403	41,359	1,197	121	17,461	142	1,426	2,697	3,974
San Jose	945,942	404,437	30,242	8,297	303,138	4,017	148,749	47,062	313,636
Santa Clara	116,468	52,359	3,154	579	43,889	651	9,624	6,212	22,589
Saratoga	29,926	16,125	94	41	12,376	23	202	1,065	1,034
Sunnyvale	140,081	60,193	2,735	662	57,320	638	12,177	6,356	26,517
Census-designated places	Total; Population	White	African; American	Native; American	Asian	Pacific; Islander	other races	two or more races	Hispanic or Latino (of any race)
Alum Rock	15,536	6,581	207	298	2,039	70	5,466	875	10,977
Burbank	4,926	2,994	135	64	379	16	1,049	289	2,509
Cambrian Park	3,282	2,598	26	29	221	19	190	199	591
East Foothills	8,269	4,853	205	78	1,445	41	1,219	428	3,118
Fruitdale	935	633	31	11	110	4	88	58	244
Lexington Hills	2,421	2,148	10	5	90	0	59	109	193
Loyola	3,261	2,291	19	1	760	2	37	151	114
San Martin	7,027	4,329	27	71	470	18	1,752	360	3,249
Stanford	13,809	7,932	651	86	3,777	28	263	1,072	1,439
Other unincorporated areas	Total; Population	White	African; American	Native; American	Asian	Pacific; Islander	other races	two or more races	Hispanic or Latino (of any race)
All others not CDPs (combined)	30,494	21,985	439	256	3,175	84	3,234	1,321	7,651

=== 2000 ===
As of the census of 2000, 1,682,585 people, 565,863 households, and 395,538 families were residing in the county. The population density was 503/km^{2} (1,300/mi^{2}). The 579,329 housing units had an average density of 173/km^{2} (450/mi^{2}). The ethnic makeup of the county was 53.8% White, 2.8% African American, 0.7% Native American, 25.6% Asian, 0.3% Pacific Islander, 12.1% from other races, and 4.7% from two or more races. About 24.0% of the population were Hispanic or Latino of any race.

Of the 565,863 households, 34.9% had children under 18 living with them, 54.9% were married couples living together, 10.0% had a female householder with no husband present, and 30.1% were not families. About 21.4% of all households were made up of individuals, and 5.9% had someone living alone who was 65 or older. The average household size was 2.92, and the average family size was 3.41.

In the county, the age distribution was 24.7% under 18, 9.3% from 18 to 24, 35.4% from 25 to 44, 21.0% from 45 to 64, and 9.5% who were 65 or older. The median age was 34 years. For every 100 females, there were 102.80 males. For every 100 females 18 and over, there were 101.90 males.

The median income for a household in the county was $74,335, and for a family was $81,717. Males had a median income of $56,240 versus $40,574 for females. The per capita income for the county was $32,795. About 4.9% of families and 7.5% of the population were below the poverty line, including 8.4% of those under age 18 and 6.4% of those age 65 or over.

=== 2020 religion census ===
Santa Clara County is among the most religiously diverse counties in the US. A 2020 census by the Public Religion Research Institute (unconnected to the official US census) calculates a religious diversity score of 0.876 for Santa Clara County, where 1 represents complete diversity (each religious group of equal size) and 0 a total lack of diversity. Only four counties in the US have higher diversity scores than Santa Clara County.

== Government ==
Santa Clara County has five elected supervisors, elected within their districts. The board appoints the County Executive, who is James R. Williams, J.D. The County Executive is responsible for the administration of the county and appoints almost all other officers and department heads.

The county is one among three counties in California (with Napa and Madera) to establish a separate department, the Santa Clara County Department of Corrections, to deal with corrections pursuant to California Government Code §23013.

The county operates the Santa Clara County Health System of medical centers and clinics.

In the United States House of Representatives, Santa Clara County is split among four congressional districts:

- California's 16th congressional district, represented by Democrat Sam Liccardo,
- California's 17th congressional district, represented by Democrat Ro Khanna,
- California's 18th congressional district, represented by Democrat Zoe Lofgren, and
- California's 19th congressional district, represented by Democrat Jimmy Panetta.

In the California State Senate, the county is split among four legislative districts:

- the 10th senatorial district, seat currently vacant,
- the 13th senatorial district, represented by Democrat Josh Becker,
- the 15th senatorial district, represented by Democrat Dave Cortese, and
- the 17th senatorial district, represented by Democrat John Laird.

In the California State Assembly, the county is split among six legislative districts:

- the 23rd Assembly district, represented by Democrat Marc Berman,
- the 24th Assembly district, represented by Democrat Alex Lee,
- the 25th Assembly district, represented by Democrat Ash Kalra,
- the 26th Assembly district, represented by Democrat Patrick Ahrens,
- the 28th Assembly district, represented by Democrat Gail Pellerin, and
- the 29th Assembly district, represented by Democrat Robert Rivas.

Voters in the county also elect a number of other officials to county-wide positions, including the Santa Clara County District Attorney, the Santa Clara County Sheriff, and a large number of criminal and civil judges that serve in courts throughout the county.

== Politics ==
Historically, Santa Clara County was a Republican stronghold in presidential elections. From 1872 through 1984, the only Democrats to carry Santa Clara County were Franklin D. Roosevelt, Lyndon B. Johnson, and Hubert Humphrey. However, 1988 would begin to mark a significant shift in the county's political leanings, starting with Michael Dukakis' narrow win and culminating in Bill Clinton's substantial 20-point victory in 1992. Since then, the Democratic presidential candidate has won Santa Clara County by large margins, and it also strongly supports Democratic candidates in congressional elections: all politicians representing the county at the state and federal level are members of the party. The last Republican to win a majority in the county was Ronald Reagan in 1984. While Republicans remained competitive at the state and local level throughout the 1990s, there are currently no elected Republicans representing the county above the local level.

United States presidential election results for Santa Clara County, California
Year	Republican		Democratic		Third party(ies)	
Year	No.	%	No.	%	No.	%
1880	3,113	51.50%	2,821	46.67%	111	1.84%
1884	3,840	52.91%	3,172	43.70%	246	3.39%
1888	4,457	49.94%	3,972	44.51%	495	5.55%
1892	4,620	44.48%	4,167	40.12%	1,600	15.40%
1896	6,315	53.51%	5,191	43.99%	295	2.50%
1900	7,107	58.25%	4,607	37.76%	486	3.98%
1904	8,274	66.10%	3,100	24.77%	1,143	9.13%
1908	7,950	58.88%	3,836	28.41%	1,716	12.71%
1912	173	0.75%	9,173	39.64%	13,793	59.61%
1916	16,592	50.77%	14,185	43.40%	1,904	5.83%
1920	19,565	68.09%	6,485	22.57%	2,682	9.33%
1924	20,056	58.02%	2,560	7.41%	11,952	34.58%
1928	31,710	63.81%	17,589	35.39%	395	0.79%
1932	27,353	47.54%	28,272	49.14%	1,906	3.31%
1936	26,498	40.41%	38,346	58.48%	732	1.12%
1940	40,100	49.20%	40,449	49.63%	947	1.16%
1944	39,409	47.04%	43,869	52.36%	499	0.60%
1948	52,982	53.25%	41,905	42.11%	4,615	4.64%
1952	91,940	59.74%	61,035	39.66%	932	0.61%
1956	105,657	59.09%	72,528	40.56%	633	0.35%
1960	131,735	52.67%	117,667	47.05%	690	0.28%
1964	117,420	36.63%	202,249	63.10%	858	0.27%
1968	163,446	45.61%	173,511	48.42%	21,410	5.97%
1972	237,334	51.90%	208,506	45.60%	11,453	2.50%
1976	219,188	49.46%	208,023	46.94%	15,927	3.59%
1980	229,048	48.02%	166,995	35.01%	80,960	16.97%
1984	288,638	54.81%	229,865	43.65%	8,136	1.54%
1988	254,442	46.99%	277,810	51.30%	9,276	1.71%
1992	170,870	28.38%	296,265	49.21%	134,920	22.41%
1996	168,291	32.16%	297,639	56.88%	57,361	10.96%
2000	188,750	34.44%	332,490	60.66%	26,889	4.91%
2004	209,094	34.63%	386,100	63.94%	8,622	1.43%
2008	190,039	28.55%	462,241	69.45%	13,309	2.00%
2012	174,843	27.19%	450,818	70.10%	17,430	2.71%
2016	144,826	20.58%	511,684	72.71%	47,199	6.71%
2020	214,612	25.23%	617,967	72.64%	18,162	2.13%
2024	210,924	28.10%	510,744	68.04%	28,938	3.86%

Gubernatorial elections results

Gubernatorial elections results
Year	Republican	Democratic
2022	30.0% 162,518	70.0% 379,377
2018	28.6% 175,791	71.4% 438,758
2014	27.1% 107,113	72.9% 288,732
2010	34.9% 178,695	61.3% 314,022
2006	52.2% 225,132	42.9% 185,037
2002	32.4% 116,862	55.3% 199,399
1998	31.7% 133,015	64.3% 270,105
1994	47.5% 212,075	47.5% 211,904
1990	42.6% 178,310	52.2% 218,843
1986	59.9% 227,285	37.6% 142,907
1982	44.0% 180,232	52.9% 216,781
1978	29.8% 110,444	61.4% 227,493
1974	46.7% 153,761	50.6% 166,760
1970	51.5% 172,562	46.1% 154,570
1966	55.4% 164,970	44.6% 132,793
1962	47.6% 112,700	51.2% 121,149

According to the California Secretary of State, as of October 2023, Santa Clara County has 1,021,457 registered voters. Of those, 525,176 (51.41%) are registered Democrats, and 167,840 (16.43%) are registered Republicans.

In November 2012, all of the cities, towns, and unincorporated areas of Santa Clara County had more registered Democrats than Republicans. In 2008, Barack Obama carried every city and town in the county, as well as the unincorporated areas.

Following the passage of Proposition 8, Santa Clara County joined San Francisco and Los Angeles in a lawsuit, becoming, along with San Francisco and Los Angeles, the first governmental entities in the world to sue for same-sex marriage.

=== Voter registration ===
Population and registered voters (2013)
Total population	1,762,754	
Registered voters (Note: Percentage of registered voters with respect to total population. Percentages of party members with respect to registered voters follow.)	817,310	46.4%
Democratic	372,979	45.6%
Republican	177,268	21.7%
Democratic–Republican spread	+195,711	+23.9%
American Independent	17,009	2.1%
Green	4,326	0.5%
Libertarian	4,843	0.6%
Peace and Freedom	1,950	0.2%
Americans Elect	36	0.0%
Other	1,542	0.2%
No party preference	237,357	29.0%

==== Cities by population and voter registration ====
Cities by population and voter registration
City	Population	Registered voters	Democratic	Republican	D–R spread	Other	No party preference
Campbell	39,108	53.4%	45.3%	23.8%	+21.5%	7.3%	26.2%
Cupertino	57,459	48.2%	37.0%	20.0%	+17.0%	4.0%	40.4%
Gilroy	47,808	42.7%	48.5%	25.2%	+23.3%	6.8%	22.1%
Los Altos	28,752	67.4%	41.5%	29.4%	+12.1%	4.3%	26.2%
Los Altos Hills	7,912	73.6%	34.9%	33.6%	+1.3%	4.3%	28.7%
Los Gatos	29,165	65.0%	41.0%	31.5%	+9.5%	6.2%	23.7%
Milpitas	66,038	40.4%	42.5%	19.2%	+23.3%	5.3%	35.0%
Monte Sereno	3,338	73.7%	37.1%	36.9%	+0.2%	6.1%	22.3%
Morgan Hill	37,278	52.6%	40.9%	32.0%	+8.9%	6.9%	23.0%
Mountain View	73,394	46.0%	49.1%	16.4%	+32.7%	5.3%	30.8%
Palo Alto	63,475	59.7%	52.6%	15.5%	+37.1%	3.8%	29.2%
San Jose	939,688	44.6%	46.8%	20.6%	+26.2%	6.0%	28.8%
Santa Clara	114,482	41.9%	46.5%	19.9%	+26.6%	6.1%	29.7%
Saratoga	29,781	66.8%	34.2%	31.5%	+2.7%	3.9%	31.8%
Sunnyvale	138,436	41.1%	45.0%	19.9%	+25.1%	5.0%	31.8%

== Crime ==
The following table includes the number of incidents reported in 2009 and the rate per 1,000 persons for each type of offense. Law Enforcement in Santa Clara County is handled by the Santa Clara County Sheriff's Office and local police departments.

Population and crime rates
Population	1,762,754	
Violent crime	5,013	2.84
Homicide	46	0.03
Forcible rape	387	0.22
Robbery	1,499	0.85
Aggravated assault	3,081	1.75
Property crime	23,790	13.50
Burglary	7,094	4.02
Larceny-theft (Note: Only larceny-theft cases involving property over $400 in value are reported as property crimes.)	28,303	16.06
Motor vehicle theft	7,356	4.17
Arson	403	0.23

=== Cities by population and crime rates ===
Cities by population and crime rates
City	Population	Violent crimes	Violent crime rate per 1,000 persons	Property crimes	Property crime rate per 1,000 persons
Campbell	42,697	89	2.08	1,357	31.78
Cupertino	60,357	55	0.91	1,018	16.87
Gilroy	60,106	251	4.18	1,479	24.61
Los Altos	30,716	21	0.68	310	10.09
Los Altos Hills	8,622	3	0.35	67	7.77
Los Gatos	30,793	14	0.45	419	13.61
Milpitas	82,344	102	1.24	2,193	26.63
Monte Sereno	3,507	0	0.00	12	3.42
Morgan Hill	46,118	52	1.13	703	15.24
Mountain View	84,599	165	1.95	2,463	29.11
Palo Alto	66,938	86	1.28	1,983	29.62
San Jose	1,040,008	4,559	4.38	25,164	24.20
Santa Clara	131,173	214	1.63	4,748	36.20
Saratoga	30,666	16	0.52	240	7.83
Sunnyvale	154,859	259	1.67	3,380	21.83

== Economy ==
The county's economy is heavily services-based. Technology, both hardware and software, dominates the service sector by value, but like any other county, Santa Clara has its share of retail and office support workers.

The San Jose/Sunnyvale/Santa Clara metropolitan region, comprising Santa Clara County and San Benito County, was ranked as the highest performing metropolitan area in the US in 2012, ahead of Austin, Texas and Raleigh, North Carolina, according to the Milken Institute. The GDP of the metro area reached $176.7 billion in 2011, or $94,587 per capita, roughly on par with Qatar in both total GDP and per capita (nominal). GDP grew 7.7% in 2011, and in contrast with most of California, GDP and per capita GDP (nominal) was well above levels during the 2008 financial crisis. Despite relative wealth vis a vis other regions nationally, a large underclass exists whose income is roughly equivalent to that elsewhere in the country, despite extreme land prices. The surge in metro GDP is highly correlated with home prices, which for average single-family homes passed $1 million ($1,017,528) in August 2013. As of the fourth quarter of 2021, the median value of homes in Santa Clara County was $1,253,400, an increase of 11.9% from the prior year, and ranking fourth in the US for highest median home value.

== Education ==
=== Colleges ===
- De Anza College, Cupertino
- Evergreen Valley College, San Jose
- Foothill College, Los Altos Hills
- Gavilan College, Gilroy
- Mission College, Santa Clara
- San Jose City College, San Jose
- West Valley College, Saratoga

=== Universities ===
- Palo Alto University, Palo Alto
- San Jose State University, San Jose
- Santa Clara University, Santa Clara
- Stanford University, Stanford

=== K-12 schools ===
School districts include:

Unified

- Gilroy Unified School District
- Milpitas Unified School District
- Morgan Hill Unified School District
- Palo Alto Unified School District
- Patterson Joint Unified School District
- San Jose Unified School District
- Santa Clara Unified School District

Secondary

- Campbell Union High School District
- East Side Union High School District
- Fremont Union High School District
- Los Gatos-Saratoga Joint Union High School District
- Mountain View–Los Altos Union High School District

Elementary

- Alum Rock Union Elementary School District
- Berryessa Union Elementary School District
- Cambrian Elementary School District
- Campbell Union Elementary School District
- Cupertino Union Elementary School District
- Evergreen Elementary School District
- Franklin-McKinley Elementary School District
- Lakeside Joint Elementary School District
- Loma Prieta Joint Union Elementary School District
- Los Altos Elementary School District
- Los Gatos Union Elementary School District
- Luther Burbank Elementary School District
- Moreland School District
- Mountain View Whisman Elementary School District
- Mount Pleasant Elementary School District
- Oak Grove Elementary School District
- Orchard Elementary School District
- Saratoga Union Elementary School District
- Sunnyvale Elementary School District
- Union School District

Defunct

- Montebello Elementary School District

=== Libraries ===
Santa Clara County Library is a public library system serving the communities and cities of Campbell, Cupertino, Gilroy, Los Altos, Los Altos Hills, Milpitas, Monte Sereno, Morgan Hill, Saratoga, and all unincorporated areas of the county. Other cities run their own library systems.

== Transportation ==
=== Air ===
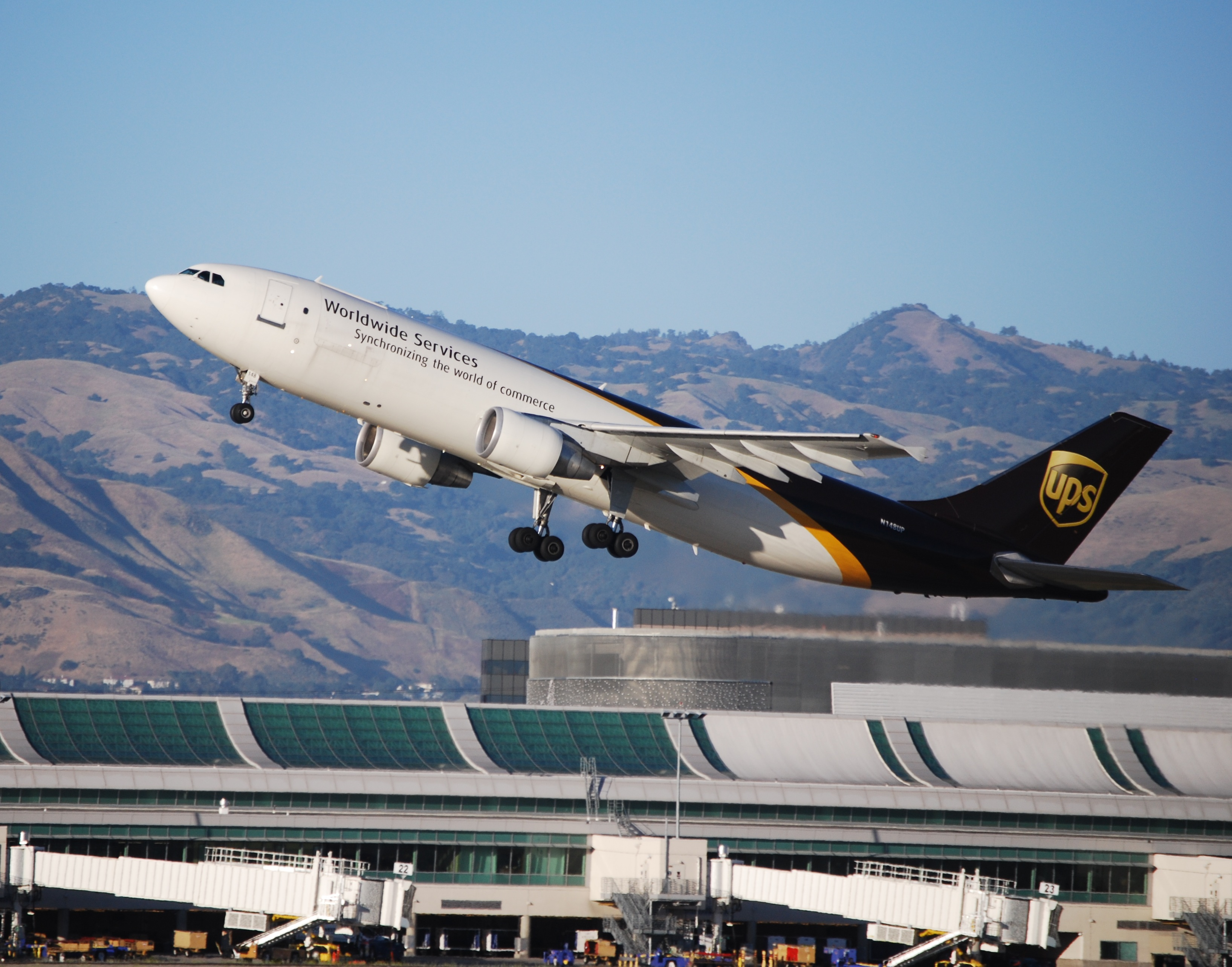
San Jose International Airport is ranked as the best-run airport in the United States by the ACBJ.

The county's main airport is Norman Y. Mineta San José International Airport (SJC). It is a U.S. Customs and Border Protection port of entry and as of 2019 has five international routes (two to Canada, one to England, one to Japan, seven to Mexico, and one to China) but the airport's busiest routes are all to cities in the western United States. San Francisco International Airport (SFO) is also often used for commercial services by residents of Santa Clara County.

Moffett Federal Airfield (NUQ), a former U.S. Naval Air Station, is used by the Air National Guard, NASA, Lockheed Martin, Google, and by the Santa Clara County Sheriff's Department as an air operations base. There are also smaller general aviation airports in Palo Alto (PAO), San Jose (Reid-Hillview) (RHV), and San Martin(E16)

=== Rail ===
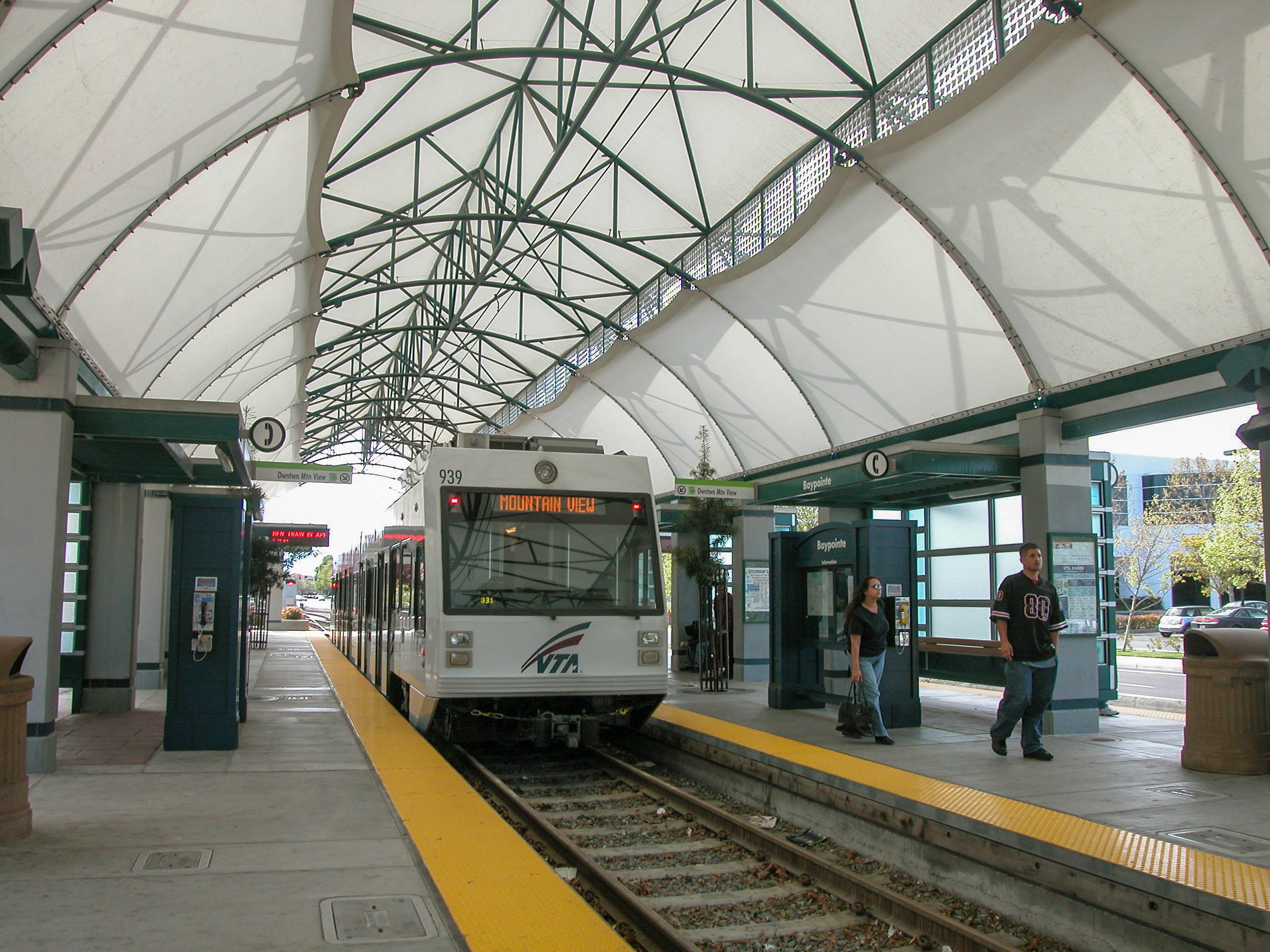
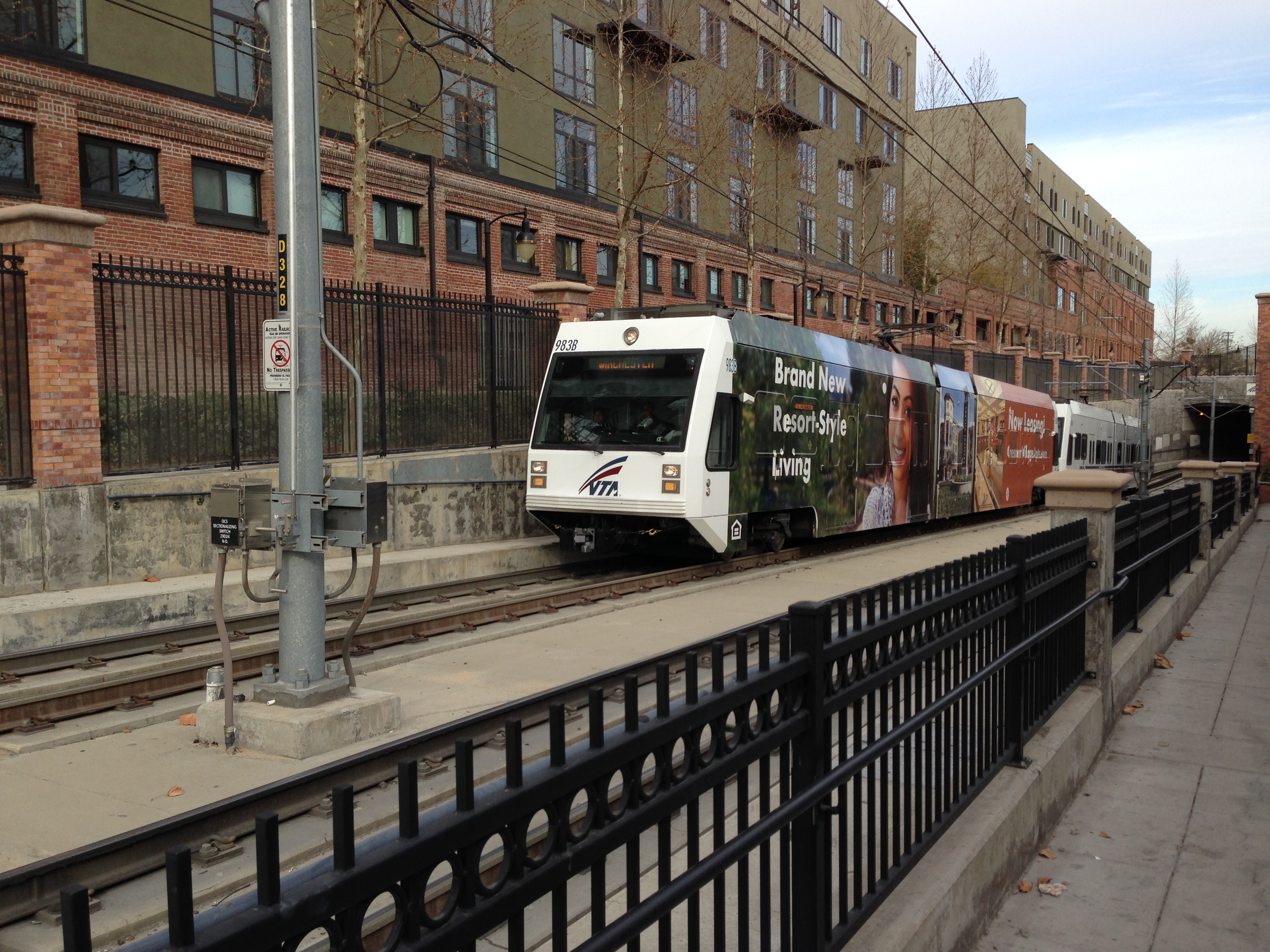
The VTA light rail system serves 11 million people annually in Silicon Valley.

Santa Clara County is served by Caltrain commuter rail from Gilroy through San Jose and Silicon Valley north to San Francisco Airport and San Francisco. The Santa Clara Valley Transportation Authority operates the VTA light rail system, which primarily serves San Jose, with one line continuing as far north as Mountain View. Santa Clara and San Jose are also served by the Altamont Corridor Express commuter rail line which provides services to Stockton, and Amtrak which provides service to Sacramento and Oakland. The Amtrak Coast Starlight train between Seattle and Los Angeles also stops in San Jose. BART currently services Milpitas and North San Jose, with plans to extend to downtown San Jose and Santa Clara.

=== Road ===
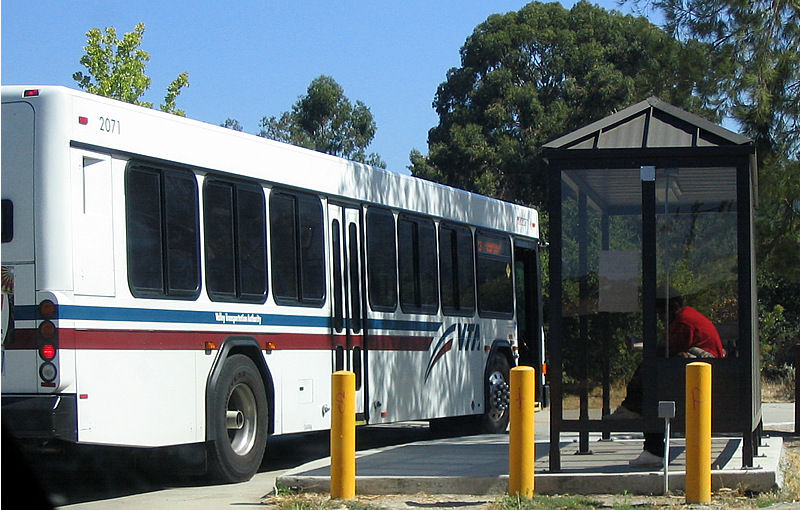
VTA bus arriving at Foothill College in Los Altos Hills

==== Buses ====
Santa Clara County has consolidated its transportation services into the Santa Clara Valley Transportation Authority, which operates a bus system.

==== Bicycle network ====
The Santa Clara Valley Transportation Authority is establishing a bicycle network throughout the county. Santa Clara County Bicycle network is part of the San Francisco Bay Area Regional Bikeway Network.

- Bikeways Map (Effective April 2011)
- Regional Bicycle Plan for the San Francisco Bay Area 2009 Update

==== Major highways ====
- I-280
- I-680
- I-880
- US 101
- SR 9
- SR 17
- SR 25
- SR 35
- SR 82
- SR 85
- SR 87
- SR 130
- SR 152
- SR 156
- SR 237

==== County expressways and roads ====
Santa Clara County maintains a separate expressway system. Unlike expressways virtually everywhere else in California, the Santa Clara County expressways were built, signed, and maintained as county roads instead of Caltrans or another state agency. There are still signed like other county routes in California and are patrolled by the California Highway Patrol.

- CR G2 (Lawrence Expressway)
- CR G3 (Page Mill Road/Oregon Expressway)
- CR G4 (San Tomas Expressway/Montague Expressway)
- CR G5 (Foothill Expressway)
- CR G6 (Central Expressway)
- CR G7 (Bloomfield Avenue)
- CR G8 (Almaden Expressway)
- CR G9 (Leavesley Road/Ferguson Road)
- CR G10 (Blossom Hill Road)
- CR G21 (Capitol Expressway)

There is also a large street network dominated by four- and six-lane arterials. Some of the newer boulevards (primarily in the West Valley) are divided with landscaped medians. —

=== Sea ===
The county has no commercial seaports, although small boats can access San Francisco Bay from several points. Like many other Bay Area counties, it is dependent upon the Port of Oakland for transport of ocean cargo.

== Jails ==
Santa Clara County Department of Correction is administered by the county's sheriff's office and supervises the following facilities:

- Santa Clara County Main Jail
  - Main Jail South (up to 674 men)
  - Main Jail North (up to 919 men)
- Elmwood Correctional Facility (up to 600 women, 2,500 men)
- North County Jail (day use only for Palo Alto courthouse)
- Juvenile Detention
  - Santa Clara County Juvenile Hall (up to 390 boys and girls)
  - William F. James Boys Ranch (up to 96 teenage boys)

== Parks ==
Santa Clara County has an extensive park system, much of it founded in the major park expansion of the late 1970s. Parks within the county include:

- Almaden Quicksilver County Park
- Grant Ranch Park
- Henry W. Coe State Park
- Sanborn Park
- Vasona Park

Open space preserves include:

- El Sereno Open Space Preserve

Santa Clara County also contains Ulistac Natural Area, a volunteer maintained natural open space. Foreign and invasive species are removed when possible as native plants are introduced. Migratory birds and butterflies often use this area.

== Sister counties ==
To promote friendship and understanding and to build bridges with countries of origin for various ethnic populations in the county, the County of Santa Clara has created a Sister County Commission to coordinate the program. As of 2023, there are two sister counties:

- Metropolitan City of Florence, Italy
- Hsinchu County, Taiwan (Republic of China)

A previously established relationship with Moscow was terminated in 2022.

== Communities ==
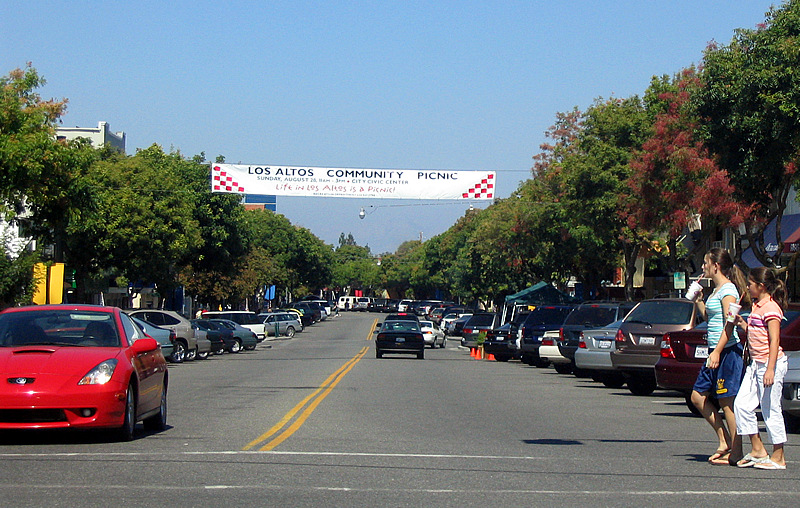
Los Altos is the 3rd most expensive zip code in the United States.

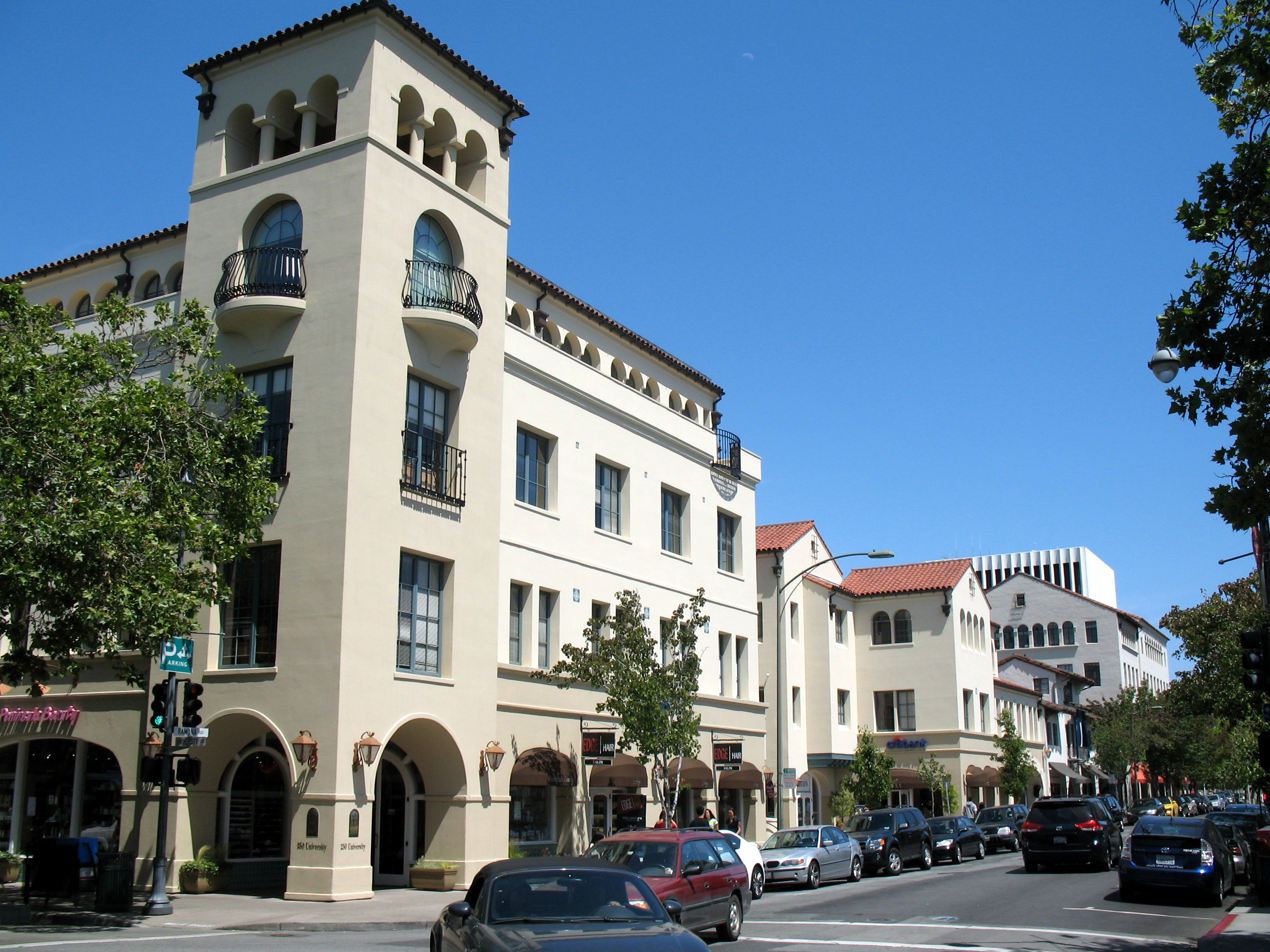
Palo Alto is the 5th most educated city and the 5th most expensive zip code in the United States.

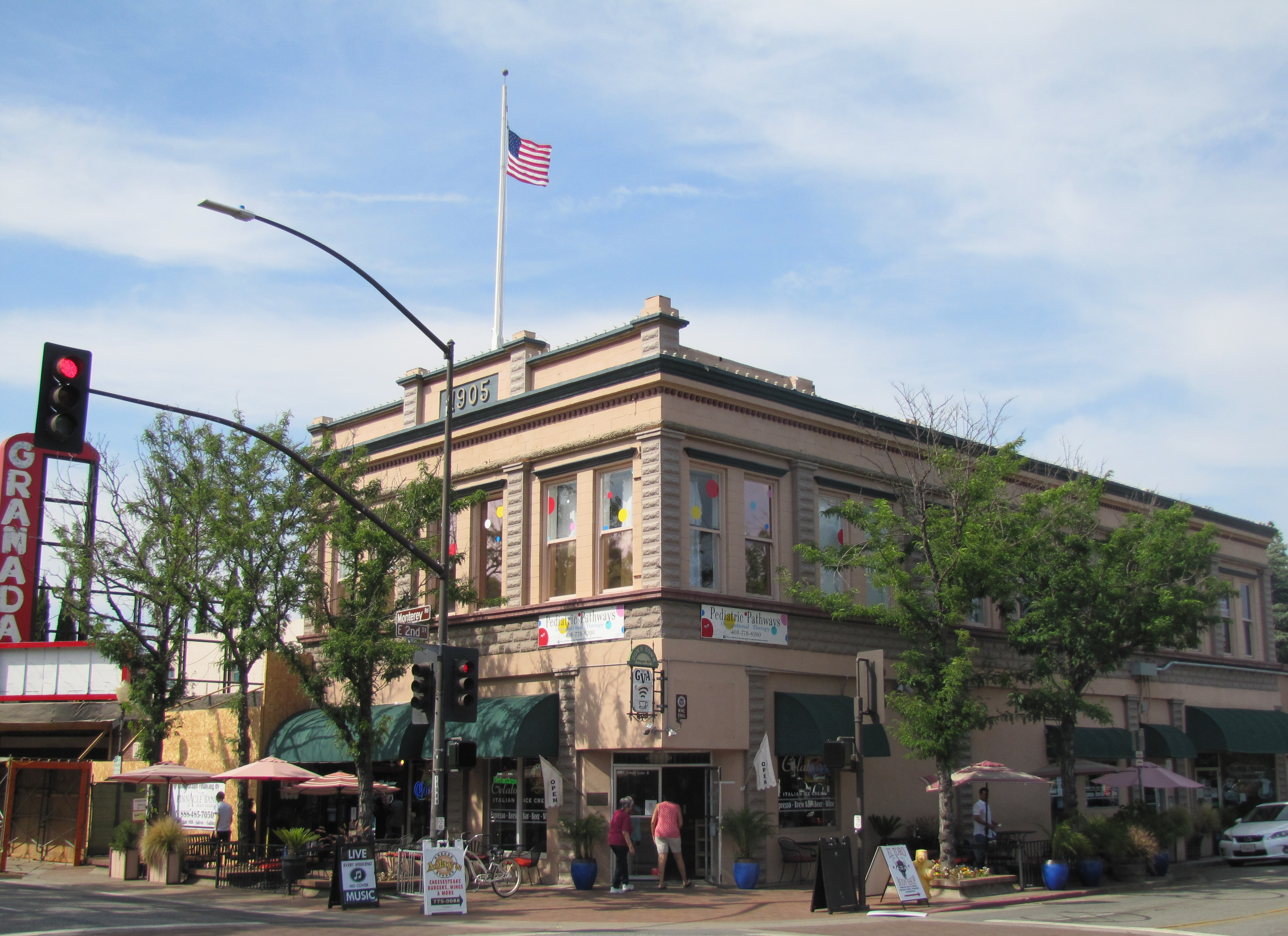
Morgan Hill is the 17th most expensive place to live in the United States.

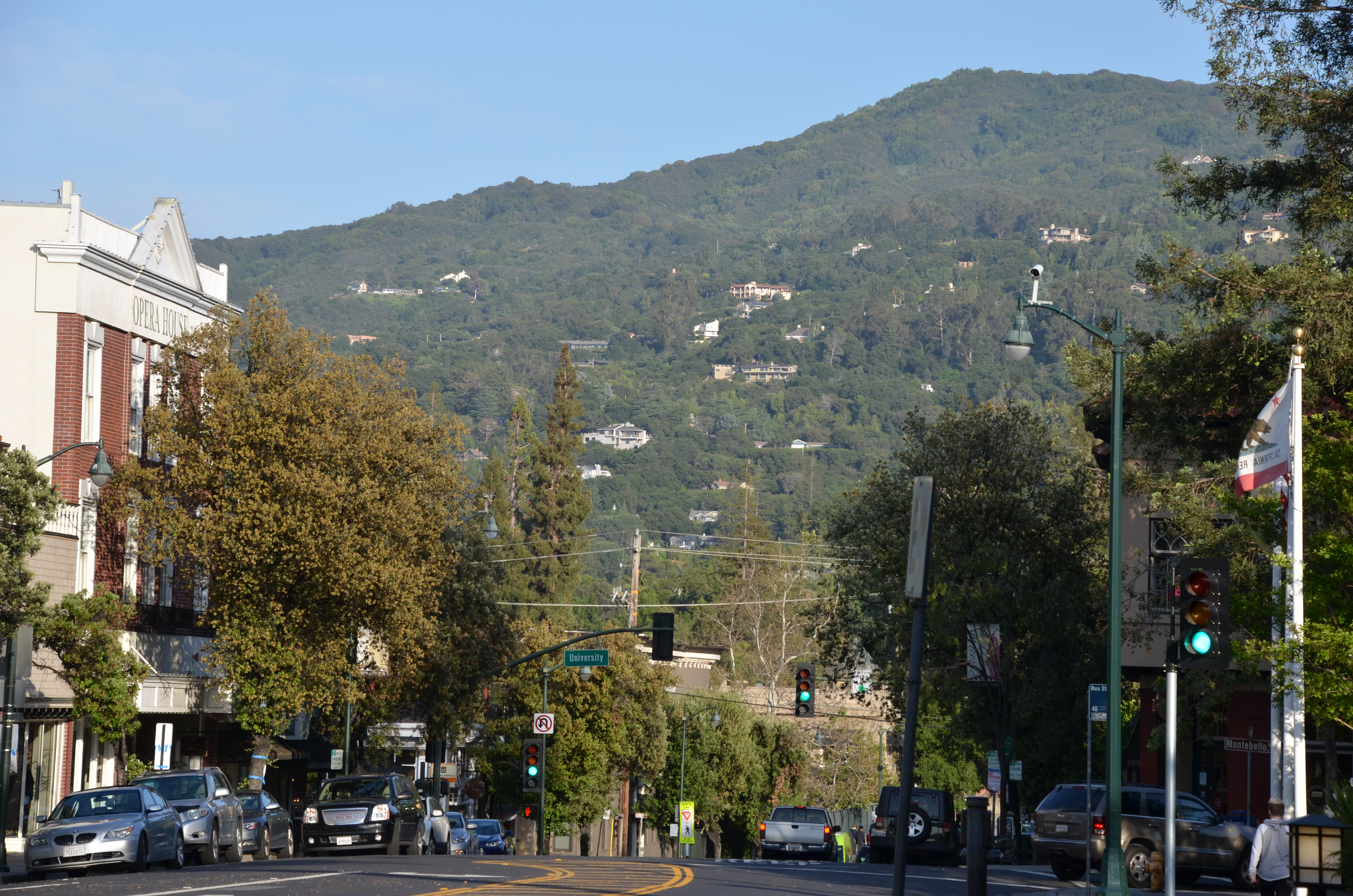
Los Gatos is the 33rd wealthiest city in the United States.

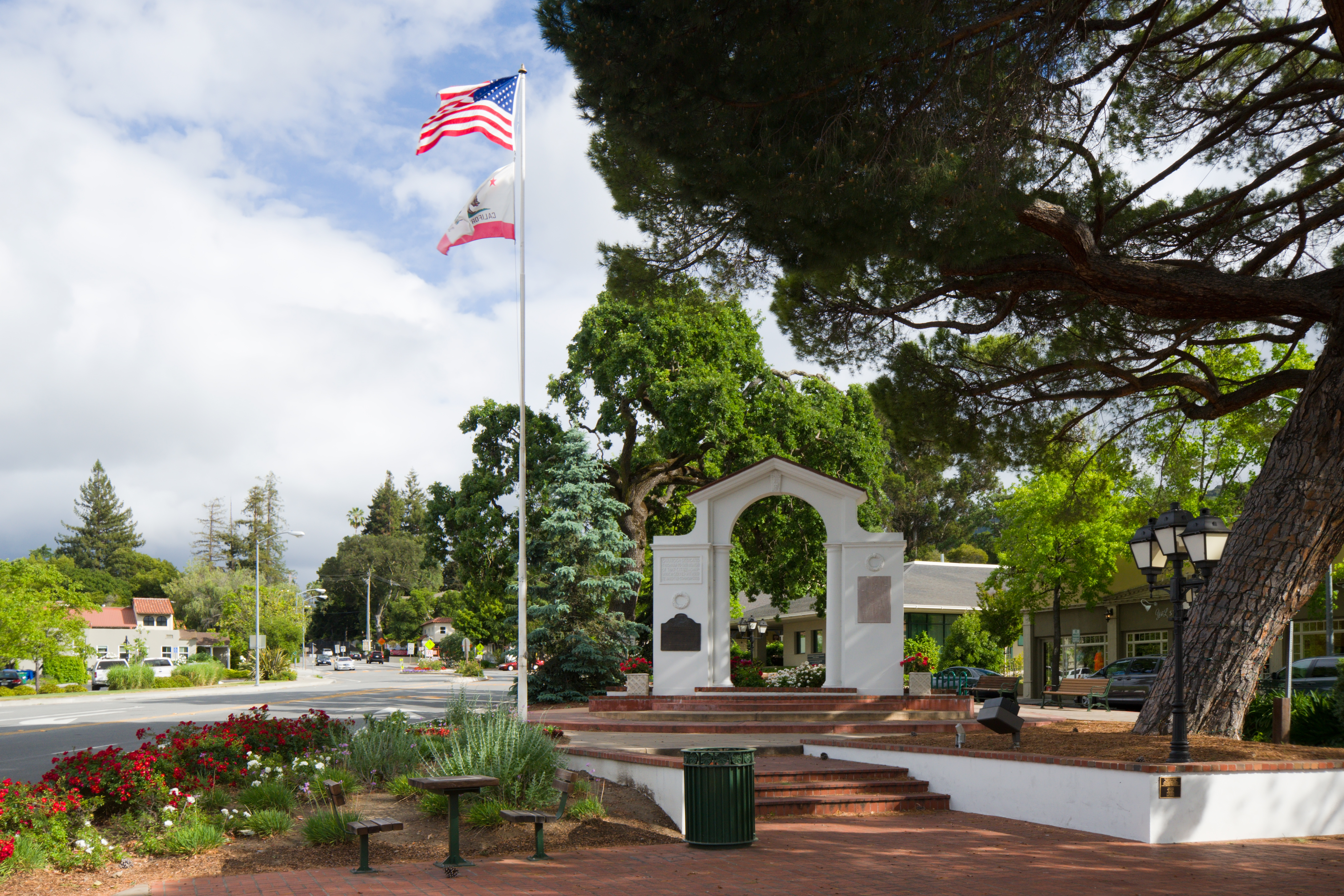
Saratoga is the 16th most educated and the 8th wealthiest city in the United States.

=== Cities ===
There are 15 incorporated places in Santa Clara County:

- Campbell
- Cupertino
- Gilroy
- Los Altos
- Milpitas
- Monte Sereno
- Morgan Hill
- Mountain View
- Palo Alto
- San Jose (county seat)
- Santa Clara
- Saratoga
- Sunnyvale

=== Towns ===
- Los Altos Hills
- Los Gatos

=== Census-designated places ===
- Alum Rock
- Burbank
- Cambrian Park
- East Foothills
- Fruitdale
- Lexington Hills
- Loyola also known as Loyola Corners
- San Martin
- Stanford

=== Unincorporated communities ===
- Bell Station, also known as Bell's Station and Hollenbeck's Station
- Casa Loma
- Chemeketa Park
- Coyote, also known as Burnett c. 1860–1882
- East San Jose
- Llagas-Uvas
- Madrone, now part of Morgan Hill
- Redwood Estates
- Rucker
- San Antonio, also known as Deforest c. 1892–1924
- Sveadal

=== Census county divisions ===
- Diablo Range
- Llagas–Uvas
- South Santa Clara Valley
- West Santa Clara

=== Former townships ===
- Almaden Township: Present-day Almaden Valley, Cambrian Park and portions of Campbell and Los Gatos.
- Alviso Township: Present-day Alviso.
- Burnett Township: Present-day Coyote, Santa Teresa and Morgan Hill.
- Fremont Township: Present-day Palo Alto, Sunnyvale, Mountain View, Los Altos, Los Altos Hills and part of Cupertino.
- Gilroy Township: Present-day Gilroy and San Martin.
- Milpitas Township: Present-day Milpitas.
- Redwood Township: Present-day Los Gatos, Monte Sereno, Saratoga, Redwood Estates and portions of Cupertino and Campbell.
- San Jose Township: Most of present-day San Jose.
- Santa Clara Township: Present-day Santa Clara and portions of San Jose, Cupertino and Campbell.

=== Population ranking ===
The population ranking of the following table is based on the 2020 census of Santa Clara County.

† county seat

Rank	City/Town/etc.	Municipal type	Population (2020 Census)
1	† San Jose	City	1,013,240
2	Sunnyvale	City	155,805
3	Santa Clara	City	127,647
4	Mountain View	City	82,376
5	Milpitas	City	80,273
6	Palo Alto	City	68,572
7	Cupertino	City	60,381
8	Gilroy	City	59,520
9	Morgan Hill	City	44,686
10	Campbell	City	43,959
11	Los Gatos	Town	33,529
12	Los Altos	City	31,625
13	Saratoga	City	31,051
14	Stanford	CDP	21,150
15	Alum Rock	CDP	12,042
16	Los Altos Hills	Town	8,489
17	San Martin	CDP	7,008
18	East Foothills	CDP	6,803
19	Burbank	CDP	4,940
20	Cambrian Park	CDP	3,719
21	Loyola	CDP	3,491
22	Monte Sereno	City	3,479
23	Lexington Hills	CDP	2,492
24	Fruitdale	CDP	989

== Notable structures ==
There are a number of well-known structures and sites of interest in the South Bay:

- Apple Park, Cupertino
- Hewlett-Packard, Palo Alto
- Stanford University, Palo Alto
- SAP Center, downtown San Jose
- Hayes Mansion, Southern San Jose
- Plaza de César Chávez, downtown San Jose
- Cathedral Basilica of Saint Joseph, downtown San Jose
- Winchester Mystery House, Western San Jose
- Santana Row, Western San Jose
- Lick Observatory, Mount Hamilton
- Rosicrucian Egyptian Museum, Central San Jose
- Mexican Heritage Plaza, Eastern San Jose
- History Park at Kelley Park, Central San Jose
- Children's Discovery Museum of San Jose, Downtown San Jose
- San Jose International Airport, uptown San Jose
- San Jose Museum of Art, downtown San Jose
- San Jose State University, downtown San Jose
- Santa Clara University, Santa Clara (which includes the original Santa Clara Mission site)
- California's Great America, Santa Clara
- The Tech Interactive, downtown San Jose
- Moffett Federal Airfield, Sunnyvale/Mountain View
- Yahoo!, Sunnyvale
- LinkedIn, Sunnyvale
- Alviso, Northern San Jose (sea access/ main port of goods from Asia in 1800 before Oakland took over the following century)
- Berryessa Flea Market, Northern San Jose (previously Earth's largest)
- Gurdwara Sahib of San Jose, Eastern San Jose (Sikh Temple built by President Jit Singh Bainiwal)
- Levis Stadium, Santa Clara

== See also ==
- List of attractions in Silicon Valley
- List of school districts in Santa Clara County, California
- National Register of Historic Places listings in Santa Clara County, California
- Santa Clara County expressway system
- Santa Clara County Health System
- Santa Clara Valley
- Santa Clara Valley AVA
- Second Harvest of Silicon Valley
