= Alum Rock (CDP), California =

Alum Rock
- Census designated place
- Interactive map of Alum Rock
- Location in the United States
- Coordinates: 37°22′3″N 121°49′32″W
- Country: United States
- State: California
- County: Santa Clara

Area
  - Total: 0.87 sq mi (2.25 km^{2})
  - Land: 0.87 sq mi (2.25 km^{2})
  - Water: 0 sq mi (0.00 km^{2})
- Elevation: 164 ft (50 m)

Population (2020)
  - Total: 12,042
  - Density: 13,858.4/sq mi (5,350.74/km^{2})
- Time zone: UTC-8 (Pacific)
  - Summer (DST): UTC-7 (PDT)
- ZIP code: 95127
- Area codes: 408/669
- FIPS code: 06-01458
- GNIS feature ID: 2407736

Alum Rock is a census-designated place in Santa Clara County, California, United States.

== Demographics ==
Historical population
Census	Pop.	Note	%±
2000	13,479		—
2010	15,536		15.3%
2020	12,042		−22.5%
U.S. Decennial Census; 1860–1870 1880-1890; 1900 1910 1920; 1930 1940 1950; 1960 1970 1980; 1990 2000 2010

Alum Rock first appeared as a census designated place in the 2000 U.S. census.

The 2020 United States census reported that the CDP had a population of 12,042. The population density was 13,857.3 inhabitants per square mile (5,350.3/km^{2}). The racial makeup of the CDP was 16.7% White, 1.4% African American, 3.4% Native American, 19.0% Asian, 0.3% Pacific Islander, 43.3% from other races, and 15.8% from two or more races. Hispanic or Latino of any race were 67.1% of the population.

The census reported that 98.7% of the population lived in households, 0.4% lived in non-institutionalized group quarters, and 1.0% were institutionalized.

There were 2,922 households, out of which 47.1% included children under the age of 18, 53.1% were married-couple households, 7.2% were cohabiting couple households, 24.0% had a female householder with no partner present, and 15.7% had a male householder with no partner present. 14.1% of households were one person, and 5.8% were one person aged 65 or older. The average household size was 4.07. There were 2,332 families (79.8% of all households).

The age distribution was 23.4% under the age of 18, 10.3% aged 18 to 24, 29.1% aged 25 to 44, 25.5% aged 45 to 64, and 11.7% who were 65 years of age or older. The median age was 35.8 years. For every 100 females, there were 103.8 males.

There were 3,029 housing units at an average density of 3,485.6 units per square mile (1,345.8 units/km^{2}), of which 2,922 (96.5%) were occupied. Of these, 62.0% were owner-occupied, and 38.0% were occupied by renters.

In 2023, the US Census Bureau estimated that 45.3% of the population were foreign-born. Of all people aged 5 or older, 27.3% spoke only English at home, 54.6% spoke Spanish, 1.9% spoke other Indo-European languages, 16.0% spoke Asian or Pacific Islander languages, and 0.2% spoke other languages. Of those aged 25 or older, 66.8% were high school graduates and 19.8% had a bachelor's degree.

The median household income was $111,976, and the per capita income was $34,255. About 5.1% of families and 8.7% of the population were below the poverty line.

== Government ==
In the California State Legislature, Alum Rock is in the 15th senatorial district, represented by Democrat Dave Cortese, and in the 25th Assembly district, represented by Democrat Ash Kalra.

In the United States House of Representatives, Alum Rock is in California's 18th congressional district, represented by Democrat Zoe Lofgren.

== Education ==
Most of Alum Rock CDP is in Alum Rock Union Elementary School District. A small portion is in Mount Pleasant Elementary School District. All of it is in East Side Union High School District.
