= East Foothills, California =

East Foothills
- Census designated place
- Location in Santa Clara County and the state of California

- Location in the United States
- Coordinates: 37°23′2″N 121°49′21″W
- Country: United States
- State: California
- County: Santa Clara

Area
  - Total: 2.13 sq mi (5.51 km^{2})
  - Land: 2.13 sq mi (5.51 km^{2})
  - Water: 0 sq mi (0.00 km^{2}) 0%
- Elevation: 351 ft (107 m)

Population (2020)
  - Total: 6,803
  - Density: 3,196.1/sq mi (1,234.01/km^{2})
- Time zone: UTC-8 (Pacific)
  - Summer (DST): UTC-7 (PDT)
- ZIP code: 95127
- Area codes: 408/669
- FIPS code: 06-20598
- GNIS feature ID: 1867015

East Foothills is a census-designated place (CDP) in Santa Clara County, California, United States and is adjacent to San Jose. The population was 6,803 at the 2020 census and it is located about 4 miles (6.4 km) east of downtown San Jose.

== Geography ==
East Foothills is located at 37°23′2″N 121°49′21″W (37.383989, -121.822396).

According to the United States Census Bureau, the CDP has a total area of 2.1 square miles (5.4 km^{2}), all of it land.

== Demographics ==
Historical population
Census	Pop.	Note	%±
2000	8,133		—
2010	8,269		1.7%
2020	6,803		−17.7%
U.S. Decennial Census

=== 2020 census ===
As of the 2020 census, East Foothills had a population of 6,803. The population density was 3,195.4 inhabitants per square mile (1,233.8/km^{2}). The median age was 44.6 years. The age distribution was 18.3% under the age of 18, 8.0% aged 18 to 24, 24.2% aged 25 to 44, 30.1% aged 45 to 64, and 19.4% who were 65 years of age or older. For every 100 females, there were 108.0 males, and for every 100 females age 18 and over, there were 105.2 males.

The census reported that 98.9% of the population lived in households, 1.1% lived in non-institutionalized group quarters, and no one was institutionalized. In total, 99.8% of residents lived in urban areas and 0.2% lived in rural areas.

There were 2,170 households, out of which 30.2% included children under the age of 18, 60.9% were married-couple households, 4.2% were cohabiting couple households, 20.0% had a female householder with no partner present, and 14.9% had a male householder with no partner present. 16.2% of households were one person, and 9.0% were one person aged 65 or older. The average household size was 3.1. There were 1,693 families (78.0% of all households).

There were 2,240 housing units at an average density of 1,052.1 units per square mile (406.2 units/km^{2}), of which 2,170 (96.9%) were occupied. Of occupied units, 84.0% were owner-occupied and 16.0% were occupied by renters. The homeowner vacancy rate was 0.5%, and the rental vacancy rate was 6.2%.

Racial composition as of the 2020 census
Race	Number	Percent
White	2,722	40.0%
Black or African American	119	1.7%
American Indian and Alaska Native	88	1.3%
Asian	1,747	25.7%
Native Hawaiian and Other Pacific Islander	26	0.4%
Some other race	1,023	15.0%
Two or more races	1,078	15.8%
Hispanic or Latino (of any race)	2,205	32.4%

=== Demographic estimates ===
In 2023, the US Census Bureau estimated that 30.0% of the population were foreign-born. Of all people aged 5 or older, 52.3% spoke only English at home, 21.4% spoke Spanish, 8.3% spoke other Indo-European languages, 17.4% spoke Asian or Pacific Islander languages, and 0.6% spoke other languages. Of those aged 25 or older, 88.1% were high school graduates and 47.8% had a bachelor's degree.

=== Income and poverty ===
The median household income was $188,558, and the per capita income was $68,326. About 1.0% of families and 5.6% of the population were below the poverty line.

=== 2010 census ===
The 2010 United States census reported that East Foothills had a population of 8,269. The population density was 3,622.1 inhabitants per square mile (1,398.5/km^{2}). The racial makeup of East Foothills was 4,853 (58.7%) White, 205 (2.5%) African American, 78 (0.9%) Native American, 1,445 (17.5%) Asian, 41 (0.5%) Pacific Islander, 1,219 (14.7%) from other races, and 428 (5.2%) from two or more races. Hispanic or Latino of any race were 3,118 persons (37.7%).

The Census reported that 8,238 people (99.6% of the population) lived in households, 26 (0.3%) lived in non-institutionalized group quarters, and 5 (0.1%) were institutionalized.

There were 2,698 households, out of which 928 (34.4%) had children under the age of 18 living in them, 1,631 (60.5%) were opposite-sex married couples living together, 284 (10.5%) had a female householder with no husband present, 148 (5.5%) had a male householder with no wife present. There were 111 (4.1%) unmarried opposite-sex partnerships, and 29 (1.1%) same-sex married couples or partnerships. 475 households (17.6%) were made up of individuals, and 248 (9.2%) had someone living alone who was 65 years of age or older. The average household size was 3.05. There were 2,063 families (76.5% of all households); the average family size was 3.42.

The population was spread out, with 1,820 people (22.0%) under the age of 18, 698 people (8.4%) aged 18 to 24, 1,936 people (23.4%) aged 25 to 44, 2,521 people (30.5%) aged 45 to 64, and 1,294 people (15.6%) who were 65 years of age or older. The median age was 42.0 years. For every 100 females, there were 99.9 males. For every 100 females age 18 and over, there were 96.7 males.

There were 2,830 housing units at an average density of 1,239.6 units per square mile (478.6 units/km^{2}), of which 2,269 (84.1%) were owner-occupied, and 429 (15.9%) were occupied by renters. The homeowner vacancy rate was 1.3%; the rental vacancy rate was 5.3%. 6,767 people (81.8% of the population) lived in owner-occupied housing units and 1,471 people (17.8%) lived in rental housing units.

== Government ==
In the California State Assembly, East Foothills is split between the 10th senatorial district, seat currently vacant and the 15th senatorial district, represented by Democrat Dave Cortese. In the California State Senate, it is split between the 24th Assembly district, represented by Democrat Alex Lee and the 25th Assembly district, represented by Democrat Ash Kalra.

In the United States House of Representatives, East Foothills is in California's 18th congressional district, represented by Democrat Zoe Lofgren.

== Education ==
Most of East Foothills is in Alum Rock Union Elementary School District. A small portion is in Berryessa Union Elementary School District. All of it is in East Side Union High School District.
