= West Santa Clara, California =

Unincorporated community in California, United States

West Santa Clara
- census county division (CCD)
- Location in the United States
- Coordinates: 37°18′21″N 122°7′23″W
- Country: United States
- State: California
- County: Santa Clara

Area
  - Total: 49.716 sq mi (128.765 km^{2})
  - Land: 49.584 sq mi (128.423 km^{2})
  - Water: 0.132 sq mi (0.342 km^{2}) 0.003%
- Elevation: 2,136 ft (651 m)

Population (2010)
  - Total: 7,529
  - Density: 151.8/sq mi (58.63/km^{2})
- Time zone: UTC-8 (PST)
  - Summer (DST): UTC-7 (PDT)
- ZIP code(s): 94022, 94024, 94028, 94304, 95014, 95070
- Area codes: 408, 650
- FIPS code: 06-08593660
- GNIS feature ID: 1935372

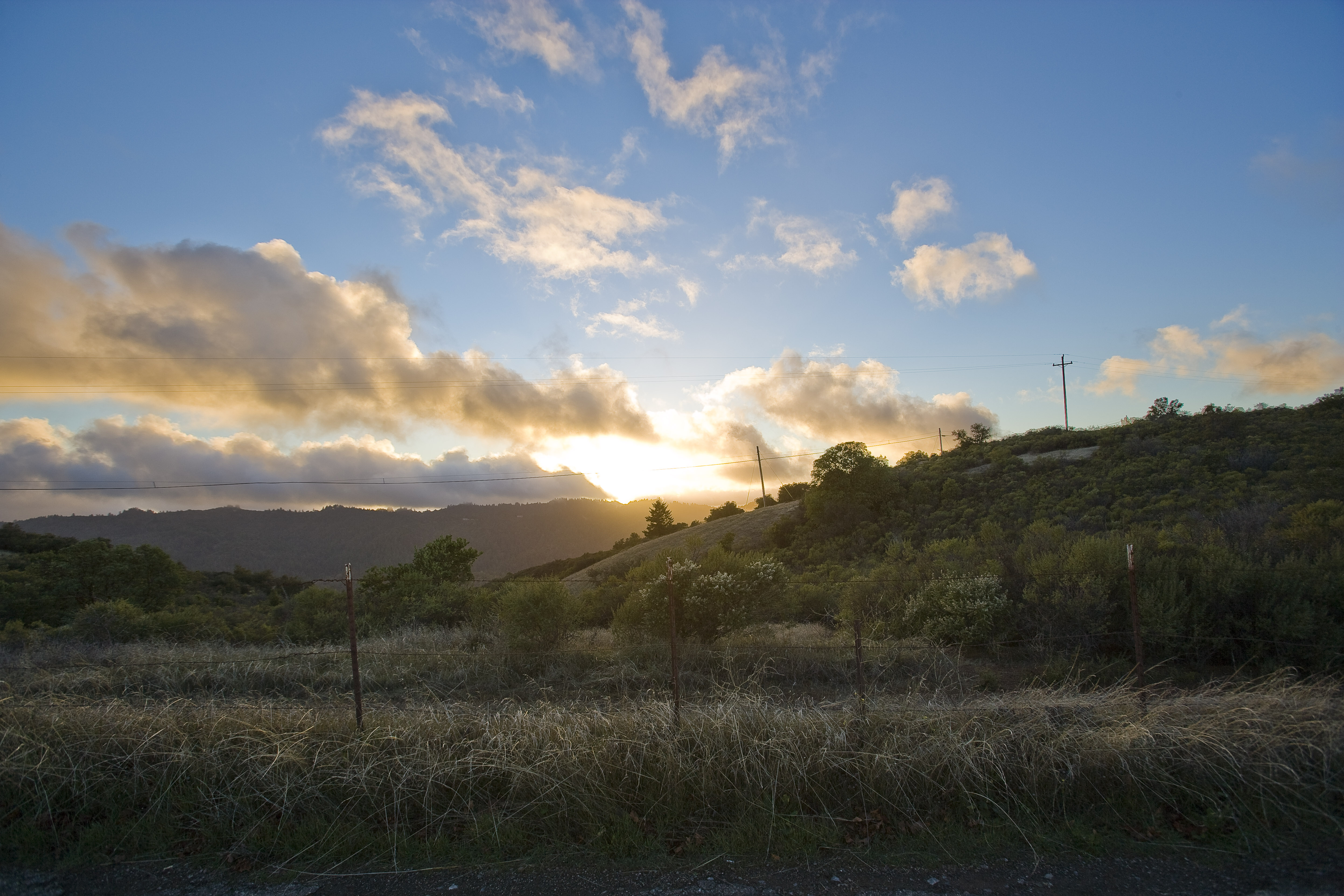

West Santa Clara is an unincorporated census county division (CCD) located on the eastern side of the Santa Cruz Mountains in northwest Santa Clara County, California. The area covers approximately 50 square miles (130 km^{2}), much of it open space, and contains Boronda Lake, Felt Lake, and Lake Ranch reservoirs, as well as Sanborn and Stevens Creek county parks. The Foothills, Los Trancos, Monte Bello, Pearson-Arastradero, Picchetti Ranch, Rancho San Antonio and Saratoga Gap preserves are also located in the area.

As of the 2010 US Census, the population was 7,529 residents of whom 67.7% were non-Hispanic white, 22.8% Asian, 4.8% Hispanic, and 4.7% of other races, with a median age of 50.0 years old. As of 2009, the median income was $169,186 and median home price $1,527,451.

Most residents and businesses in the area use postal zip codes from neighboring cities of Palo Alto, Portola Valley, Los Altos Hills, Cupertino, and Saratoga. The telephone area codes are 408 (Santa Clara County), and 650 (overlaps with San Mateo County).

== Climate ==
The region lies on the northeastern side of the Santa Cruz Mountains, and supports a relatively cool Mediterranean climate.
