= Montebello Elementary School District =

Defunct school district in California, United States

Montebello School District

Location
- 15101 Montebello Rd, Cupertino, California 95014 United States

District information
- Grades: K-3
- Established: 1892
- Closed: 2009

Montebello School District was a public school district based in Santa Clara County, California, United States. It was founded in 1892 and operated a single elementary school in the hills above Cupertino for 117 years until it was closed in 2009 due to low enrollment.

The three-room school was established to serve ranching families on Montebello Ridge. Enrollment peaked at just under 50 in the 1990s and early 2000s, but most of the land in the area is owned either by a small number of landowners or by the Monte Bello Open Space Preserve, and the drive up to the school discouraged parents living farther away from enrolling their children. Enrollment was nine in the final year; the district board of trustees asked for a waiver to close the school and disband in June 2009, before reaching the state-mandated minimum of seven. On August 11, 2009, the Santa Clara County Board of Supervisors designated the school as a landmark.
