= Loyola, California =

Unincorporated community in California, United States

Loyola
- Census-designated place
- Location in Santa Clara County and the state of California

- Location in the United States
- Coordinates: 37°21′5″N 122°6′2″W
- Country: United States
- State: California
- County: Santa Clara

Area
  - Total: 1.390 sq mi (3.601 km^{2})
  - Land: 1.390 sq mi (3.601 km^{2})
  - Water: 0 sq mi (0 km^{2}) 0%
- Elevation: 246 ft (75 m)

Population (2020)
  - Total: 3,491
  - Density: 2,511/sq mi (969.5/km^{2})
- Time zone: UTC-8 (Pacific)
  - Summer (DST): UTC-7 (PDT)
- ZIP code: 94024
- Area code: 650
- FIPS code: 06-44378
- GNIS feature IDs: 1867038, 2408147

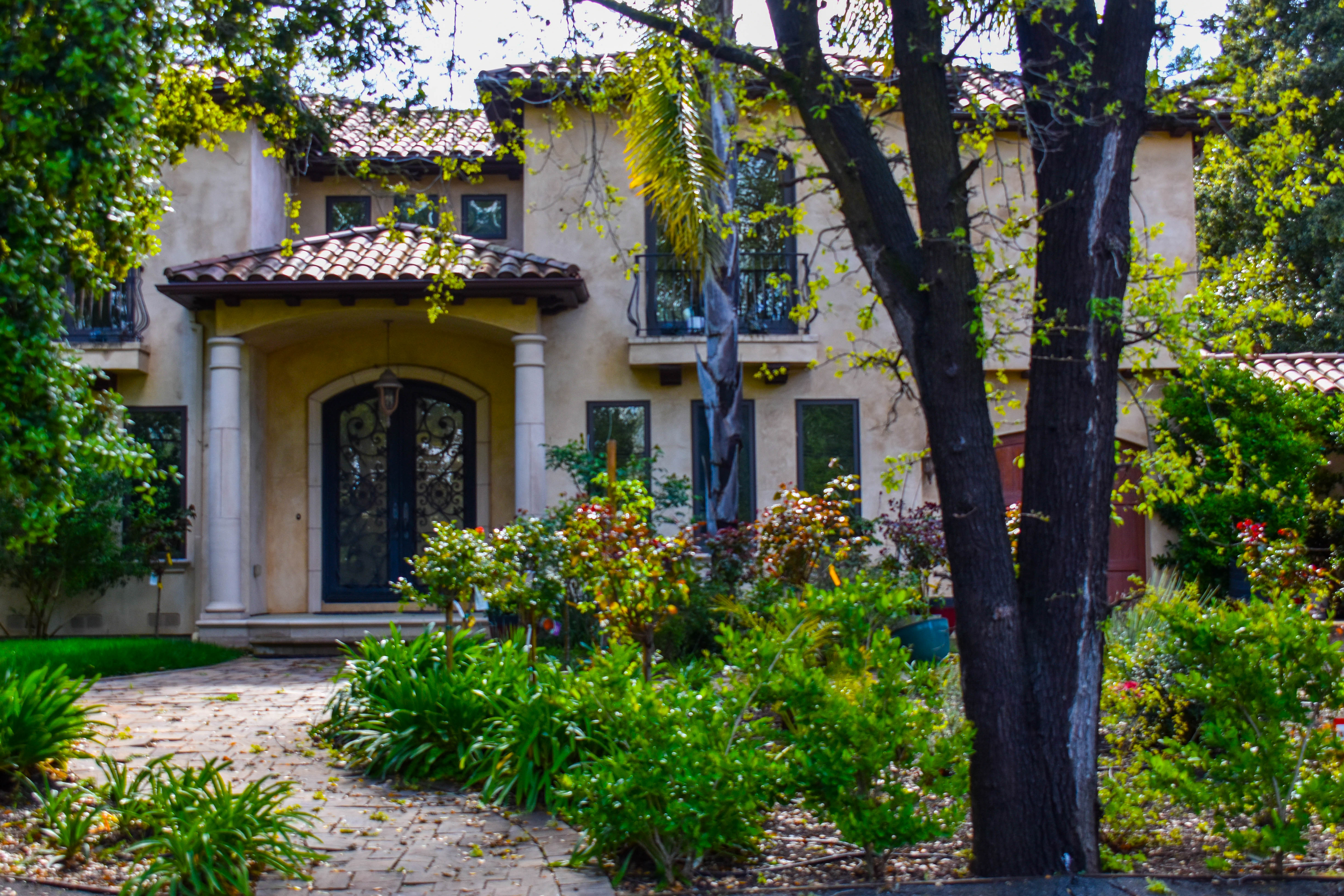
Loyola, CA

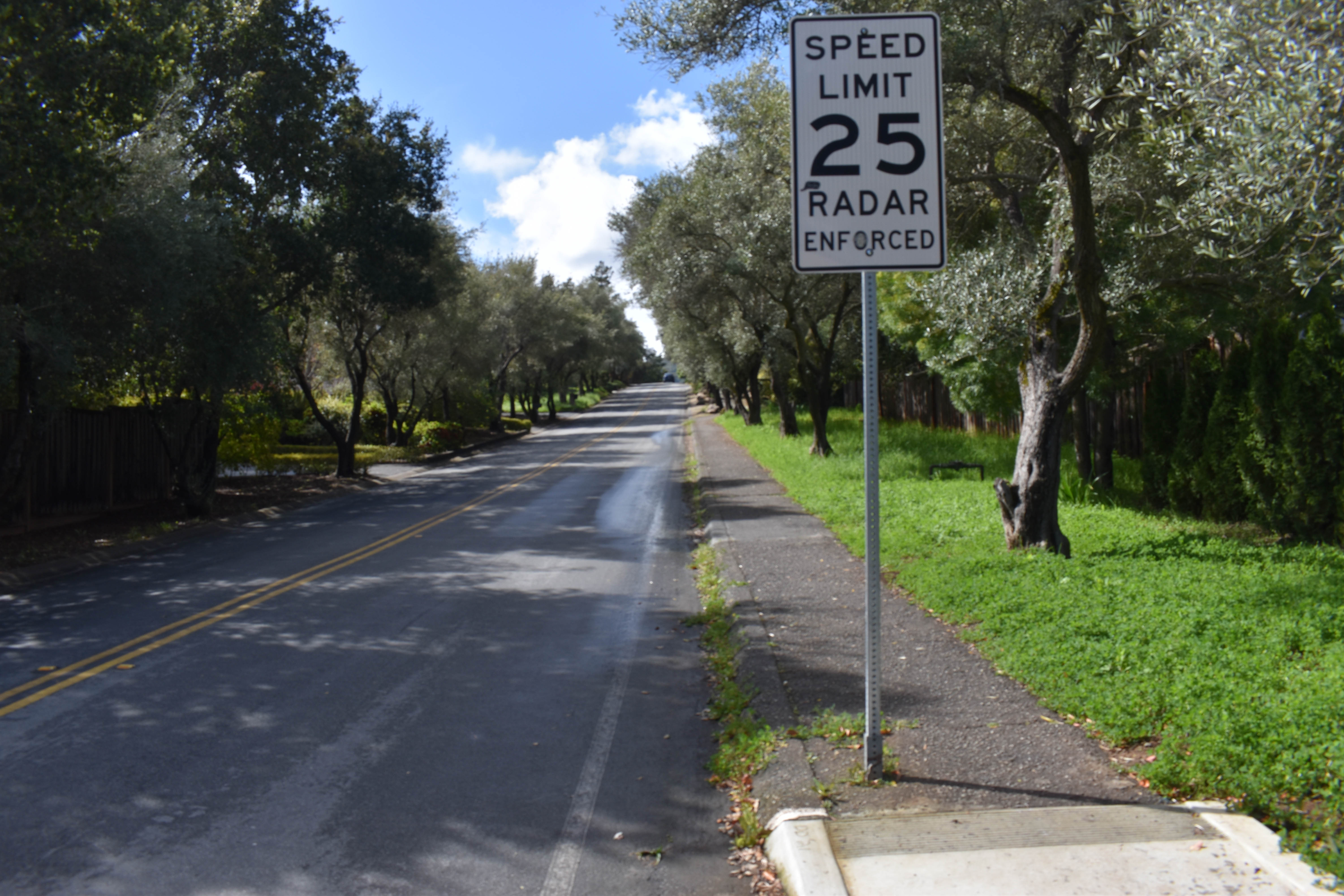
Olive Trees

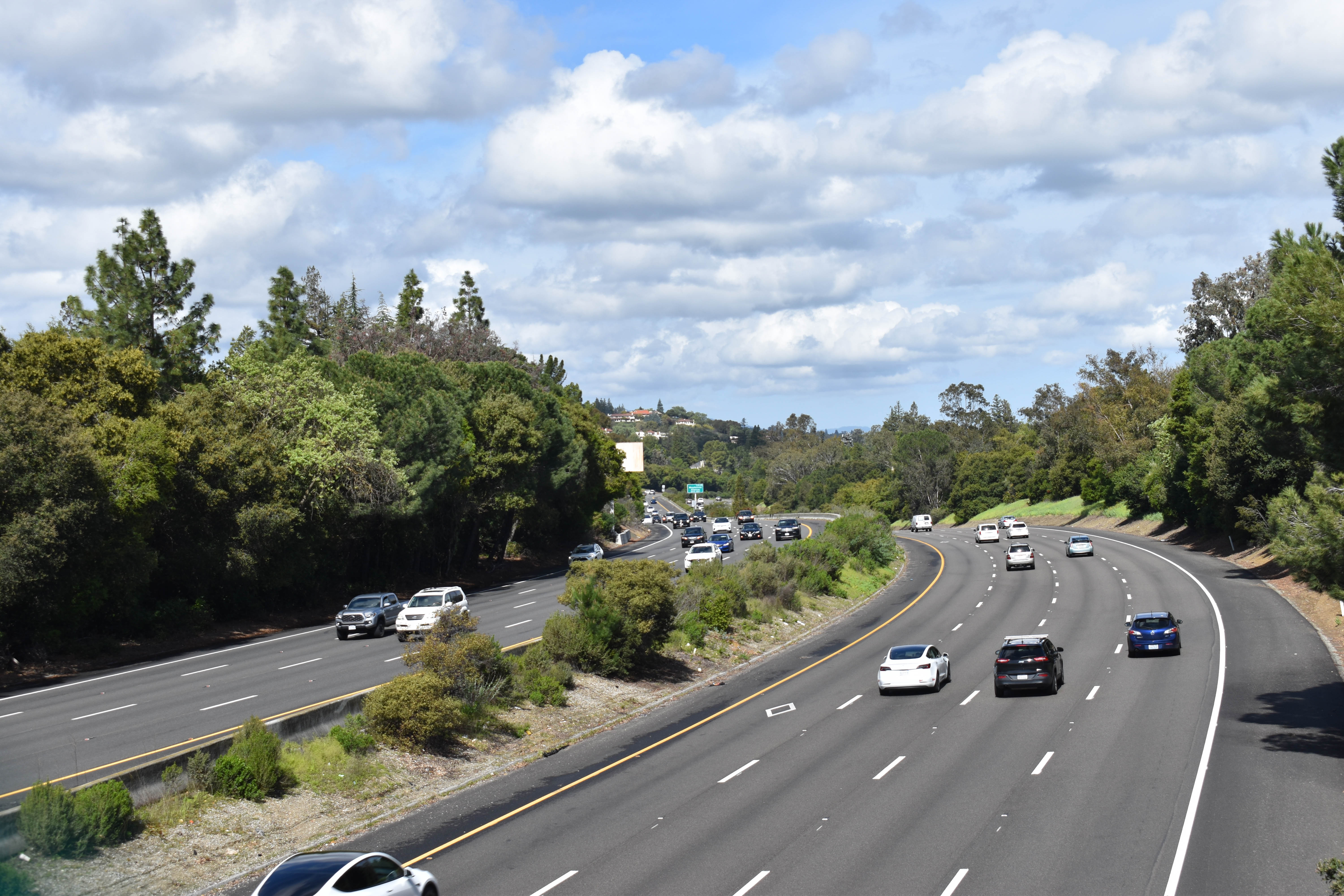
280, Loyola, Los Altos, CA

Loyola is an official census-designated place in Santa Clara County, California, United States. The population was 3,491 at the 2020 census. It was ranked as one of the wealthiest neighborhoods in America, with homes ranging from cottages to sprawling ranch houses and mansions. The woodsy area is the home of the Los Altos Golf & Country Club and is located between the city of Los Altos and the town of Los Altos Hills. The neighborhood is named for Ignatius of Loyola, a Spanish saint and founder of the Jesuits.

== History ==
The name comes from a 1904 plan by the Jesuits of Santa Clara University to build a new university named for their founder, St. Ignatius of Loyola, in the area. If the plan had come to fruition, the university would have been located in the area of the present-day golf course on Country Club Drive. The Loyola project succumbed to delays and financing problems stemming from the 1906 San Francisco earthquake.

== Geography ==
Loyola is located at 37°21′5″N 122°6′2″W (37.351391, -122.100526).

According to the United States Census Bureau, the CDP has a total area of 1.4 square miles (3.6 km^{2}), all land.

== Demographics ==
Historical population
Census	Pop.	Note	%±
1990	3,076		—
2000	3,478		13.1%
2010	3,261		−6.2%
2020	3,491		7.1%
U.S. Decennial Census; 1990 2000 2010

Loyola first appeared as a census designated place in the 1990 U.S. census.

=== 2020 census ===
As of the 2020 census, Loyola had a population of 3,491. The population density was 2,511.5 inhabitants per square mile (969.7/km^{2}). The age distribution was 24.3% under the age of 18, 6.8% aged 18 to 24, 15.6% aged 25 to 44, 30.7% aged 45 to 64, and 22.7% who were 65 years of age or older. The median age was 47.1 years. For every 100 females, there were 99.5 males, and for every 100 females age 18 and over, there were 99.5 males age 18 and over.

The Census reported that 100% of the population lived in households. In addition, 100.0% of residents lived in urban areas and 0.0% lived in rural areas.

There were 1,168 households, of which 38.3% had children under the age of 18. Of all households, 76.0% were married-couple households, 2.4% were cohabiting couple households, 12.3% had a female householder with no spouse or partner present, and 9.2% had a male householder with no spouse or partner present. About 12.6% of households were made up of individuals, and 7.4% had someone living alone who was 65 years of age or older. The average household size was 2.99, and there were 987 families (84.5% of all households).

There were 1,227 housing units at an average density of 882.7 units per square mile (340.8 units/km^{2}), of which 4.8% were vacant. Of the occupied units, 89.9% were owner-occupied and 10.1% were renter-occupied. The homeowner vacancy rate was 0.7% and the rental vacancy rate was 2.5%.

Racial composition as of the 2020 census
Race	Number	Percent
White	2,024	58.0%
Black or African American	18	0.5%
American Indian and Alaska Native	5	0.1%
Asian	1,109	31.8%
Native Hawaiian and Other Pacific Islander	6	0.2%
Some other race	46	1.3%
Two or more races	283	8.1%
Hispanic or Latino (of any race)	129	3.7%

=== Income and poverty ===
In 2023, the US Census Bureau estimated that the median household income was more than $250,000, and the per capita income was $138,495. About 1.4% of families and 2.1% of the population were below the poverty line.

=== 2010 census ===
The 2010 United States census reported that Loyola had a population of 3,261. The population density was 2,220.8 inhabitants per square mile (857.5/km^{2}). The racial makeup of Loyola was 2,291 (70.3%) White, 19 (0.6%) African American, 1 (0.0%) Native American, 760 (23.3%) Asian, 2 (0.1%) Pacific Islander, 37 (1.1%) from other races, and 151 (4.6%) from two or more races. Hispanic or Latino of any race were 114 persons (3.5%).

The Census reported that 100% of the population lived in households.

There were 1,163 households, out of which 446 (38.3%) had children under the age of 18 living in them, 877 (75.4%) were opposite-sex married couples living together, 52 (4.5%) had a female householder with no husband present, 27 (2.3%) had a male householder with no wife present. There were 30 (2.6%) unmarried opposite-sex partnerships, and 15 (1.3%) same-sex married couples or partnerships. 160 households (13.8%) were made up of individuals, and 95 (8.2%) had someone living alone who was 65 years of age or older. The average household size was 2.80. There were 956 families (82.2% of all households); the average family size was 3.06. The population was spread out, with 811 people (24.9%) under the age of 18, 133 people (4.1%) aged 18 to 24, 560 people (17.2%) aged 25 to 44, 1,107 people (33.9%) aged 45 to 64, and 650 people (19.9%) who were 65 years of age or older. The median age was 47.5 years. For every 100 females, there were 97.4 males. For every 100 females age 18 and over, there were 94.3 males.

There were 1,208 housing units at an average density of 822.7 per square mile (317.6/km^{2}), of which 1,055 (90.7%) were owner-occupied, and 108 (9.3%) were occupied by renters. The homeowner vacancy rate was 1.0%; the rental vacancy rate was 4.4%. 2,954 people (90.6% of the population) lived in owner-occupied housing units and 307 people (9.4%) lived in rental housing units.

== Government ==
In the California State Legislature, Loyola is in the 13th senatorial district, represented by Democrat Josh Becker, and in the 23rd Assembly district, represented by Democrat Marc Berman.

In the United States House of Representatives, Loyola is in California's 16th congressional district, represented by Democrat Sam Liccardo.

== Education ==
The Loyola CDP is served by the Los Altos School District (K-8) and Mountain View-Los Altos Union High School District (9–12).
