= Mount Pleasant Elementary School District =

Public schools in San Jose, California, United States

Address
- 3434 Marten Avenue San Jose, California, 95148; United States

District information
- Type: Public
- Grades: K–8
- NCES District ID: 0626400

Students and staff
- Students: 1,929 (2020–2021)
- Teachers: 85.47 (FTE)
- Staff: 89.97 (FTE)
- Student–teacher ratio: 22.57:1

Other information
- Website: www.mpesd.org

The Mount Pleasant Elementary School District operates five pre-high schools in San Jose, California, USA. The district has 143 teachers (FTEs) serving 2849 students.

School name	Students	FTE Teachers	Pupil/Teacher Ratio	Low grade	High grade
(August) Boeger Middle School	636	20.9	30.4	6th Grade	8th Grade
Ida Jew Elementary School	873	23.6	37	Kindergarten	5th Grade
Mount Pleasant Elementary School	392	17.8	22	Kindergarten	5th Grade
(Robert) Sanders Elementary School	468	17.6	26.6	Kindergarten	5th Grade
Valle Vista Elementary School	480	17.8	27	Kindergarten	5th Grade

Note: Based on 2002–2003 school year data
