= Alum Rock Union School District =

School district in California

Address
- 2930 Gay Avenue San Jose, California, 95127; United States

District information
- Type: Public
- Grades: K–8
- NCES District ID: 0602310

Students and staff
- Students: 8,652 (2020–2021)
- Teachers: 407.61 (FTE)
- Staff: 415.58 (FTE)
- Student–teacher ratio: 21.23:1

Other information
- Website: www.arusd.org

The Alum Rock Union School District (abbreviated ARUSD) operates thirteen elementary schools (K-5), four middle schools (6–8) and four TK-8th grade charters in the East San Jose and Alum Rock, San Jose neighborhoods of San Jose, California.

School facts
School name	Students	FTE teachers	Pupil/teacher ratio
Adelante Dual Language Academy	360
(Sylvia) Cassell Elementary School	56n	27	20.8
(Cesar) Chavez Elementary School	672	31	21.7
(Horace) Cureton Elementary School	618	33	18.7
(A.J.) Dorsa Elementary School	570	27	21.1
(Joseph) George Middle School	643	31	20.7
(O.S.) Hubbard Elementary School	455	20	22.8
Linda Vista Elementary School	662	32	20.7
L.U.C.H.A. Elementary School	225	11	20.4
Lyndale Elementary School	641	33	19.4
(Millard) McCollam Elementary School	596	29	20.6
James McEntee Academy	674
(Donald J.) Meyer Elementary School	630	31.5	20
Ocala Middle School	892	40	22.3
(Ben) Painter Elementary School	503	25	20.1
Renaissance Academy (of Arts, Science and Social Justice)	200	7	28
(Anthony) Russo Academy	674
(Thomas P.) Ryan Elementary School	568	27	21
San Antonio Elementary School	573	28.8	19.9
(William L.) Sheppard Middle School	675	33	20.5

The district closed Grandin Miller Elementary School in 2004, and closed Pala Middle School in 2010. In 1996, there was a stabbing assault incident that occurred in the back of Clyde L. Fischer Middle School. The victim died from his injuries. In 2021, Clyde Fischer and Lee Mathson middle schools were closed as a result of low enrollment.

== See also ==
- Alum Rock, California
