= 2012 San Jose City Council election =

Local election in California

- June 5 (primary); November 6 (runoff)

5 of 10 seats on San Jose City Council

The 2012 San Jose City Council election took place on June 5, 2012, to elect five of the ten seats of the San Jose City Council, with runoff elections taking place on November 6, 2012. Runoffs only occurred if no candidate received more than 50% of the votes cast in the contest. Local elections in California are officially nonpartisan. Each councilmember is term-limited after two consecutive terms in office.

== District 2 ==
Incumbent Ash Kalra was elected to the 2nd district in 2008 in the runoff with 54.4% of the vote. He was eligible for reelection.

=== Endorsements ===
Ash Kalra

Newspapers

- San Jose Inside

Labor unions

- IFPTE Local 21

Organizations

- Santa Clara County League of Conservation Voters

=== Results ===
2012 San Jose City Council 2nd district election
Primary election
Candidate	Votes	%
Ash Kalra (incumbent)	6,671	53.0
Tim Murphy	5,909	47.0
Total votes	12,580	100.0

== District 4 ==
Incumbent Kansen Chu was initially elected to the 4th district in a special election runoff in 2007, and was subsequently reelected in 2008. He was eligible for reelection.

=== Endorsements ===
Kansen Chu

Labor unions

- IFPTE Local 21

Organizations

- Santa Clara County League of Conservation Voters
Tam Truong

Individuals

- Madison Nguyen

=== Results ===
2012 San Jose City Council 4th district election
Primary election
Candidate	Votes	%
Kansen Chu (incumbent)	7,089	54.5
Tam Truong	4,975	38.2
Rafael Sabic	948	7.3
Total votes	13,012	100.0

== District 6 ==
Incumbent Pierluigi Oliverio was initially elected to the 6th district in a special election primary in 2007, and was subsequently reelected in 2008. He was eligible for reelection.

=== Endorsements ===
Pierluigi Oliverio

Newspapers

- San Jose Inside

Organizations

- San Jose/Silicon Valley Chamber of Commerce
- Santa Clara County League of Conservation Voters

Individuals

- Laurie Smith
Steve Kline

Political party organizations

- Santa Clara County Democratic Central Committee

=== Results ===
2012 San Jose City Council 6th district election
Primary election
Candidate	Votes	%
Pierluigi Oliverio (incumbent)	11,209	67.8
Steve Kline	4,148	25.1
Bill Chew	1,180	7.1
Total votes	16,537	100.0

== District 8 ==
Incumbent Rose Herrera was elected to the 8th district in 2008 in the runoff with 51.9% of the vote. She was eligible for reelection.

=== Endorsements ===
Rose Herrera

Newspapers

- San Jose Inside

Organizations

- Santa Clara County League of Conservation Voters
- Sierra Club Loma Prieta

Political party organizations

- Santa Clara County Democratic Central Committee

=== Results ===
2012 San Jose City Council 8th district election
Primary election
Candidate	Votes	%
Rose Herrera (incumbent)	7,242	47.9
Jimmy Nguyen	4,278	28.3
Patricia Martinez-Roach	3,610	23.9
Total votes	15,130	100.0
General election
Rose Herrera (incumbent)	17,331	54.3
Jimmy Nguyen	14,588	45.7
Total votes	31,919	100.0

== District 10 ==
Incumbent Nancy Pyle was elected to the 10th district in 2004 and 2008. She was ineligible for reelection.

=== Endorsements ===
Edesa Bitbadal

Organizations

- Santa Clara County League of Conservation Voters (primary election)

Labor unions

- AFL-CIO South Bay Labor Council (dual endorsement)

Individuals

- Elaine Alquist
- Anna Eshoo
- Madison Nguyen
- Nancy Pyle
Robert Braunstein

Organizations

- Santa Clara County League of Conservation Voters (runoff election)
- Sierra Club Loma Prieta
- Silicon Valley Young Democrats
Brian O'Neill

Political party organizations

- Santa Clara County Democratic Central Committee

Labor unions

- AFL-CIO South Bay Labor Council (dual endorsement)
Johnny Khamis

Organizations

- Silicon Valley Taxpayers Association

=== Results ===
2012 San Jose City Council 10th district election
Primary election
Candidate	Votes	%
Johnny Khamis	3,483	19.7
Robert Braunstein	3,482	19.7
Edesa Bitbadal	3,392	19.2
Leslie Reynolds	3,174	18.0
Brian O'Neill	2,152	12.2
Denelle Fedor	1,990	11.3
Total votes	17,673	100.0
General election
Johnny Khamis	17,834	52.6
Robert Braunstein	16,089	47.4
Total votes	33,923	100.0
