= 2020 San Jose City Council election =

Local election in California

- March 3 (primary); November 3 (runoff)

5 of 10 seats on San Jose City Council

The 2020 San Jose City Council election took place on March 3, 2020, to elect five of the ten seats of the San Jose City Council, with runoff elections taking place on November 3, 2020. Runoffs only occurred if no candidate received more than 50% of the votes cast in the contest. Local elections in California are officially nonpartisan. Each councilmember is term-limited after two consecutive terms in office.

== District 2 ==
Incumbent Sergio Jimenez was elected to the 2nd district in 2016 in the runoff with 55.0% of the vote. He was eligible for reelection.

=== Endorsements ===
Sergio Jimenez

Organizations

- Bay Area Municipal Elections Commission (BAYMEC)
- Dean Democratic Club of Silicon Valley
- Sierra Club Loma Prieta Chapter

Newspapers

- The Mercury News

Labor unions

- AFSCME Council 57
- IFPTE Local 21
- SEIU 521
- AFL-CIO South Bay Labor Council
- UA Local 393

Individuals

- Mike Wasserman
- Zoe Lofgren
- Ro Khanna

Political organizations

- Santa Clara County Democratic Party
- Silicon Valley Democratic Socialists of America
Jonathan Fleming

Organizations

- Business San Jose Chamber PAC
- Silicon Valley Taxpayers Association

Individuals

- Johnny Khamis
- Chuck Reed

=== Results ===
2020 San Jose City Council 2nd district election
Primary election
Candidate	Votes	%
Sergio Jimenez (incumbent)	12,891	58.5
Jonathan Fleming	9,139	41.5
Total votes	22,030	100.0

== District 4 ==
Incumbent Lan Diep was elected to the 4th district in 2016 in the primary with 50.1% of the vote. He was eligible for reelection.

=== Endorsements ===
David Cohen

Political organizations

- Santa Clara County Democratic Party (dual endorsement)
- Silicon Valley Young Democrats

Organizations

- Bay Area Municipal Elections Commission (BAYMEC)
- Dean Democratic Club of Silicon Valley
- League of Conservation Voters
- Sierra Club Loma Prieta Chapter

Labor unions

- AFSCME Council 57 (runoff election)
- IFPTE Local 21 (runoff election)
- Teamsters 856
- Teamsters Joint Council 7 (dual endorsement)
- SEIU 521 (dual endorsement)
- AFL-CIO South Bay Labor Council (dual endorsement)
- UA Local 393 (dual endorsement)

Individuals

- Jim Beall
- Susan Ellenberg
- Bob Wieckowski
- Betty Yee
Huy Tran

Labor unions

- AFSCME Council 57 (primary election)
- IFPTE Local 21 (primary election)
- Teamsters Joint Council 7 (dual endorsement)
- SEIU 521 (dual endorsement)
- AFL-CIO South Bay Labor Council (dual endorsement)
- UA Local 393 (dual endorsement)

Political organizations

- Santa Clara County Democratic Party (dual endorsement)
- Silicon Valley Democratic Socialists of America

Newspapers

- The Mercury News

Individuals

- Magdalena Carrasco
- Ash Kalra
- Sam Liccardo
- Evan Low
- Raul Peralez
- Ann Ravel
- Chuck Reed

Organizations

- Progressive Vietnamese American Organization
Lan Diep

Organizations

- Business San Jose Chamber PAC
- California Apartment Association
- Santa Clara County Association of Realtors
- SVO PAC

Individuals

- Carl Guardino
Jamal Khan

Organizations

- Bangladeshi American Democratic Council

=== Results ===
2020 San Jose City Council 4th district election
Primary election
Candidate	Votes	%
David Cohen	7,417	36.5
Lan Diep (incumbent)	6,756	33.2
Huy Tran	4,740	23.3
Jamal Khan	1,417	7.0
Total votes	20,330	100.0
General election
David Cohen	20,030	51.3
Lan Diep (incumbent)	18,993	48.7
Total votes	39,023	100.0

== District 6 ==
Incumbent Dev Davis was elected to the 6th district in 2016 in the runoff with 53.8% of the vote. She was eligible for reelection.

=== Endorsements ===
Jake Tonkel

Labor unions

- AFSCME Council 57
- IFPTE Local 21
- Teamsters 856
- Teamsters Joint Council 7
- San Jose Firefighters Local 230
- Santa Clara County Single Payer Health Care Coalition
- SEIU 521
- AFL-CIO South Bay Labor Council
- UA Local 393

Political organizations

- Green Party of Santa Clara County
- Silicon Valley Democratic Socialists of America

Organizations

- Bay Area Rising Action
- California Nurses Association
- San José Teachers Association
- Santa Clara County Single Payer Health Care Coalition
- Silicon Valley Taxpayers Association
- Sierra Club Loma Prieta Chapter (dual endorsement)
- South Bay YIMBY

Individuals

- Magdalena Carrasco
- Raul Peralez
- Jim Beall
Dev Davis

Organizations

- Bay Area Municipal Elections Commission (BAYMEC)
- California Apartment Association
- Citizens for Fiscal Responsibility
- League of Conservation Voters
- Santa Clara County Association of Realtors
- Sierra Club Loma Prieta Chapter (dual endorsement)
- Silicon Valley Taxpayers Association
- Silicon Valley Organization PAC

Individuals

- Susan Ellenberg
- Frank Fiscalini
- Nancy Ianni
- Chappie Jones
- Johnny Khamis
- Sam Liccardo
- Pierluigi Oliverio
- Chuck Reed

Newspapers

- The Mercury News
Ruben Navarro

Political organizations

- Santa Clara County Democratic Party

Individuals

- Ash Kalra
- Evan Low

=== Results ===
2020 San Jose City Council 6th district election
Primary election
Candidate	Votes	%
Dev Davis (incumbent)	13,175	48.4
Jake Tonkel	7,596	27.9
Ruben Navarro	4,557	16.7
Marshall Woodmansee	1,910	7.0
Total votes	27,238	100.0
General election
Dev Davis (incumbent)	24,340	53.9
Jake Tonkel	20,840	46.1
Total votes	45,180	100.0

== District 8 ==
Incumbent Sylvia Arenas was elected to the 8th district in 2016 in the runoff with 50.1% of the vote. She was eligible for reelection.

=== Endorsements ===
Sylvia Arenas

Labor unions

- IFPTE Local 21
- SEIU 521
- AFL-CIO South Bay Labor Council
- UA Local 393

Political organizations

- Santa Clara County Democratic Party
- Silicon Valley Democratic Socialists of America

Organizations

- Bay Area Municipal Elections Commission (BAYMEC)
- Sierra Club Loma Prieta Chapter
Jim Zito

Organizations

- The Lincoln Club of Northern California

=== Results ===
2020 San Jose City Council 8th district election
Primary election
Candidate	Votes	%
Sylvia Arenas (incumbent)	13,886	60.6
Jim Zito	9,035	39.4
Total votes	22,921	100.0

== District 10 ==
Incumbent Johnny Khamis was elected to the 10th district in 2012 and 2016. He was ineligible for reelection.

=== Endorsements ===
Jenny Higgins Bradanini

Labor unions

- AFSCME Council 57
- IFPTE Local 21
- Teamsters Joint Council 7
- SEIU 521
- AFL-CIO South Bay Labor Council
- UA Local 393

Political organizations

- Santa Clara County Democratic Party
- Silicon Valley Democratic Club

Individuals

- Cindy Chavez
- Sergio Jimenez
- Ash Kalra
Matt Mahan

Organizations

- Bay Area Municipal Elections Commission (BAYMEC)
- Business San Jose Chamber PAC (dual endorsement)
- Santa Clara County Association of Realtors
- Sierra Club Loma Prieta Chapter
- Silicon Valley Organization PAC

Individuals

- Lan Diep
- Pam Foley
- Chappie Jones
- Sam Liccardo
- Larry Stone
Helen P. Wang

Organizations

- Business San Jose Chamber PAC (dual endorsement)
- The Lincoln Club of Northern California

Individuals

- Tom Campbell
- Ling Ling Chang
- Vince Fong
- Bob Nuñez
- Steve Poizner

=== Results ===
2020 San Jose City Council 10th district election
Primary election
Candidate	Votes	%
Matt Mahan	15,387	58.5
Helen P. Wang	5,865	22.3
Jenny Higgins Bradanini	5,031	19.1
Total votes	26,283	100.0
