= 2016 San Jose City Council election =

Local election in California

- June 7 (primary); November 8 (runoff)

5 of 10 seats on San Jose City Council

The 2016 San Jose City Council election took place on June 7, 2016, to elect five of the ten seats of the San Jose City Council, with runoff elections taking place on November 8, 2016. Runoffs only occurred if no candidate received more than 50% of the votes cast in the contest. Local elections in California are officially nonpartisan. Each councilmember is term-limited after two consecutive terms in office.

== District 2 ==
Incumbent Ash Kalra was elected to the 2nd district in 2008 and 2012. He was ineligible for reelection.

=== Endorsements ===
Sergio Jimenez

Labor unions

- Association of Retired San Jose Police Officers & Firefighters
- East Side Teacher's Association
- IFPTE Local 21
- International Union of Bricklayers and Allied Craftworkers Local 3 California
- International Union of Operating Engineers California Local 3
- Oak Grove Educators Association
- San Jose Fire Fighters Local 230
- San Jose Police Officers Association
- San Jose Teachers Association
- AFL-CIO South Bay Labor Council
- Teamsters 856
- UA Local 393

Organizations

- Dean Democratic Club of Silicon Valley (runoff election)
- Democratic Activists for Women Now (DAWN)
- Evolve California
- League of Conservation Voters of Santa Clara County
- Planned Parenthood Advocates Mar Monte
- Santa Clara County League of Conservation Voters (dual endorsement)
- Sierra Club Loma Prieta
- Silicon Valley Asian Pacific American Democratic Club
- Silicon Valley Democratic Club
- Silicon Valley Hispanic Chamber of Commerce
- Silicon Valley Latino Democratic Forum
- Silicon Valley Young Democrats
- South County Democratic Club

Individuals

- Jim Beall
- Dominic Caserta
- Kansen Chu
- Ash Kalra
- Zoe Lofgren
- Evan Low
- Bill Monning
- Tam Nguyen
- Raul Peralez
- Donald Rocha
- Mark Stone
- Bob Wieckowski

Political party organizations

- Santa Clara County Democratic Party
- Silicon Valley Young Democrats (dual endorsement)

Newspapers

- San Jose Inside
Eli Portales

Organizations

- Dean Democratic Club of Silicon Valley (primary election)
- Silicon Valley Young Democrats (dual endorsement)
Steve Brown

Organizations

- Citizens for Fiscal Responsibility
- The Lincoln Club of Northern California
- San Jose Silicon Valley Chamber of Commerce
- Santa Clara County Association of Realtors

Political party organizations

- Santa Clara County Republican Party
- Silicon Valley Association of Republican Women

Individuals

- Jose Esteves
- Glenn Hendricks
- Johnny Khamis
- Van Le
- Chuck Reed
- Forrest Williams

=== Results ===
2016 San Jose City Council 2nd district election
Primary election
Candidate	Votes	%
Sergio Jimenez	5,953	32.9
Steve Brown	5,790	32.0
Joe Lopez	4,136	22.8
Eli Portales	2,238	12.4
Total votes	18,117	100.0
General election
Sergio Jimenez	17,629	55.0
Steve Brown	14,441	45.0
Total votes	32,070	100.0

== District 4 ==
Kansen Chu was initially elected to the 4th district in a special election runoff in 2007, and was subsequently reelected in 2008 and 2012. Chu resigned his City Council seat in 2014 before the end of his term after winning a seat in the State Assembly in the November 2014 general election. Manh Nguyen won the special election runoff in June 2015 for the remainder of Chu's term.

=== Endorsements ===
Manh Nguyen

Labor unions

- International Union of Bricklayers and Allied Craftworkers Local 3 California
- UA Local 393

Individuals

- Sam Liccardo
- Chuck Reed
Lan Diep

Political party organizations

- California Republican Assembly

=== Results ===
2016 San Jose City Council 4th district election
Primary election
Candidate	Votes	%
Lan Diep	8,689	50.1
Manh Nguyen (incumbent)	8,661	49.9
Total votes	17,350	100.0

== District 6 ==
Incumbent Pierluigi Oliverio was initially elected to the 6th district in a special election primary in 2007, and was subsequently reelected in 2008 and 2012. He was ineligible for reelection.

=== Endorsements ===
Helen K. Chapman

Labor unions

- AFSCME Council 57
- AFSCME Local 101
- Association of Retired San Jose Police Officers & Fire Fighters
- Carpenters Local 405
- Communications Workers of America, Local 332
- IBEW Local 332
- IFPTE Local 21 (dual endorsement)
- International Union of Bricklayers and Allied Craftworkers Local 3 California
- International Union of Operating Engineers California Local 3
- Laborers Local Union 270
- National Association of Letter Carriers
- Plumbers, Steamfitters & Refrigeration Fitters, Local 393
- San Jose Fire Fighters, Local 230
- San Jose Police Officers' Association
- San Jose Teachers Association
- SEIU - United Service Workers West
- AFL-CIO South Bay Labor Council
- Teamsters 856
- Teamsters Joint Council 7
- UA Local 393

Organizations

- Dean Democratic Club of Silicon Valley
- Democratic Activists for Women Now (DAWN)
- Evolve California
- Planned Parenthood Mar Monte
- Santa Clara County League of Conservation Voters
- Sierra Club Loma Prieta
- Silicon Valley Asian Pacific American Democratic Club
- Silicon Valley Democratic Club
- Silicon Valley Latino Democratic Forum
- Silicon Valley Young Democrats

Political party organizations

- Santa Clara County Democratic Club
- Santa Clara County Democratic Party
- Silicon Valley Young Democrats (dual endorsement)

Individuals

- Jim Beall
- Magdalena Carrasco
- Dominic Caserta
- Kansen Chu
- Jim Davis
- Kevin de León
- Ash Kalra
- Rishi Kumar
- Gustav Larsson
- Zoe Lofgren
- Evan Low
- Tam Nguyen
- Raul Peralez
- Donald Rocha
- Mark Stone
- Bob Wieckowski
- Betty Yee
Erik Nicholas Fong

Labor unions

- IFPTE Local 21 (dual endorsement)
Peter Allen

Political party organizations

- Silicon Valley Young Democrats (dual endorsement)
Dev Davis

Organizations

- Citizens for Fiscal Responsibility
- The Lincoln Club of Northern California
- San Jose Silicon Valley Chamber of Commerce PAC
- Santa Clara County Association of Realtors
- Silicon Valley Chinese Association

Individuals

- Rose Herrera
- Johnny Khamis
- Chuck Reed

Political party organizations

- Santa Clara County Republican Party
Norm Kline

Individuals

- Sam Liccardo

=== Results ===
2016 San Jose City Council 6th district election
Primary election
Candidate	Votes	%
Dev Davis	4,801	20.5
Helen K. Chapman	4,715	20.2
Norm Kline	3,852	16.5
Ruben Navarro	2,314	9.9
Peter Allen	2,241	9.6
Erik Nicholas Fong	2,086	8.9
Chris Roth	1,855	7.9
Myron Von Raesfeld	1,507	6.4
Total votes	23,371	100.0
General election
Dev Davis	20,360	53.8
Helen K. Chapman	17,450	46.2
Total votes	37,810	100.0

== District 8 ==
Incumbent Rose Herrera was elected to the 8th district in 2008 and 2012. She was ineligible for reelection.

=== Endorsements ===
Sylvia Arenas

Labor unions

- International Union of Operating Engineers California Local 3
- AFL-CIO South Bay Labor Council
- Teamsters 856
- UA Local 393

Organizations

- CCSA Advocates

Individuals

- Magdalena Carrasco
- Mayra Cruz
- Kevin de León
- Betty Martinez
- Karen Martinez
- Omar Torres
Josh Barousse

Labor unions

- IFPTE Local 21
- International Union of Bricklayers and Allied Craftworkers Local 3 California
- UA Local 393

Organizations

- Dean Democratic Club of Silicon Valley
- Santa Clara County League of Conservation Voters
- Sierra Club Loma Prieta

Political party organizations

- Silicon Valley Young Democrats
Denise Belisle

Individuals

- Rose Herrera
- Chuck Reed
- Susie Wilson
Jimmy Nguyen

Organizations

- California Apartment Association Tri County Division
- Citizens for Fiscal Responsibility
- San Jose Silicon Valley Chamber of Commerce
- Santa Clara County Association of Realtors

Political party organizations

- Santa Clara County Democratic Club

Individuals

- Kansen Chu
- Jose Esteves
- Johnny Khamis
- Tam Nguyen
- Jim Zito
Pat Waite

Political party organizations

- California Republican Assembly

=== Results ===
2016 San Jose City Council 8th district election
Primary election
Candidate	Votes	%
Sylvia Arenas	4,951	23.8
Jimmy Nguyen	4,758	22.9
Denise Belisle	4,269	20.5
Pat Waite	3,435	16.5
Josh Barousse	3,390	16.3
Total votes	20,803	100.0
General election
Sylvia Arenas	17,258	50.1
Jimmy Nguyen	17,161	49.9
Total votes	34,419	100.0

== District 10 ==
Incumbent Johnny Khamis was elected to the 10th district in 2012 in the runoff with 52.6% of the vote. He was eligible for reelection.

=== Endorsements ===
Johnny Khamis

Individuals

- Sam Liccardo
- Chuck Reed

Political party organizations

- California Republican Assembly

=== Results ===
2016 San Jose City Council 10th district election
Primary election
Candidate	Votes	%
Johnny Khamis (incumbent)	15,983	76.1
J. Michael Sodergren	5,026	23.9
Total votes	21,009	100.0
