= 2024 San Jose City Council election =

Local election in California

- March 5 (primary); November 5 (runoff)

5 of 10 seats on San Jose City Council

The 2024 San Jose City Council election took place on March 5, 2024, to elect five of the ten seats of the San Jose City Council, with runoff elections taking place on November 5, 2024. Runoffs only occurred if no candidate received more than 50% of the votes cast in the contest. Local elections in California are officially nonpartisan. Each councilmember is term-limited after two consecutive terms in office.

== District 2 ==
Incumbent Sergio Jimenez was elected to the 2nd district in 2016 and 2020. He was term-limited and ineligible to run again.

=== Endorsements ===
Pamela Campos

Political party organizations

- Dean Democratic Club of Silicon Valley
- Democratic Activists for Women Now (DAWN) (runoff election)
- Democratic Municipal Officials
- Democrats at San Jose State
- Santa Clara County Democratic Party
- Silicon Valley Young Democrats
- California Young Democrats
- Working Families Party

Labor unions

- AFL-CIO South Bay Labor Council
- California Nurses Association
- IFPTE Local 21
- National Nurses United

Organizations

- Fund Her
- Gun Sense Voter
- Housing Action Coalition (HAC) (runoff election)
- Latinas Lead CA
- Planned Parenthood Advocates Mar Monte
- Run for Something
- Santa Clara County League of Conservation Voters
- South Bay Progressive Alliance
- South Bay YIMBY (runoff election)
Joe Lopez

Organizations

- Citizens for Fiscal Responsibility
- Silicon Valley Biz PAC

Labor unions

- San Jose Police Officers' Association

Newspapers

- The Mercury News/East Bay Times

Individuals

- Matt Mahan
Babu Prasad

Labor unions

- South Bay Labor Council
- Teamsters Joint Council 7
- SEIU UHW
- Sheet Metal Workers' Local 104
Vanessa Sandoval

Organizations

- Bay Area Municipal Elections Committee
- South Bay YIMBY (primary election)
- Housing Action Coalition (primary election)
- Democratic Activists for Women Now (DAWN) (primary election)

=== Results ===
2024 San Jose City Council 2nd district election
Primary election
Candidate	Votes	%
Joe Lopez	4,950	35.0
Pamela Campos	3,436	24.3
Babu Prasad	3,026	21.4
Vanessa Sandoval	2,719	19.4
Total votes	14,131	100.0
General election
Pamela Campos	16,883	54.0
Joe Lopez	14,362	46.0
Total votes	31,245	100.0

== District 4 ==
Incumbent David Cohen was elected to the 4th district in 2020 in a runoff with 51.3% of the vote. He ran for reelection.

=== Endorsements ===
David Cohen

Organizations

- Bay Area Municipal Elections Committee
- Silicon Valley Biz PAC
- South Bay YIMBY
- Housing Action Coalition (HAC)
- East Valley Democratic Club
- Democratic Activists for Women Now (DAWN) (dual endorsement)

Labor unions

- SEIU UHW
- AFL-CIO South Bay Labor Council (dual endorsement)

Newspapers

- The Mercury News/East Bay Times
Kansen Chu

Labor unions

- AFL-CIO South Bay Labor Council (dual endorsement)
- Sheet Metal Workers' Local 104

Organizations

- Democratic Activists for Women Now (DAWN) (dual endorsement)
- Hindu American PAC

=== Results ===
2024 San Jose City Council 4th district election
Primary election
Candidate	Votes	%
David Cohen (incumbent)	8,391	58.6
Kansen Chu	5,931	41.4
Total votes	14,322	100.0

== District 6 ==
Incumbent Dev Davis was elected to the 6th district in 2016 and 2020. She was term-limited and ineligible to run again.

=== Endorsements ===
Michael Mulcahy

Political party organizations

- Democrats at San Jose State

Organizations

- Bay Area Municipal Elections Committee
- Citizens for Fiscal Responsibility
- Gun Sense Voter
- Santa Clara County League of Conservation Voters
- Silicon Valley Biz PAC

Newspapers

- The Mercury News/East Bay Times

Labor unions

- San Jose Police Officers' Association
Olivia Navarro

Political party organizations

- Democratic Activists for Women Now (DAWN)
- Santa Clara County Democratic Party

Labor unions

- IFPTE Local 21
- AFL-CIO South Bay Labor Council (runoff election)
- SEIU UHW
- Teamsters Joint Council 7 (dual endorsement)
- UA Local 393
Angelo 'AJ' Pasciuti

Labor unions

- Teamsters Joint Council 7 (dual endorsement)
- Sheet Metal Workers' Local 104
- AFL-CIO South Bay Labor Council (primary election)

Organizations

- South Bay Progressive Alliance
Alex Shoor

Organizations

- South Bay YIMBY
- Housing Action Coalition (HAC)

=== Results ===
2024 San Jose City Council 6th district election
Primary election
Candidate	Votes	%
Michael Mulcahy	8,695	39.3
Olivia Navarro	6,913	31.2
Alex Shoor	3,850	17.4
Angelo 'AJ' Pasciuti	2,688	12.1
Total votes	22,146	100.0
General election
Michael Mulcahy	19,629	51.3
Olivia Navarro	18,632	48.7
Total votes	38,261	100.0

== District 8 ==
Sylvia Arenas was elected to the 8th district in 2016 and 2020. She subsequently left the seat early following her election to the Santa Clara County Board of Supervisors in 2022. Domingo Candelas was appointed to the seat in January 2023 for the remainder of Arenas' term.

=== Endorsements ===
Tam Truong

Organizations

- Citizens for Fiscal Responsibility
Domingo Candelas

Political party organizations

- Democrats at San Jose State
- Democratic Activists for Women Now (DAWN)
- Santa Clara County Democratic Party
- Silicon Valley Young Democrats
- California Young Democrats

Organizations

- Bay Area Municipal Elections Committee
- Housing Action Coalition (HAC)
- Justice Opportunity Liberty Politico (JOLPOL)
- Planned Parenthood Advocates Mar Monte
- Silicon Valley Asian Pacific American Democratic Club

Labor unions

- AFL-CIO South Bay Labor Council
- IFPTE Local 21
- San Jose Police Officers' Association
- SEIU UHW
- Sheet Metal Workers' Local 104
- Teamsters Joint Council 7

Individuals

- Jim Beall
- Bob Jonsen
Sukhdev Singh Bainiwal

Organizations

- Silicon Valley Biz PAC

Newspapers

- The Mercury News/East Bay Times

=== Results ===
2024 San Jose City Council 8th district election
Primary election
Candidate	Votes	%
Domingo Candelas (incumbent)	8,466	39.4
Tam Truong	6,982	32.5
Sukhdev Singh Bainiwal	5,513	25.7
Surinder Kaur Dhaliwal	501	2.3
Total votes	21,462	100.0
General election
Domingo Candelas (incumbent)	23,363	57.3
Tam Truong	17,432	42.7
Total votes	40,795	100.0

== District 10 ==
Matt Mahan was elected to the 8th district in 2020 in the primary with 58.5% of the vote. He left the 10th district seat early after his election to San Jose mayor in the 2022 election. Arjun Batra was appointed to the seat in January 2023 for the remainder of Mahan's term.

=== Endorsements ===
George Casey

Organizations

- Citizens for Fiscal Responsibility
- Gun Sense Voter
- Silicon Valley Biz PAC (dual endorsement)

Labor unions

- San Jose Police Officers' Association (dual endorsement)

Political party organizations

- Democrats at San Jose State

Individuals

- Matt Mahan
- Jeff Rosen
- Larry Stone
- Johnny Khamis
Arjun Bata

Newspapers

- The Mercury News/East Bay Times

Labor unions

- San Jose Police Officers' Association (dual endorsement)

Organizations

- Hindu American PAC
- Justice Opportunity Liberty Politico (JOLPOL)
- League of Conservation Voters of Santa Clara County
- Silicon Valley Biz PAC (dual endorsement)

Individuals

- Ro Khanna
- Sam Liccardo
- Madison Nguyen
Lenka Wright

Labor unions

- AFL-CIO South Bay Labor Council
- South Bay Labor Council
- SEIU UHW
- Sheet Metal Workers' Local 104
- Teamsters Joint Council 7

Organizations

- Bay Area Municipal Elections Committee
- Democratic Activists for Women Now (DAWN)

=== Results ===
2024 San Jose City Council 8th district election
Primary election
Candidate	Votes	%
George Casey	8,805	38.6
Arjun Bata (incumbent)	8,354	36.6
Lenka Wright	5,640	24.7
Total votes	22,799	100.0
General election
George Casey	23,977	57.8
Arjun Bata (incumbent)	17,507	42.2
Total votes	41,484	100.0
