= 2008 San Jose City Council election =

Local election in California

- June 3 (primary); November 4 (runoff)

5 of 10 seats on San Jose City Council

The 2008 San Jose City Council election took place on June 3, 2008, to elect five of the ten seats of the San Jose City Council, with runoff elections taking place on November 4, 2008. Runoffs only occurred if no candidate received more than 50% of the votes cast in the contest. Local elections in California are officially nonpartisan. Each councilmember is term-limited after two consecutive terms in office.

== District 2 ==
Incumbent Forrest Williams was elected to the 2nd district in 2000 and 2004. He was ineligible for reelection.

=== Endorsements ===
Ash Kalra

Organizations

- Santa Clara County League of Conservation Voters

=== Results ===
2008 San Jose City Council 2nd district election
Primary election
Candidate	Votes	%
Ash Kalra	4,764	42.2
Jacquelyn "Jackie" Adams	2,095	18.6
Ram Singh	2,083	18.5
Ted Scarlett	896	7.9
Nicholas J. Rice-Sanchez	800	7.1
Bui Thang	648	5.7
Total votes	11,286	100.0
General election
Ash Kalra	15,639	54.4
Jacquelyn "Jackie" Adams	13,095	45.6
Total votes	28,734	100.0

== District 4 ==
Incumbent Kansen Chu was elected to the 4th district in 2007 in the special election runoff with 64.7% of the vote. He was eligible for reelection.

=== Results ===
2008 San Jose City Council 4th district election
Primary election
Candidate	Votes	%
Kansen Chu (incumbent)	10,590	100.0
Total votes	10,590	100.0

== District 6 ==
Incumbent Pierluigi Oliverio was elected to the 6th district in 2007 in the special election primary with 58.2% of the vote. He was eligible for reelection.

=== Results ===
2008 San Jose City Council 6th district election
Primary election
Candidate	Votes	%
Pierluigi Oliverio (incumbent)	10,866	100.0
Total votes	10,866	100.0

== District 8 ==
Incumbent Dave Cortese was elected to the 8th district in 2000 and 2004. He was ineligible for reelection.

=== Endorsements ===
Rose Herrera

Organizations

- Santa Clara County League of Conservation Voters

=== Results ===
2008 San Jose City Council 8th district election
Primary election
Candidate	Votes	%
Rose Herrera	3,313	23.3
Pat Waite	2,954	20.8
Craig Mann	1,998	14.0
Minh Duong	1,784	12.5
Lan Nguyen	1,457	10.2
Sylvia Alvarez	1,437	10.1
Van Le	1,003	7.1
Galvin D. Jackson	276	1.9
Total votes	14,222	100.0
General election
Rose Herrera	17,383	51.9
Pat Waite	16,125	48.1
Total votes	33,508	100.0

== District 10 ==
Incumbent Nancy Pyle was elected to the 10th district in 2004 in the runoff with 50.6% of the vote. She was eligible for reelection.

=== Results ===
2008 San Jose City Council 10th district election
Primary election
Candidate	Votes	%
Nancy Pyle (incumbent)	11,402	89.4
Ashraf M.	1,355	10.6
Total votes	12,757	100.0
