= 2014 San Jose mayoral election =

- June 3, 2014 (first round); November 4, 2014 (runoff)
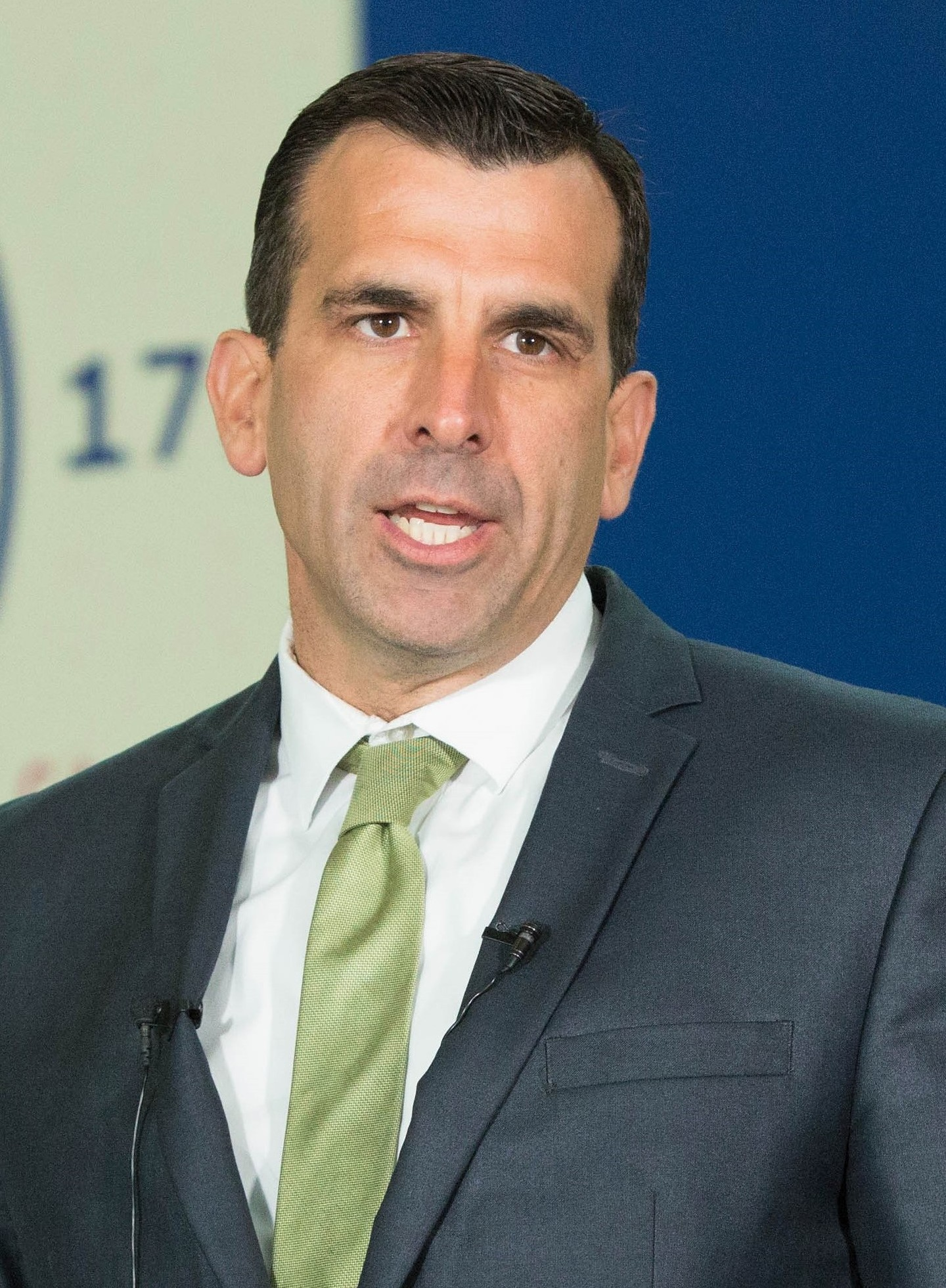

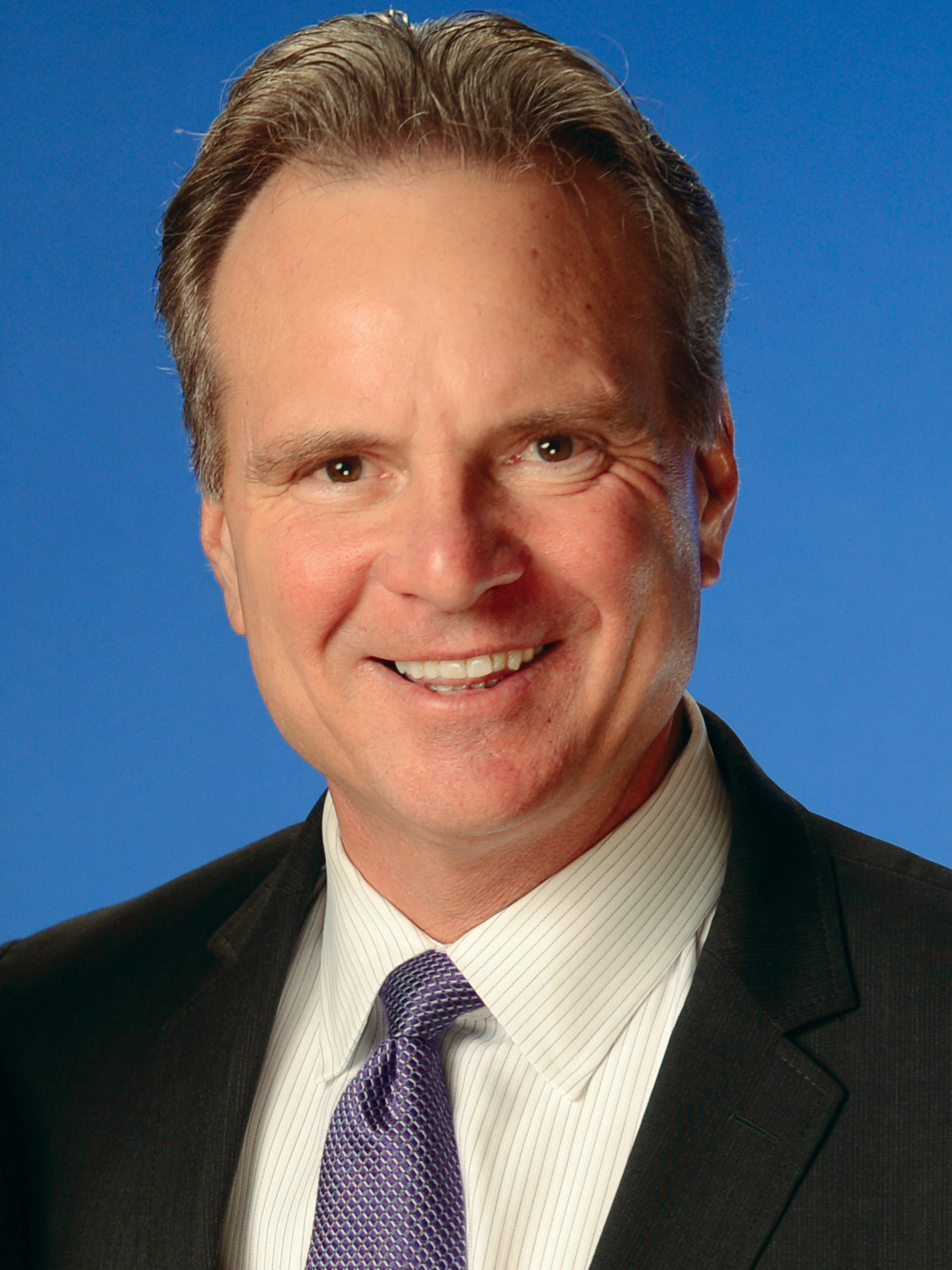

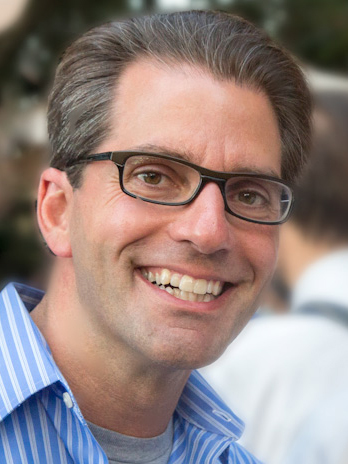

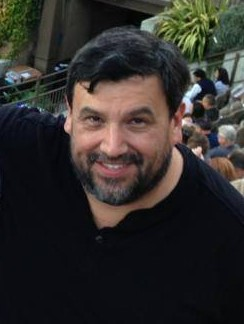
Candidate	Sam Liccardo	Dave Cortese	Madison Nguyen
First round	33,521; 25.75%	43,887; 33.72%	26,365; 20.26%
Second round	91,840; 50.76%	89,090; 49.24%	Eliminated
Candidate	Pierluigi Oliverio	Rose Herrera	Michael Alvarado
First round	13,197; 10.14%	7,950; 6.11%	1,959; 1.51%
Second round	Eliminated	Eliminated	Eliminated
Mayor before election
Chuck Reed
Elected mayor
Sam Liccardo

The 2014 San Jose mayoral election was held on June 3, 2014, to elect the Mayor of San Jose, California. Councilmember Sam Liccardo defeated Santa Clara County Supervisor Dave Cortese in a runoff on November 4, 2014.

Incumbent Democratic Mayor Chuck Reed was term limited and could not run for re-election to a third consecutive term in office.

The election was nonpartisan per California state law, although most of the candidates chose to state a political party affiliation. A primary election was held on June 3, 2014. As no candidate received a majority of the vote, a runoff election was held between the top two vote-getters, Dave Cortese and Sam Liccardo, on November 4, 2014. Liccardo was elected mayor with a majority of the vote.

Municipal elections in California are officially non-partisan.

== Candidates ==
=== Declared ===
- Michael Alvarado, community activist
- Bill Chew, perennial candidate
- Dave Cortese, Santa Clara County Supervisor, former San Jose City Councilman and candidate for Mayor in 2006
- Timothy Harrison
- Rose Herrera, San Jose City Councilwoman
- Sam Liccardo, San Jose City Councilman
- Madison Nguyen, San Jose City Councilwoman and Vice Mayor of San Jose
- Pierluigi Oliverio, San Jose City Councilman
- Mark Pham
- Tyrone Wade

=== Withdrew ===
- Pete Constant, San Jose City Councilman
- Andrew Abe Diaz, perennial candidate
- Louis Garza
- Susan Marsland (running for San Jose City Council)
- Larry Rouse
- David Wall, candidate for Santa Clara County Supervisor in 2013 and for San Jose City Council in 1998
- David Warner, candidate for San Jose City Council in 2004

=== Declined ===
- Pat Waite, businessman and candidate for San Jose City Council in 2008
- Forrest Williams, former San Jose City Councilman and candidate for Santa Clara County Supervisor in 2010

== Primary election ==
The primary election saw a total of ten candidates on the ballot, including Dave Cortese, a Santa Clara County Supervisor and former San Jose City Councilmember, as well as four sitting San Jose City Councilmembers: Vice Mayor Madison Nguyen, Sam Liccardo, Pierluigi Oliverio, and Rose Herrera.

The political climate of the race was influenced by an ongoing dispute between representatives of the city's labor force and Mayor Chuck Reed, stemming from a 2012 ballot initiative championed by Reed to restructure San Jose City employee pensions. Dave Cortese received the full endorsement and support of the politically powerful South Bay Labor Council, while the four sitting councilmembers, having supported Mayor Reed's pension reform initiative, were described as "Reed loyalists." This ideological polarization was present not just in San Jose's mayoral election, but in a number of City Council races as well.

As part of his campaign, Councilmember Liccardo authored a book in which he assessed the issues facing San Jose and offered his own vision for the city. On May 2, the editorial board of the San Jose Mercury News endorsed Liccardo for mayor, citing the book as well as his record on the council.

=== Polling ===
Poll source	Date(s) administered	Sample size	Margin of error	Michael Alvarado	Bill Chew	Dave Cortese	Timothy Harrison	Rose Herrera	Sam Liccardo	Madison Nguyen	Pierluigi Oliverio	Other	Undecided
SurveyUSA	May 15–21, 2014	461	± 4.7%	3%	3%	26%	1%	7%	20%	11%	8%	—	22%

=== Results ===
Mayoral primary results, June 3, 2014
Candidate	Votes	%
Dave Cortese	43,887	33.72
Sam Liccardo	33,521	25.75
Madison Nguyen	26,365	20.26
Pierluigi Oliverio	13,197	10.14
Rose Herrera	7,950	6.11
Mike Alvarado	1,959	1.51
Timothy Harrison	1,715	1.32
Bill Chew	1,563	1.20
Total votes	130,157	100.00

== Runoff election ==
=== Polling ===
Poll source	Date(s) administered	Sample size	Margin of error	Dave Cortese	Sam Liccardo	Undecided
SurveyUSA	October 20–23, 2014	540	± 4.3%	44%	38%	19%
San Jose State University	October 12–16, 2014	571	± 4.1%	34%	26%	40%

=== Results ===
Mayoral election results, November 4, 2014
Candidate	Votes	%
Sam Liccardo	91,840	50.76
Dave Cortese	89,090	49.24
Total votes	180,930	100.00
