= 2000 San Jose City Council election =

Local election in California

- March 7 (primary); November 7 (runoff)

5 of 10 seats on San Jose City Council

The 2000 San Jose City Council election took place on March 7, 2000, to elect five of the ten seats of the San Jose City Council, with runoff elections taking place on November 7, 2000. Runoffs only occurred if no candidate received more than 50% of the votes cast in the contest. Local elections in California are officially nonpartisan. Each councilmember is term-limited after two consecutive terms in office.

== District 2 ==
Incumbent Charlotte Powers was elected to the 2nd district in 1992 and 1996. She was ineligible to run for reelection.

=== Results ===
2000 San Jose City Council 2nd district election
Primary election
Candidate	Votes	%
Forrest Williams	8,142	48.6
Kathy Chavez Napoli	5,521	32.9
Maria Y. Ferrer	3,102	18.5
Total votes	16,765	100.0
General election
Forrest Williams	14,084	55.9
Kathy Chavez Napoli	11,094	44.1
Total votes	25,178	100.0

== District 4 ==
Incumbent Margie Fernandes was elected to the 4th district in 1992 and 1996. She was ineligible to run for reelection.

=== Results ===
2000 San Jose City Council 4th district election
Primary election
Candidate	Votes	%
Chuck Reed	6,098	42.7
Kansen Chu	3,898	27.3
J. Manuel Herrera	1,597	11.2
George Melendez	1,233	8.6
Dale Detwiler	983	6.9
Jim Canova	475	3.3
Total votes	14,284	100.0
General election
Chuck Reed	13,674	60.0
Kansen Chu	9,098	40.0
Total votes	22,772	100.0

== District 6 ==
Incumbent Frank Fiscalini was elected to the 6th district in 1992 and 1996. He was ineligible to run for reelection.

=== Results ===
2000 San Jose City Council 6th district election
Primary election
Candidate	Votes	%
Ken Yeager	7,292	38.6
Kris Cunningham	6,202	32.8
Jim Spence	3,210	17.0
Mike Borquez	824	4.4
Bill Chew	785	4.2
Dan Lopez	582	3.1
Total votes	18,895	100.0
General election
Ken Yeager	14,647	53.8
Kris Cunningham	12,597	46.2
Total votes	27,244	100.0

== District 8 ==
Incumbent Alice Woody was elected to the 8th district in 1996 in the primary with 60.7% of the vote. She was eligible to run for reelection, but chose not to run.

=== Results ===
2000 San Jose City Council 8th district election
Primary election
Candidate	Votes	%
Dave Cortese	7,658	45.8
Eddie Garcia	3,843	23.0
Maria Fuentes	2,736	16.4
Patricia Martinez-Roach	2,472	14.8
Total votes	16,709	100.0
General election
Dave Cortese	17,083	64.2
Eddie Garcia	9,507	35.8
Total votes	26,590	100.0

== District 10 ==
Incumbent Pat Dando was initially elected to the 10th district in a special election runoff in 1995, and was subsequently reelected in 1996. She was eligible to run for reelection.

=== Results ===
2000 San Jose City Council 10th district election
Primary election
Candidate	Votes	%
Pat Dando (incumbent)	15,644	72.4
Nancy Pyle	5,118	23.7
William J. Garbett	856	4.0
Total votes	21,618	100.0
