= 2004 San Jose City Council election =

Local election in California

- March 2 (primary); November 2 (runoff)

5 of 10 seats on San Jose City Council

The 2004 San Jose City Council election took place on March 2, 2004, to elect five of the ten seats of the San Jose City Council, with runoff elections taking place on November 2, 2004. Runoffs only occurred if no candidate received more than 50% of the votes cast in the contest. Local elections in California are officially nonpartisan. Each councilmember is term-limited after two consecutive terms in office.

== District 2 ==
Incumbent Forrest Williams was elected to the 2nd district in 2000 in the runoff with 55.9% of the vote. He was eligible for reelection.

=== Endorsements ===
Forrest Williams

Organizations

- Santa Clara County League of Conservation Voters

=== Results ===
2004 San Jose City Council 2nd district election
Primary election
Candidate	Votes	%
Forrest Williams (incumbent)	9,421	70.8
Ted Scarlett	3,894	29.2
Total votes	13,315	100.0

== District 4 ==
Incumbent Chuck Reed was elected to the 4th district in 2000 in the runoff with 60.0% of the vote. He was eligible for reelection.

=== Endorsements ===
Chuck Reed

Organizations

- Santa Clara County League of Conservation Voters

=== Results ===
2004 San Jose City Council 4th district election
Primary election
Candidate	Votes	%
Chuck Reed (incumbent)	10,224	86.1
Dale Warner	1,649	13.9
Total votes	11,873	100.0

== District 6 ==
Incumbent Ken Yeager was elected to the 6th district in 2000 in the runoff with 53.8% of the vote. He was eligible for reelection.

=== Endorsements ===
Ken Yeager

Organizations

- Santa Clara County League of Conservation Voters

=== Results ===
2004 San Jose City Council 6th district election
Primary election
Candidate	Votes	%
Ken Yeager (incumbent)	14,880	85.6
Daniel L. Beasworrick	2,495	14.4
Total votes	17,375	100.0

== District 8 ==
Incumbent Dave Cortese was elected to the 6th district in 2000 in the runoff with 64.2% of the vote. He was eligible for reelection.

=== Results ===
2004 San Jose City Council 8th district election
Primary election
Candidate	Votes	%
Dave Cortese (incumbent)	12,855	100.0
Total votes	12,855	100.0

== District 10 ==
Incumbent Pat Dando was initially elected to the 10th district in a special election runoff in 1995, and was subsequently reelected in 1996 and 2000. She was ineligible for reelection.

=== Endorsements ===
Nancy Pyle

Organizations

- Santa Clara County League of Conservation Voters
Rich De La Rosa

Individuals

- Jim Cunneen
- Pat Dando
- Tom McEnery
- Don Gage

Newspapers

- The Mercury News

=== Results ===
2004 San Jose City Council 10th district election
Primary election
Candidate	Votes	%
Rich De La Rosa	8,327	48.6
Nancy Pyle	6,207	36.2
Ronald Siporen	1,687	9.8
William J. Garbett	913	5.3
Total votes	17,134	100.0
General election
Nancy Pyle	16,339	50.6
Rich De La Rosa	15,925	49.4
Total votes	32,264	100.0
