= California Racial Justice Act of 2020 =

American criminal law statute

The California Racial Justice Act of 2020 (AB 2542) bars the state from seeking or securing a criminal conviction or imposing a sentence on the basis of race, ethnicity or national origin. The Act, in part, allows a person to challenge their criminal case if there are statistical disparities in how people of different races are either charged, convicted or sentenced of crimes. The Act counters the effect of the widely criticized 1987 Supreme Court decision in McClesky v. Kemp, which rejected the use of statistical disparities in the application of the death penalty to prove the kind of intentional discrimination required for a constitutional violation. The Act, however, goes beyond countering McClesky to also allow a defendant to challenge their charge, conviction or sentence if a judge, attorney, law enforcement officer, expert witness, or juror exhibited bias or animus towards the defendant because of their race, ethnicity, or national origin or if one of those same actors used racially discriminatory language during the trial. The CRJA only applies prospectively to cases sentenced after January 1, 2021. The Act is codified in Sections 745, 1473 and 1473.7 of the California Penal Code.

The CRJA reflects and is part of a growing movement to address racial injustice in the criminal legal system, including police brutality, disparate charging practices, and mass incarceration, particularly in the wake of the murder of George Floyd. The Act was part of a trio of major criminal justice reforms that were passed in the last few days of the 2019-2020 legislative session, despite certain limitations imposed by the COVID-19 pandemic. The other two reforms included AB 3070 (a jury selection reform requiring clear and convincing evidence that a preemptory strike was not related to a protected class) and AB 2512 (amending the death penalty disability statute to prevent anyone who satisfies the scientific definition of intellectual disability to be eligible for the death penalty). Of the three, the CRJA is considered to be the most expansive. However, given its recent enactment, few defendants have brought claims and little is known about how robustly courts will interpret it.

== Background and Legislative History ==
Assemblymember Ash Kalra (a Democrat representing the 27th Assembly District and a former Santa Clara County deputy public defender) proposed the Racial Justice Act to counter racial injustice in the criminal legal system. Specifically, the CRJA acts as a "countermeasure" to the 1987 Supreme Court decision McClesky v. Kemp, which set an "unreasonably high standard for victims of racism in the criminal legal system." In McClesky, the Supreme Court held that absent more direct proof of discriminatory intent, statistical disparities alone did not amount to a constitutional violation. McClesky effectively limited federal courts' ability to address systemic discrimination and left them only able to deal with egregious examples of intentional racism. In proposing the bill, Kalra was particularly concerned with the "unintentional systemic biases that are even more pervasive and damaging" than instances of outright racial hatred or bias. "It's impossible to ignore the racial disparities that exists [sic] when you look at those that are prosecuted and those that are sent away to prison." The Act's legislative history also makes clear that it does not require violations to have been either purposeful or to have caused the defendant prejudicial harm. According to Kalra, the COVID-19 pandemic made the CRJA more necessary than ever before.

Kalra's bill was initially meant to apply to all California criminal cases. The legislative history outlines the fiscal implications of the original version of Kalra's bill. The Senate Appropriations Committee estimated that courts should anticipate a $9.3 to $40.6 million increase in costs for a bill with both prospective and retroactive application. That same analysis estimated that of the 10.2 million criminal cases handled between 2009 and 2018 in California, if just 1% of claimants filed writs there would be 100,000 habeas petitions.

Though the initial version of the bill passed the Assembly by a vote of 76-0 on June 8, 2020, it was subsequently amended by the Senate Appropriations Committee on August 20, 2020 to apply prospectively to cases in which judgment had not yet been entered before January 1, 2021. Additional amendments by Kalra added the language of "similarly situated" to the comparative analysis, required a defense motion for discovery with a showing of good cause, allowed a reviewing court to modify the sentence, extended the CRJA to apply to juveniles, raised the standard to succeed on an initial motion for a hearing and clarified that a petition for habeas is only available following a conviction. Even a bill with future effect would lead to an increase in court administration costs in the low millions of dollars. The fiscal impact on the prison system would be more indeterminate. According to a Senate Committee analysis, a prospective-only Racial Justice Act would produce marginal cost savings for the California Department of Corrections and Rehabilitation (CDCR) by sending fewer people to jail. Only if the prison population was reduced sufficiently to close a yard or a wing of a prison would CDCR experience more meaningful institutional savings.

Additional amendments on the Senate Floor on August 25, 2020 added a severability provision and altered the sections of the bill regarding discriminatory language at trial, requests for records, appointment of counsel, and available remedies. A week later, on August 31, 2020, the Senate passed the amended bill by a vote of 26-10, followed by the Assembly with a vote of 49-16. Governor Gavin Newsom signed the bill into law on September 30, 2020. In a signing statement published by the Governor's Office, Newsom described McClesky as "almost impossible to meet without direct proof that the racially discriminatory behavior was conscious, deliberate and targeted."

In 2020, only 372 new laws were signed by the Governor and enacted in California, the lowest number since 1967. Generally, most of the laws were passed in response to traumatic events of 2020, including the devastation of the pandemic, the record-setting California wildfires, and ongoing racial terrorism. Also in the 2019-2020 legislative session, Assemblymember Marc Levine had proposed a Racial Justice Act that would have applied only to capital cases where race was a significant factor in the seeking or imposition of the death penalty. The bill died in the Assembly Committee on Appropriations.

== Provisions ==
For a more detailed discussion and analysis of the Act's three operative provisions, see Sentencing California Crimes § 28.

=== Section 1: Title ===
The Act is to be titled the California Racial Justice Act of 2020.

=== Section 2: Legislative Findings ===
In its findings, the legislature discusses the harm caused by both explicit and implicit racism, the pervasiveness of bias in the criminal legal system, the failure of current legal precedents to address such bias, the high bar set by federal law requiring a showing of purposeful discrimination, and the refusal of McClesky to recognize pervasive statistical disparities.

=== Section 3: Adding Penal Code § 745 [Inoperative] ===
This section is completely inoperative and claimants should not rely on this section. Section 3 and Section 3.5 are nearly identical, except that the former also included protections against bias in jury selection. Because there was another pending bill (AB 3070) in the same 2019-2020 legislative session that would exclusively address racial discrimination in jury selection, the legislature drafted two versions of § 745 contingent on whether AB 3070 became law. Because AB 3070 did in fact come to be enacted and became effective on January 1, 2021, Section 3.5 prevailed, as provided by Section 7 of AB 2542 (see below).

=== Section 3.5: Adding Penal Code § 745 [Operative] ===
For cases in which judgment has not been entered before January 1, 2021, the newly added Penal Code § 745 forbids the state from engaging in five kinds of racial discrimination. Upon making a prima facie case of one of the violations listed in § 745(a), a defendant is entitled to a hearing. The defendant must ultimately prove that a violation occurred by a preponderance of the evidence. The prosecution can offer race-neutral justifications, which will be a question of fact for the judge to decide. The CRJA does apply to juvenile cases. Proceedings regarding probation violations and, in some situations, cases that have been adjudicated by plea bargain might also be included.

- § 745(a)(1): Prohibits racial bias or animus exhibited toward the defendant by an attorney, judge, law enforcement officer, expert witness or juror involved in the case because of the defendant's race, ethnicity, or national origin.

This category includes conduct at any stage of the criminal proceeding, even before trial and after sentencing. Plaintiffs must prove three elements: that there was 1) bias or animus 2) by a designated person 3) exhibited towards the defendant. Alternate jurors would probably be included as "jurors", but probably not prospective jurors who haven't been sworn in.

- § 745(a)(2): Prohibits racially discriminatory language (or otherwise exhibiting bias or animus towards the defendant because of the defendant's race, ethnicity, or national origin) during the trial, in court or during the proceedings by a judge, law enforcement officer, expert witness, or juror, regardless of whether it was purposeful.

The type of violation listed here also requires three elements: that it was 1) by a designated person (including jurors as described above) 2) during open court 3) with proof of either racially discriminatory language that was not necessarily directed toward the defendant or any other form of bias that was directed toward the defendant. The discriminatory language or bias does not need to have been purposeful. In other words, the subjective intent of the speaker is irrelevant. Actions or words outside of the courtroom would not qualify under this type of violation but might under the next category listed at § 745(a)(3).

- § 745(a)(3): Statistical disparities in charging or convicting the defendant of a more serious offense than people of other races who commit similar offenses and are similarly situated along with evidence that the prosecution more frequently sought or obtained convictions for more serious offenses against people of the defendant's race in that county.

This violation deals with district attorneys disproportionately charging people of different races. Two requirements are needed here: 1) that defendants compare their experience with those of other "similarly situated" defendants and 2) evidence that the particular district attorney's office "more frequently sought or obtained convictions for more serious offenses against people who share the defendant's race, ethnicity, or national origin."

Note that the statute does not define "similarly situated", but it likely involves a comparison between the defendant's criminal record and the specific facts of the crime at issue with that of people of other races. "More frequently imposed" is defined in the statute as "statistical evidence or aggregate data that demonstrate a significant difference in seeking or obtaining convictions or in imposing sentences comparing individuals who have committed similar offenses and are similarly situated, and the prosecution cannot establish race-neutral reasons for the disparity." In other words, claimants must identify defendants of other races in comparable cases and must establish a significant difference in the prosecutor office's seeking or obtaining harsher penalties for people of one race than comparable cases of defendants of a different race.

- § 745(a)(4)(A): Statistical disparities in sentencing where the defendant received a longer or more severe sentence than similarly situated individuals convicted of the same offense and longer or more severe sentences were more frequently imposed for that offense on that race than defendants of other races in that county.
- § 745(a)(4)(B): Statistical disparities in sentencing where the defendant received a longer or more severe sentence than similarly situated individuals convicted of the same offense and longer or more severe sentences were more frequently imposed for the same offense on defendants in cases with victims of one race than in cases with victims of other races in that county.

The two violations listed under § 745(a)(4) address disparate sentencing practices by judges within the same county. Presumably, as for § 745(a)(3), the court would evaluate the claim by comparing the criminal record, sentence, and circumstances of similarly situated defendants and by reviewing county-level data for everyone sentenced to that particular crime. However, it is unclear how far back in time the data should (or could) go.

The definitions for "similarly situated" and "more frequently imposed" are the same as in §745(a)(3) above.

==== Discovery Procedures and Remedies ====
The Act does allow for the discovery of some non-privileged materials held by the prosecution that is triggered by a claimant's motion describing the types of records sought. The prosecution can, upon a showing of good cause, be allowed to redact the documents first. AB 2542's discovery provisions do not provide for a Brady-like affirmative obligation for the prosecution to disclose what they have.

If the claimant proves their claim by a preponderance of the evidence, the court must impose one of the remedies listed in § 745(e). The specific remedy would likely depend on the facts of the violation and when the court adjudicated the claim in relation to the posture of the case. Different remedies exist depending on whether or not judgment has been issued in the case. Pre-judgment remedies include declaring a mistrial (if the defendant so requests), discharging the jury panel, dismissing enhancements, special circumstances, and special allegations, or reducing charges. Post-judgment remedies include vacating the conviction or sentence and ordering new proceedings, or alternatively, vacating the sentence and imposing a new one that is not longer than the one just vacated. Though the exact remedy in any given case is at the discretion of the judge, a court-issued remedy is mandatory if a violation is found. If challenged by the state, the court's remedy would likely be reviewed for "abuse of discretion".

The Act also prevents anyone from being punished with the death penalty if there has been a violation of the CRJA. However, this prohibition might legally conflict with California voter initiatives establishing the death penalty.

=== Section 4: Amending Penal Code § 1473 (Habeas) ===
The Act adds racial discrimination (as defined by § 745(a)) to the claims that a defendant can make in a habeas petition pursuant to Penal Code § 1473. Other than the fact that the statute does provide for the appointment of counsel for certain indigent clients, the basic procedures (contained in § 1473, et seq., and California Rules of Court, rules 4.545 to 4.552) for pursuing a habeas petition remain unchanged.

If the claim were to succeed, the statute does not specifically mandate a remedy. Depending on the procedural posture of the case, either a new trial or a resentencing would likely be appropriate.

=== Section 5: Amending Penal Code § 1473.7 (Vacatur) ===
Violations of the Racial Justice Act are also included as a basis for vacatur pursuant to Penal Code § 1473.7. The proceedings would operate in the same manner as any other petition for vacatur provided for under § 1473.7. The remedy would likely match the violation: if the conviction was tainted by racial discrimination, the conviction should be vacated; if the sentence is tainted, the sentenced should be vacated.

=== Section 6: Severability Clause ===
This section contains a standard severability provision, establishing that if any part of the Act is found to be invalid, the rest of the provisions independent from the part in question should stand.

=== Section 7: Operability of Section 3.5 ===
Section 7 outlines the condition for when Section 3.5 of AB 2542 is to become operative, thereby replacing Section 3. Since AB 3070 did become effective on January 1, 2021, Section 3 is entirely inoperative (see above).

=== A Note on Retroactivity ===
AB 2542 contains an express savings clause stating that the legislature did not intend for it to apply retroactively. Such an express indication of prospectivity thereby overcomes the Estrada presumption that statutes which reduce punishment are ordinarily retroactive. However, the statement of intent contained in Section 2(g) of AB 2542 states that racial disparities will not be tolerated "both prospectively and retroactively". Given the unambiguous prospective application contained in the statute itself, any contrary legislative intent contained in Section 2(g) is inapposite.

As to the other operative provisions, the first sentence of § 1473(f) is very clear that a habeas claim alleging racial discrimination under the CRJA would also only apply to cases sentenced after January 1, 2021. Penal Code § 1473.7 also applies only prospectively by incorporating § 745 and its January 1, 2021 date contained therein.

Therefore, the legislative intent is clear that all the operative provisions of the CRJA would run prospectively.

== Impact and Commentary ==
As with many criminal justice issues, the Racial Justice Act has both supporters and critics. For a list of all the sponsors and opponents of the bill, please see the bill analysis from the Senate Floor dated August 26, 2020.

=== Support ===
The Act has been championed by civil rights groups and criminal justice reform advocates in both California and at the national level. AB 2542 has been called a "template and inspiration for other legislation." However, there has been little litigation pursuant to the CRJA and therefore courts have had few opportunities to interpret its provisions. How impactful and effective the CRJA will prove to be depends both on how many defendants bring claims and how aggressively the courts enforce it. Because it has statutory protection, courts might have less authority to narrow its scope than they do when assessing judicially created remedies, such as the exclusionary rule of the Fourth Amendment for instance.

Progressive prosecutors in California were largely silent on the bill one way or the other.

=== Opposition ===
According to the American Bar Association, the main concern regarding AB 2542 was that it would overwhelm the courts and cause further delays in the adjudication of criminal cases.

The California District Attorneys Association (CDAA) and the California State Sheriff's Association opposed the passage of the CRJA. The CDAA's opposition warned about the already-burdened courts having to "hold lengthy and costly evidentiary hearings" and sift through "massive amounts of statistic evidence" to adjudicate CRJA claims. They also opposed the initial draft of the bill which would have applied to all criminal cases in California, because "[p]ractically every single conviction that has ever occurred in California can now be re-opened and potentially reversed." Lastly, the CDAA also criticized the fact that a petitioner does not have to make any showing of prejudice in order to motion the court for relief.

Though they did not officially oppose the bill, the California Judges Association voiced their concerns that AB 2542 would upset the delicate balance that current law had achieved between making judgments final and preserving the rights of defendants, particularly because the original version of the bill had not required a prima facie showing to obtain an evidentiary hearing.

=== Academic Commentary ===
The CRJA aims to provide more meaningful relief for people who have experienced racism in the criminal justice system. In theory, if claimants rely on its protections, it will offer more meaningful and practical relief for both systemic racism and incidents of bias by non-state actors than does the Constitution under the Fourth or Fourteenth Amendments, statutory regimes like 42 U.S.C. § 1983, or municipal accountability mechanisms like internal police reporting. Though largely ignored by both supporters and critics, the Act provides a novel approach to addressing police racism. Both § 745(a)(1) and § 745(a)(2) include racist statements and conduct by police officers among their prohibitions.

The CRJA has been compared to the exclusionary rule of the Fourth Amendment, which prohibits particular pieces of evidence from being used in a criminal trial if they are the product of a constitutional violation. The CRJA has been called a "super-exclusionary" rule because if a violation is proven, it affords much greater relief than its Fourth Amendment counterpart. Its impact as compared to the Fourth Amendment context stems from the fact that a CRJA violation does not merely exclude any particular piece of evidence but implicates the integrity of the entire case and relatedly, that the remedy can involve charging or sentencing relief, rather than only a re-trial. Unlike the Fourth Amendment's exclusionary rule, the CRJA does not require a showing of prejudicial error. In other words, it does not matter if the alleged violation did not alter the outcome of the case.

Increasing transparency around prosecutors' charging practices and judges' sentencing patterns remains a concern. The Act's discovery provisions are not affirmative Brady-like obligations to turn over relevant exculpatory or impeachable information to the defense. Nor does the Act contain any requirement that counties publish or even collect charging, conviction, or sentencing data. As exhibited by the experience of advocates in Kentucky who have remarked on the difficulty in obtaining the data necessary to litigate their Racial Justice Act, a stronger CRJA would require that prosecutor's offices and even courts proactively collect and publish county-level data. One law review article has recommended the development of "county-level, single-prosecutor statistical studies and historical records of discrimination."

== Litigation ==
Since the CRJA is relatively new, there is little case law on the subject as of May 2022 and little is known about how effective it will prove to be. The few cases that do leverage the CRJA are listed below in chronological order:

1. In People v. Jackson, No. B311740, 2021 WL 4144983 (Cal. Ct. App. Sept. 13, 2021), petitioner Jackson sought relief under AB 2542 and was denied. The CRJA does not apply to his 1997 conviction.
2. In Flores v. Superior Ct., No. S270692, 2021 Cal. LEXIS 7827 (Nov. 10, 2021), denying petition for review to No. G060445 (Cal. Ct. App. Aug. 26, 2021), the California Supreme Court turned down the opportunity to review the Court of Appeal's decision in this case, which had narrowly construed CRJA's discovery provisions.
3. In Wynn v. Foulk, No. 20-CV-00181-SI, 2021 WL 6135325 (N.D. Cal. Dec. 29, 2021), the United States District Court for the Northern District of California denied a federal habeas petition under 28 U.S.C §2254 because, according to the Antiterrorism and Effective Death Penalty Act of 1996, a federal court does not have the authority to review a claim arising under state statutes (such as the CRJA) unless the state court's decision "(1) resulted in a decision that was contrary to, or involved an unreasonable application of, clearly established Federal law, as determined by the Supreme Court of the United States; or (2) resulted in a decision that was based on an unreasonable determination of the facts in light of the evidence presented in the state court proceeding." Mr. Wynn was sentenced on August 11, 2016, thereby making him ineligible for relief under AB 2542.
4. In Harris v. Cisneros, No. 22-CV-00074-CRB (PR), 2022 WL 1082015 (N.D. Cal. Apr. 11, 2022), the United States District Court for the Northern District of California denied a petition for a writ of habeas corpus pursuant to § 745 from a 1988 sentence. The Contra Costa County Superior Court had previously denied the petitioner's claim because he had provided only "conclusory statements regarding the presence or absence of physical evidence involved in the case" which do not "create an inference that someone involved in investigating or trying his case were motivated by racial animus." Neither do the petitioner's claims, the Superior Court reasoned, provide a statistical basis to challenge either the initial charges or the sentence imposed. The Northern District of California concluded that, because the CRJA does not apply to cases in which judgment was entered prior to January 1, 2021, petitioner cannot claim that the Superior Court's denial of his petition violated his federal rights. Accord Wynn v. Foulk, No. 20-cv-0181-SI, 2021 WL 6135325, at *4 (N.D. Cal. Dec. 29, 2021) (finding claim for relief under the CRJA not cognizable in federal habeas law under § 2254).

== Ambiguities and Proposed Amendments ==
=== Statutory Ambiguities ===
One legal treatise has identified a number of ambiguities in the procedural and remedial dictates of the CRJA. Only a few are listed here:

- It is unclear who hears a CRJA motion. If the default is to have the trial judge hear all matters, what happens when the accusation is leveled against the trial judge himself? AB 2542 does not provide any guidance.
- What form should statistical data disclosed pursuant to discovery take? While the state is not obligated to collect, synthesize and publish data, it is unclear what exactly would be shared with defense counsel and how.
- While a remedy is required by the CRJA, it is uncertain whether such a remedy depends on when the violation occurred or when it was adjudicated. This legal treatise suggests it probably depends on the latter.
- According to § 745(e)(2)(A), if "the court has the ability to rectify the violation by modifying the judgment," the court is required to "vacate the conviction and sentence, find that the conviction is legally invalid, and modify the judgment to impose an appropriate remedy for the violation that occurred." What constitutes an "ability to rectify" is undefined. Moreover, how is the court meant to "modify the judgement" if it has already vacated the conviction at issue? There's no indication from the text alone that the court should grant a new trial. Courts might put more weight on the statutory directive to modify and impose an "appropriate remedy" rather than the instruction to vacate.

=== Racial Justice Act for All ===
In 2021, Assemblymember Kalra authored the Racial Justice Act for All to amend the original CRJA to have retroactive effect as he originally intended. The Racial Justice Act for All was amended by the Assembly on May 24, 2021 to create a phased-in approach to retroactivity.

1. Starting on January 1, 2022, the CRJA would apply retroactively to cases sentenced before January 1, 2021, if the defendant is a) sentenced to death, b) currently serving a state prison sentence or a felony sentence in the county jail under realignment, or c) has filed a motion to vacate due to adverse immigration consequences stemming from the criminal case at issue.
2. Starting on January 1, 2023, the CRJA would apply retroactively to felony or juvenile cases sentenced after January 1, 2013.
3. Starting on January 1, 2025, the CRJA would apply retroactively to all felony or juvenile cases, regardless of the date of judgment.
4. This phased-in timeline would also govern habeas petitions alleging violations of the CRJA.

The Assembly simultaneously amended the Racial Justice Act for All to clarify certain statutory ambiguities that had since been identified in the original CRJA (see above).

1. Delete the provision in § 745(e)(2)(A) that requires the court to "modify the judgment to impose an appropriate remedy," leaving unaltered the remedy mandating that the judge vacate the conviction and sentence and initiate new proceedings.
2. Establish that if it is alleged that the judge has, in whole or in part, violated the CRJA, the judge should disqualify themselves from adjudicating the violation.
3. Clarify that "juror" means prospective or sworn jurors, as well as alternate jurors.

The Assembly passed the measure by a vote of 45-21 on June 1, 2021. The Senate Committee on Appropriations moved the bill to the suspense file on July 15, 2021 and subsequently held it under submission on August 26, 2021. Kalra issued a written statement following the Senate's designation of the Racial Justice Act for All as a two-year bill, regretting that it had not become law in 2021, but that he would "continue to do the hard work to root out racism in our criminal justice system."

== Racial Justice Acts in Other States ==
In his decision in McClesky, Justice Powell invoked a separation-of-powers concern to argue that legislatures are best suited to address statistical racial disparities in the criminal legal system. Despite his deferral to legislatures, only two other states (Kentucky and North Carolina) have enacted Racial Justice Acts in the thirty years since to allow statistical evidence of the kind McClesky rejected. North Carolina's has since been repealed, making California only one of two states to have such an anti-discrimination statute on the books.

The CRJA goes much farther than other Racial Justice Acts in other states. Most notably, both Kentucky and North Carolina's versions of the Racial Justice Act applied only to capital cases and required that race be a "significant factor" in the application of the death sentence. Moreover, the kinds of racial discrimination that amounted to a violation under the Kentucky and North Carolina statutes are much narrower than the California one, which includes non-courtroom actors and goes beyond statistical disparities in sentences.

=== North Carolina ===
North Carolina's 2009 RJA had both prospective and retroactive application. Widespread litigation following the enactment of the 2009 Act appeared to validate concerns that the Act, which applied to all criminal cases, would lead to a "floodgate of litigation". In response, the state legislature amended the statute to allow only county-level (not state-wide) statistics. The law was amended once more, by a then Republican-controlled legislature, to make even county-level statistics insufficient to prove a violation. The law was repealed altogether in 2013. The repeal was intended to have retroactive effect and bar claims already pending under the now-defunct RJA.

The retroactive repeal caused problems even for defendants who had brought successful claims under the RJA. Because of the repeal, the state dismissed the claims of four people (Tilmon Golphin, Quintel Augustine, Christina Walters, and Marcus Robinson) previously resentenced under the RJA as well as those of two other prisoners (Rayford Burke and Andrew Ramseur) who had not had a chance to present evidence at a hearing, However, on June 5, 2020, the North Carolina Supreme Court ruled in favor of Burke and Ramseur, holding that the retroactive intent of the repeal of the RJA violated the constitutional prohibition on ex post facto laws. Because the repeal altered the punishment for a crime that had already been committed, it was thereby unconstitutional. In North Carolina, there were over 100 people who had been denied hearings after the RJA's repeal in 2013.

=== Kentucky ===
The Kentucky Racial Justice Act does permit state-level statistics but operates on a prospective-basis only, unlike North Carolina's. In part because the Act only operates in the relatively brief window of time after a prosecutor has stated their intention to seek the death penalty but before the case proceeds to trial, the Act has been rarely used and its efficacy is unknown. Advocates in Kentucky have described the "difficulty in collecting data for statistical studies and other information necessary to make a successful claim" and have recommended that the legislature require prosecutor's offices to affirmatively collect and report data for death-eligible cases.
