= Madison Nguyen =

American politician (born 1975)

Vice Mayor of San Jose
- In office 2011–2014

Member of the San Jose City Council for District 7
- In office 2005–2014
- Preceded by: Terry Gregory
- Succeeded by: Tam Nguyen

Personal details
- Born: Nguyễn Phượng Tú; January 10, 1975 (age 51) Nha Trang, Vietnam
- Party: Democratic
- Spouse: Terry Tran
- Education: University of California, Santa Cruz (BA); University of Chicago (MA)

Madison Nguyen (Vietnamese: Nguyễn Phượng Tú; born January 10, 1975) is an American politician from California who served on the San Jose City Council from 2005 to 2014, representing District 7, and as Vice-Mayor of San Jose from 2011 to 2014. She was the first Vietnamese-American elected to the city council.

Nguyen previously served as the executive vice president of the Silicon Valley Organization, now known as the San Jose Chamber of Commerce.

== Early life ==
Nguyen was born in the beach city of Nha Trang, Vietnam, as one of nine children. Nguyen and her family escaped Vietnam on a small fishing boat when she was four years old. Her family then settled in a refugee camp in Bataan, Philippines until a Lutheran church sponsored them to Scottsdale, Arizona. Her father worked as a janitor, receiving a stipend of only $500 a month to support his wife and children. Eventually, he moved his family to Modesto, California, in search of employment for his family in Patterson. Nguyen worked in the fields alongside her parents as a teenager. She obtained US citizenship after her 18th birthday, choosing the first name Madison after the character portrayed by Daryl Hannah in the 1984 movie Splash.

In 1997, Nguyen received her Bachelor of Arts in History from the University of California, Santa Cruz. She received a master's degree from the University of Chicago. She returned to California in 2000 to pursue a Ph.D. in sociology at UC Santa Cruz.

== Political career ==
=== School board ===
Nguyen began to become more involved in politics in 2001, while working as a sociology instructor at De Anza College; inspired by MTV's "Rock the Vote" campaign, she and members of the Vietnamese community organised a voter drive in which nearly 5,000 new voters registered to vote for the first time. She followed that up with a run for a position on the Franklin-McKinley School District Board of Education, hoping that her election would encourage Vietnamese Americans to get more involved in local politics. Her win made her one of the first two school board officials of Vietnamese descent in the United States. The other, elected around the same time, was Lan Nguyen of Garden Grove. However, it was Nguyen's organisation of protests in support of Bich Cau Thi Tran, a Vietnamese woman shot to death by a San Jose police constable that brought her to the forefront of people's minds in the Vietnamese American community. Nguyen, who felt the incident was being ignored by the public and the media, organised a rally to which nearly 300 people showed up.

=== City Council ===
In September 2005, she ran for city council in a special election to replace Terry Gregory in District 7. Vietnamese Americans, who formed less than 10% of San Jose's population at the time, turned out in record numbers during the primary election in June to support Madison Nguyen and Linda Nguyen, pushing them ahead of seven other candidates. Madison Nguyen won 44% of the primary vote, while Linda Nguyen, a real estate attorney, received 27%. In the run-off, Madison Nguyen received 62% of the votes cast, beating out Linda Nguyen to become the first Vietnamese American to serve on the San Jose's City Council.

==== District naming controversy and recall attempt ====
Nguyen's support from the Vietnamese American community suffered a sharp reversal in early January 2008, in a controversy over whether the Little Saigon district, an area of a Story Road in her council district with a large percentage of Vietnamese retailers, should be named as "Little Saigon" or "Little Saigon Business District". Little Saigon is a common name used for various other Vietnamese-American commercial enclaves, particularly known in Orange County, California. Nguyen suggested the name "Little Saigon Business District" after she heard from different groups in her council district who wanted the word "New" to be included in the name, indicating a new life in America after they left their homeland. She thought Saigon Business District was a good compromise between Little Saigon and New Saigon so she recommended Saigon Business District as the name for the designation. Supporters of the Little Saigon denounced Nguyen as a traitor to the community because she did not support what they deemed as the "majority" of the Vietnamese community supported, which was "Little Saigon." The City Council voted to name the business district as Little Saigon Business District.

After recurring protests in front of City Hall for several months, on 4 March 2008, the city council voted to rescind the "Little Saigon Business District" name, but stopped short of renaming it "Little Saigon". Instead, they proposed setting up a process by which business owners could choose district names. However, anger against Nguyen remained. On 22 April 2008, the issue was reopened with the submission of recall papers against Nguyen by the Recall Madison Nguyen committee. On 9 October the petition qualified for the 3 March 2009 ballot, having garnered more than 150% of the needed valid signatures. On 3 March 2009, voters rejected the recall attempt with a 55-45% vote. A year later, Nguyen won re-election and in 2011, she was nominated by Mayor Chuck Reed and was approved unanimously by the city council to be Vice Mayor. She is also the first Vietnamese Vice Mayor in the history of San Jose.

=== 2014 mayoral campaign ===
Nguyen ran unsuccessfully in the 2014 San Jose mayoral election, placing third in the first round, thus, failing to advance to the runoff election.

Nguyen formally filed to run for mayor on December 19, 2012, becoming the second candidate to do so.

Per Mike Rosenberg of The Mercury News, Nguyen centered her candidacy heavily on her life story, with less emphasis on her record or policy positions. During her campaign, Rosenberg wrote that Nguyen, "has an inspiring rags-to-riches story stemming from her family’s escape from Vietnam and has built a coalition of supporters — especially the city’s large immigrant population — who see a rare politician they can connect with."

=== 2016 State Assembly campaign ===
In April 2015, Madison Nguyen announced her intention to run for California State Assembly District 27, an open seat being vacated by term-limited Nora Campos. The primary election was in June 2016, followed by a November general election, which coincided with the next presidential contest. Nguyen began rolling out her campaign platform soon after her announcement. Her first significant proposal was to support a new University of California campus, and to locate it in San Jose. Her first notable endorsement came from San Jose Mayor Sam Liccardo. Other declared candidates included San Jose City Councillor Ash Kalra, Santa Clara County Board of Education Trustee Darcie Green, activist Cong Do, and Republican Van Le.

Madison won a decisive victory in the primary, with more than 11,000 more votes than her closest competitor.

Originally predicted to easily win the general election over Ash Kalra, she ultimately lost in an upset, in part after Kalra managed to run effective mailers focusing on police shortages in San Jose.

=== 2024 Board of Supervisors Campaign ===
In May 2023, Madison Nguyen announced her intention to run for the Santa Clara County Board of Supervisors District 2 seat, an open seat being vacated by term-limited Cindy Chavez. Her stated priorities for the Board of Supervisors included affordable housing, homelessness and public safety.

Nguyen placed second in the March 2024 primary behind Betty Duong, former chief of staff of supervisor Cindy Chavez. Either candidate would be Santa Clara County's first-ever Vietnamese supervisor. In November 2024, Nguyen lost the general election to Betty Duong.

== Subsequent career ==
In February 2017, Nguyen became executive director for the nonprofit Hunger at Home.

Nguyen currently is Vice President at PRxDigital, focusing on the tech sector and local municipalities.

== Electoral history ==
=== San Jose City Council ===
2005 San Jose City Council district 7 special election
Candidate	General Election		Runoff Election	
Candidate	Votes	%	Votes	%
Madison Nguyen	3,341	44.61	5,603	62.55
Linda Nguyen	1,990	26.57	3,355	37.45
Beth Gonzales	950	12.68		
Ed Voss	704	9.40		
Rudy Rodriguez	351	4.69		
Timothy Lauwers	71	0.95		
Mahealani	42	0.56		
Andrew Abraham Diaz	41	0.55		
Turnout	7,490		8,958	30.45

2006 San Jose City Council district 7 election
Candidate	Votes	%
Madison Nguyen (incumbent)	7,179	100
Total votes	7,179	100

2009 San Jose City Council district 7 recall election
Candidate	Votes	%
No (against recall)	7,270	55.21
Yes (for recall)	5,897	44.79
Total votes	13,167	100
Turnout	{{{votes}}}	42.78%

2010 San Jose City Council district 7 election
Candidate	General Election		Runoff Election	
Candidate	Votes	%	Votes	%
Madison Nguyen (incumbent)	4,578	41.33	7,625	54.33
Minh Duong	2,666	24.07	6,410	45.67
Patrick Phu Le	1,895	17.11		
Rudy J. Rodriguez	1,586	14.32		
Vietnam Nguyen	351	3.17		
Total	11,076	100	14,035	100

=== San Jose mayor ===
2014 San Jose mayoral election
Candidate	General Election		Runoff Election	
Candidate	Votes	%	Votes	%
Sam Liccardo	33,521	25.75	91,840	50.76
Dave Cortese	43,887	33.72	89,090	49.24
Madison Nguyen	26,365	20.26		
Pierluigi C. Oliverio	13,197	10.14		
Rose Herrera	7,950	6.11		
Mike Alvarado	1,959	1.51		
Timothy Harrison	1,715	1.32		
Bill Chew	1,563	1.20		
Total	130,157	100	180,930	100

=== California state assembly ===
California's 27th State Assembly district election, 2016
Primary election
Party	Candidate	Votes	%
Democratic	Madison Nguyen	27,453	34.3
Democratic	Ash Kalra	15,843	19.8
Republican	Van Le	11,726	14.7
Democratic	Andres Quintero	10,922	13.7
Democratic	Cong Thanh Do	4,869	6.1
Democratic	Darcie Green	4,769	6.0
Democratic	Esau Herrera	4,342	5.4
Total votes		79,924	100.0
General election
Democratic	Ash Kalra	69,934	53.2
Democratic	Madison Nguyen	61,436	46.8
Total votes		131,370	100.0
Democratic hold			

=== Santa Clara County Board of Supervisors ===
Santa Clara County Board of Supervisors Election, 2024
Primary election
Party	Candidate	Votes	%
Nonpartisan	Betty Duong	14,031	31.85
Nonpartisan	Madison Nguyen	12,794	29.04
Nonpartisan	Corina Herrera-Loera	10,519	23.87
Nonpartisan	Nelson McElmurry	4,321	9.81
Nonpartisan	Jennifer Margaret Celaya	2,394	5.43
Total votes		44,059	100.0
General election
Nonpartisan	Betty Duong	52,584	53.40
Nonpartisan	Madison Nguyen	45,897	46.60
Total votes		98,481	100.0
