= Berryessa Union School District =

School district in California, United States

Location
- San Jose, California; United States

Other information
- Website: www.berryessa.k12.ca.us

The Berryessa Union School District is a school district based in the Berryessa district of San Jose, California. It operates ten elementary schools (K-5) and three middle schools (6-8). The district's superintendent is Dr. Roxane Fuentes. The Berryessa schools have tended to improve over the last decade, with the top performer, Northwood Elementary School, having an API (Academic Performance Index) of 903 (out of 1000) as of fall 2008. In 2011, Vinci Park Elementary School had the largest API increase in district history, having a 48-point increase. Graduates from the middle schools (Morrill, Sierramont and Piedmont) normally attend Piedmont Hills High School or Independence High School. Notable students include Jerry Yang, who is the co-founder and former CEO of Yahoo!, who went to Sierramont. He also attended Ruskin Elementary School prior to Sierramont and later attended at Piedmont Hills High School. At Sierramont Middle School, Piedmont Middle School, and Morrill Middle School, there is also a Berryessa Chinese School. The district also has an American football team called the Berryessa Cougars. On December 18, 2024, the Berryessa Union School District Board of Trustees 4-1 decided to close Cherrywood, Toyon and Laneview for the 25-26 school year following budget deficits and declining enrollment.

School facts
School name	Students	FTE teachers	Pupil/teacher ratio
Brooktree Elementary School	397	19 (2025)	20.9
Cherrywood Elementary School (set close in the 25-26 school year)	523	24	21.8
Majestic Way Elementary School	528	25	21.1
Morrill Middle School	665	32(2026)	20.8
Notes	(replace this with notes and un-comment line) -->
Noble Elementary School	511	24	21.3
Northwood Elementary School	412	22	18.7
Piedmont Middle School	991	41	24.2
Ruskin Elementary School	621	29	21.4
Sierramont Middle School	1011	42	24.1
Summerdale Elementary School	505	26	19.4
Toyon Elementary School (set close in the 25-26 school year)	454	22	20.6
Vinci Park Elementary School	750	31	22.1

Note: Based on 2002-2003 school year data

In 2023, the district office was moved from the Piedmont Hills area to McKay-Ringwood.
