= Mayor of San José =

Mayor of San José may refer to:

- Mayor of San Jose, California; or
- Mayor of San José, Costa Rica.
