= Kim Campbell (pilot) =

US Air Force officer

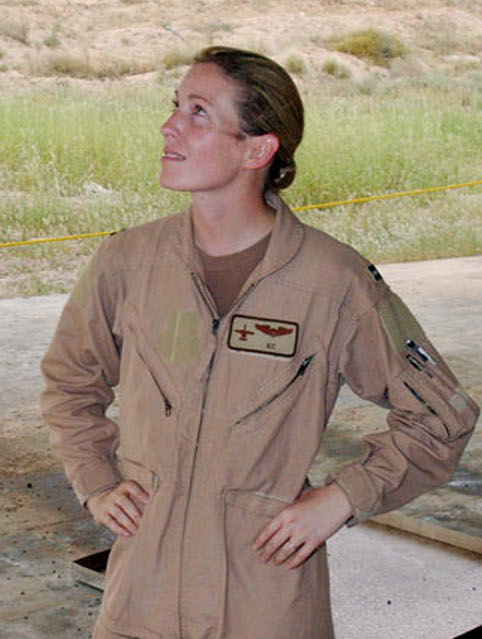
- Campbell in 2003
- Born: Kim Nichole Reed; June 6, 1975 (age 51); Honolulu, Hawaii, United States
- Education: United States Air Force Academy; Imperial College London (Marshall Scholar); University of Reading
- Military career
- Allegiance: United States
- Branch: United States Air Force
- Service years: 1997–2021
- Rank: Colonel
- Nickname: "Killer Chick"
- Commands: 612th Theater Operations Group; 355th Operations Support Squadron
- Conflicts: Iraq War; War in Afghanistan
- Awards: Defense Superior Service Medal; Legion of Merit; Distinguished Flying Cross

Colonel Kim Nichole Reed-Campbell (born June 6, 1975) is a retired United States Air Force officer and Command Pilot. She was decorated for piloting her A-10 Thunderbolt II back to base in southern Iraq after taking heavy anti-aircraft artillery (AAA) damage in aerial combat over Baghdad during Operation Iraqi Freedom in 2003. After her tour of duty in Iraq ended, Campbell gave lectures throughout the United States about her experience, including one at the National Air and Space Museum. Campbell was promoted to the rank of Major in 2006.

Colonel Campbell was Commander, 612th Theater Operations Group, Davis–Monthan Air Force Base, from July 2016 to June 2018. Her final assignment was at the United States Air Force Academy as the Director of the Center for Character and Leadership Development.

In 2023, she was a visiting professor at Reichman University in Herzliya, Israel teaching Leadership & International Security.

She is married to another A-10 pilot, Colonel Scott Campbell, whom she met at the Air Force Academy.

== Education ==
Campbell graduated with a Bachelor of Science degree from the United States Air Force Academy in 1997, where she was the cadet wing commander (the highest position a USAFA cadet can achieve), as was her father during his time as a cadet at the Air Force Academy; the first time that a father and daughter both served as cadet wing commander.

== April 2003 incident ==
During a mission over Baghdad on 7 April 2003, Campbell's aircraft (A-10A s/n 81-0987) suffered extensive damage from enemy AAA. "We did our job with the guys there on the ground, and as we were on our way out is when I felt the jet get hit. It was pretty obvious — it was loud... I lost all hydraulics instantaneously, and the jet rolled left and pointed toward the ground, which was an uncomfortable feeling over Baghdad. It didn't respond to any of my control inputs."

She tried several procedures to get the aircraft under control, none of which worked; she put the plane into manual reversion, controlling the aircraft through a system of cables and pulleys.

The A-10 immediately responded. "The jet started climbing away from the ground, which was a good feeling because there was no way I wanted to eject over Baghdad." With some technical advice from her flight leader, Lieutenant Colonel Turner, she flew the crippled plane for an hour back to the air base. "The jet was performing exceptionally well. I had no doubt in my mind I was going to land that airplane."

Landing was complicated by the damage the aircraft had sustained. She knew three other pilots had attempted to land using manual reversion. One had cartwheeled the aircraft and died. "When you lose all the hydraulics, you don't have speed brakes, you don't have brakes, and you don't have steering."

After landing, ground crews discovered that her A-10 had sustained damage to one engine and to the redundant hydraulic systems, disabling the flight controls, landing gear and brakes, and horizontal stabilizer. A detailed inspection revealed hundreds of holes from extensive flak damage to the airframe, and that large sections of the stabilizer and hydraulic controls were missing.

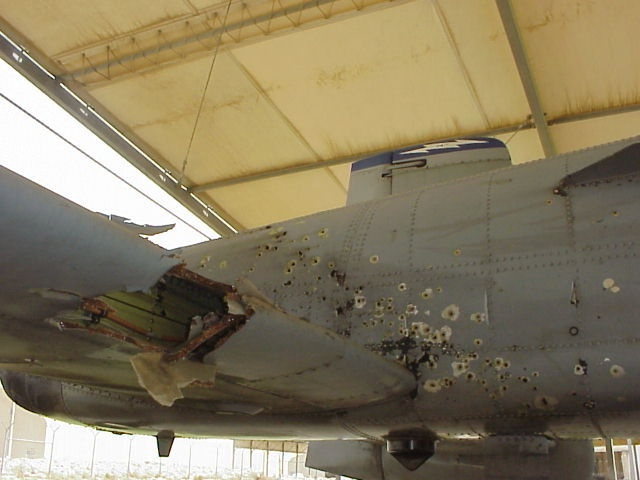
Kim Campbell's A-10 suffered extensive damage.

For this action in aerial combat, Campbell was awarded the Distinguished Flying Cross. "She's one of the few pilots who ever landed the A-10 in the manual mode," said General Richard Myers, USAF, Chairman of the Joint Chiefs of Staff.

== Selected publications ==
- Campbell, Kim (2023). Flying in the Face of Fear: A Fighter Pilot's Lessons on Leading with Courage. Hoboken, New Jersey: Wiley. ISBN 978-1-394-15235-3.
