= Phaedra Ellis-Lamkins =

American businesswoman (born 1976)

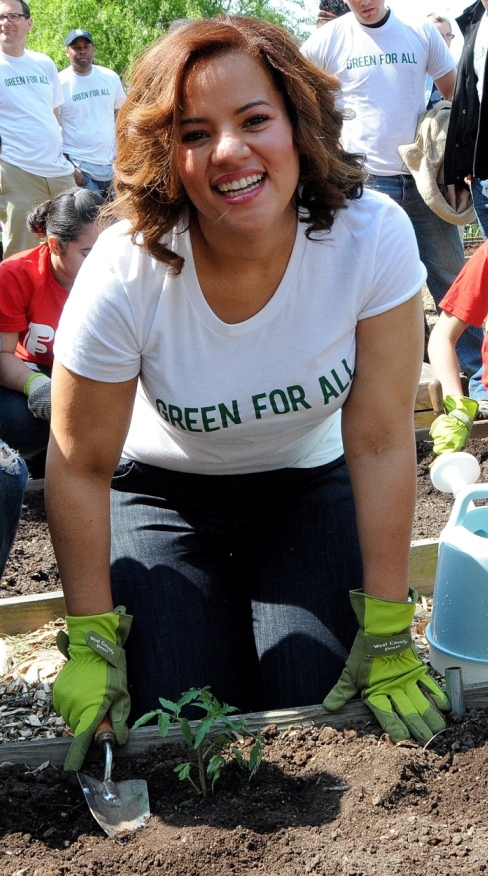
- Born: 1976 (age 49–50)
- Occupation: Entrepreneur
- Known for: Co-founder and CEO of Promise

Phaedra Ellis-Lamkins (born 1976) is an American entrepreneur and former labor organizer. She is the co-founder and chief executive officer of Promise, a technology company that manages bill collection for government agencies and utilities.

Earlier in her career, Ellis-Lamkins was executive director of the South Bay AFL–CIO Labor Council. She was chief executive officer of Green for All and worked at the home-care technology company Honor.

== Career ==
After graduating from California State University, Northridge in 1998, Ellis-Lamkins became a union organizer with SEIU Local 715 in San Jose. She later was executive director of the South Bay AFL-CIO Labor Council.

Ellis-Lamkins joined Green for All as chief executive officer in March 2009. She lobbied for policies supporting green-sector job creation and increasing workforce participation among low-income, working-class, and minority communities.

Iin 2014, Ellis-Lamkins became the manager for the musician Prince. Van Jones credited her for securing Prince ownership of his masters and stated "it was the happiest day I have ever seen him."

In 2015 Ellis-Lamkins joined Honor, Inc. as their Head of Care. Honor is a San Francisco-based technology start up that helps people secure in-home care professionals.

In 2017, Ellis-Lamkins co-founded Promise and is chief executive. The company initially focused on bail reform then shifted to managing bill collection for state and local governments and utilities, including offering payment plans and loans with no interest to people who are delinquent.

== Awards and recognition ==
In 2018, Ellis-Lamkins received a Silver SPUR Award from SPUR.
