= Kansen Chu =

American politician from California

- 朱感生
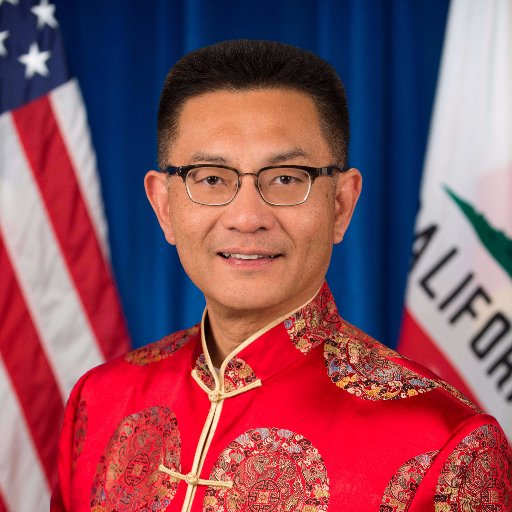

Member of the California State Assembly from the 25th district
- In office December 1, 2014 – December 7, 2020
- Preceded by: Bob Wieckowski
- Succeeded by: Alex Lee

Member of the San Jose City Council from District 4
- In office 2007–2014
- Preceded by: Chuck Reed

Member of the Berryessa Union School District Board of Trustees
- In office February 10, 2021 – 2022

Personal details
- Born: October 27, 1952 (age 73) Taipei, Taiwan
- Party: Democratic
- Spouse: Daisy Chu
- Children: 2
- Education: National Taipei University of Technology (BS); California State University, Northridge (MS)
- Occupation: Computer programmer, restaurant owner, politician

Kansen Chu (Chinese: 朱感生; pinyin: Zhū Gǎnshēng; born October 27, 1952) is a Taiwanese-born American politician. A Democrat, Chu was a member of the California State Assembly from 2014 to 2020, for the 25th District, which encompasses parts of the South and East Bay regions of the San Francisco Bay Area.

In 2019, Chu announced that he would not seek reelection for State Assembly in 2020, instead running for the Santa Clara County Board of Supervisors. He lost to Otto Lee in the general election.

On February 10, 2021, Chu was appointed to the Berryessa Union School District Board of Trustees to fill a vacant seat. His current term ends in 2022.

Chu ran for the 24th Assembly district seat in the redrawn 2022 election, but was defeated in the primary by incumbent Alex Lee.

After losing his comeback bid for the State Assembly, Chu attempted a comeback bid for San Jose City Council. He announced plans to challenge incumbent Councilmember David Cohen in 2023 for District 4, centered around the Berryessa and North San Jose. However, Chu lost his bid for his former seat, only receiving 41.4% of the vote, to Cohen's 58.6%.

== Early life and education ==
Chu was born in Taipei, Taiwan, in 1952. He graduated from National Taipei University of Technology with a Bachelor of Science (B.S.) in electrical engineering and earned a master's degree in electrical engineering from California State University, Northridge.

== Career ==
In 1978, Chu became a microdiagnostics microprogrammer at IBM, where he worked for 18 years. In 1989, Chu became an owner of a Chinese restaurant, until 2007.

In 2002, Chu began his political career as a member of Berryessa Union School District board of education.

Prior to being elected to the Assembly in 2014, Chu was a San Jose City Councilmember representing District 4. He is a member of the California Asian & Pacific Islander Legislative Caucus. He was the first Taiwanese-American elected to the San Jose City Council.

=== 2000 San Jose City Council ===
In 2000, Chu was defeated by Chuck Reed for the District 4 council seat.

In his first year on the council (2007), Chu initiated landmark legislation to require citywide green building standards, ban the use of plastic bags, and mandate the installation of automatic heart defibrillators across San Jose.

=== 2002 Berryessa Union School Board ===
In 2002, Chu was elected to the Berryessa Union School Board. As a school board member, he championed stronger curricula, better education materials, and improved public access to school board meetings.

Chu has served on the Berryessa Union School Board for 5 years, Santa Clara Valley Metro YMCA, Vietnamese Voluntary Foundation, Shin Shin Education Foundation, and advisory board of Californians for Justice. Kansen has also served on the Santa Clara County Mental Health Board, Private Industry Council under Job Training Partnership Act, Neighborhood Accountability Board of Berryessa, the KNTV Channel 11 Community Board, Asian Law Alliance, and many other advisory commissions and boards. He continues to serve on the board of Vision New America, dedicated to advancing youth involvement in civics and government.

=== Departing the California Assembly ===
On May 13, 2019, Chu announced that he would be a candidate for the Santa Clara County Board of Supervisors in 2020. He will not be seeking reelection to the Assembly.

== Election history ==
=== 2014 California State Assembly ===
California's 25th State Assembly district election, 2014
Primary election
Party	Candidate	Votes	%
Democratic	Kansen Chu	16,672	30.6
Republican	Bob Brunton	12,699	23.3
Democratic	Armando Gomez	9,218	16.9
Democratic	Teresa Cox	9,104	16.7
Democratic	Craig Steckler	6,835	12.5
Total votes		54,528	100.0
General election
Democratic	Kansen Chu	57,718	69.4
Republican	Bob Brunton	25,441	30.6
Total votes		83,159	100.0
Democratic hold			

=== 2016 California State Assembly ===
California's 25th State Assembly district election, 2016
Primary election
Party	Candidate	Votes	%
Democratic	Kansen Chu (incumbent)	61,980	75.5
Republican	Bob Brunton	20,146	24.5
Total votes		82,126	100.0
General election
Democratic	Kansen Chu (incumbent)	107,821	72.8
Republican	Bob Brunton	40,280	27.2
Total votes		148,101	100.0
Democratic hold			

=== 2018 California State Assembly ===
California's 25th State Assembly district election, 2018
Primary election
Party	Candidate	Votes	%
Democratic	Kansen Chu (incumbent)	36,417	51.8
Republican	Bob Brunton	16,391	23.3
Democratic	Carmen Montano	15,345	21.8
Libertarian	Robert Imhoff	2,127	3.0
Total votes		70,280	100.0
General election
Democratic	Kansen Chu (incumbent)	98,612	74.3
Republican	Bob Brunton	34,193	25.7
Total votes		132,805	100.0
Democratic hold			

== Personal life ==
In 1976, Chu moved to the United States. Chu's wife is Daisy Chu. They have two children. Chu and his family live in San Jose, California.
