= Johnny Khamis =

American politician

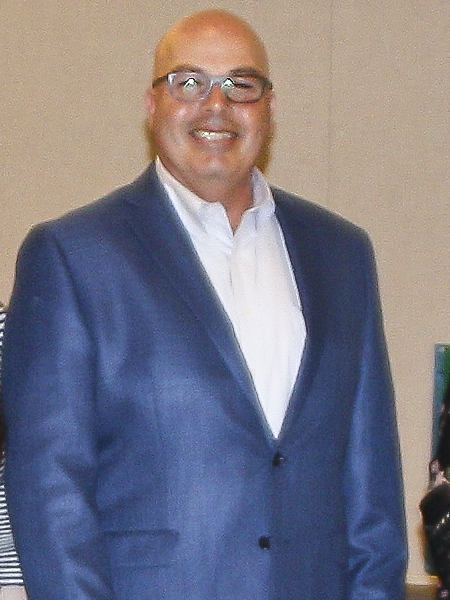

Member of the San Jose City Council for the 10th district
- In office January 1, 2013 – December 31, 2020
- Preceded by: Nancy Pyle
- Succeeded by: Matt Mahan

Personal details
- Born: Lebanon
- Party: Independent
- Other political affiliations: Republican (before 2018)
- Education: San Jose State University (BS)

Johnny Khamis is an American politician and businessman who served as a member of the San Jose City Council for the 10th district from January 1, 2013, to December 31, 2020.

== Early life and education ==
Khamis is a Palestinian Christian. Born in Lebanon, he grew up in San Jose and attended local public schools, graduating from Oak Grove High School. He is a graduate of San Jose State University, where he earned a bachelor's degree in business management and communication.

== Career ==
Khamis is the former CEO and founder of Western Benefit Solutions, a San Jose-based firm that deals in insurance benefit plan consulting.

Khamis was a member of the Republican Party, until changing his registration to no party preference in protest of the Trump administration family separation policy. City council positions are officially nonpartisan per California law. Upon his swearing-in on December 31, 2012, he became the first Arab-American to take office for the city of San Jose. He is the former regional director of the California Congress of Republicans, the former chair of the Santa Clara County Human Relations Commission, and the former chair of the San Jose Small Business Development Commission during his time as a council member.

== Elections ==
In 2022, Khamis was a candidate in the 2022 Santa Clara County Board of Supervisors election for the 1st district. He came in second in the primary election and he lost in the general election to Sylvia Arenas.

On March 3, 2020, in the primary election, Khamis lost when he placed 5th place in his race for California's 15th senatorial district behind Republican Robert Howell, Democrat Nora Campos, and the top two vote getters who would move on to general election in November, Ann Ravel and eventual winner Dave Cortese.

In the 2012 San Jose city council election, Khamis got the highest vote total of the six candidates in the June primary and won the November general election 52.6% to 47.4%. In his re-election bid in 2016, he received 76% of the vote in the primary election, winning outright forgoing a November general election.
