= Pierluigi Oliverio =

American politician (born 1969)

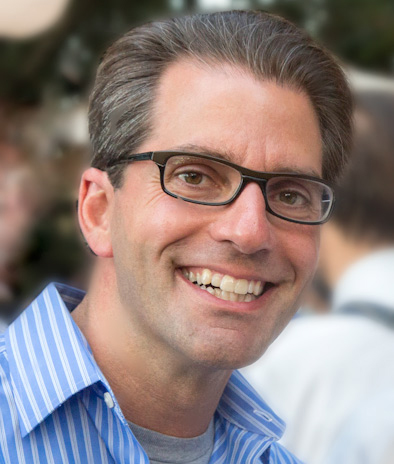

Member of the San Jose City Council from the 6th district
- In office March 20, 2007 – December 31, 2016
- Preceded by: Ken Yeager
- Succeeded by: Devora Davis

Personal details
- Born: 1969 (age 56–57) San Jose, California, U.S.
- Party: Democratic
- Education: DeAnza College; San Jose State University (BA)

Pierluigi Oliverio (born 1969) is an American former politician. He served on the San Jose City Council representing the 6th district from March 2007 and left office due to term limits in December 2016.

== Early life and education ==
Oliverio was born and raised in the Willow Glen neighborhood of San Jose, California. His parents, Italo and Matilde Oliverio, immigrated from Italy. He attended San José Unified School District schools Booksin Elementary School, Herbert Hoover Middle School, and Willow Glen High School. As a youth, he was a paperboy for The Mercury News. Oliverio graduated from DeAnza College and San Jose State University.

== Political campaigns ==
=== 2014 ===
Oliverio unsuccessfully ran for mayor of San Jose in 2014. He was eliminated from the race in the June primary election, coming in fourth with just over 10% of the vote.

=== 2016 ===
Oliverio ran unsuccessfully as a candidate for California's 17th congressional district in the 2016 election, coming in fifth place with 4.2% of the vote.

Two months after losing his run for Congress, Oliverio filed papers in August 2016 to campaign for the 4th district seat on the Santa Clara Valley Open Space Authority's board of directors. He lost against incumbent Dorsey Moore.

=== 2018 ===
In 2018, Oliverio unsuccessfully ran for the Santa Clara County Board of Supervisors in District 4 to replace outgoing incumbent Ken Yeager. In the days after the election night, it seemed that Oliverio came in for a second place runoff election by a slim 105-vote margin. However, it became clear that this was a third place showing as the Santa Clara County Registrar of Voters continued its round-the-clock tally of provisional and mailed-in ballots.

In May 2018, Oliverio was censured by the Democratic Central Committee of Santa Clara County due to a sexual harassment claim filed by his ex-chief of staff Denelle Fedor in 2014 and settled by the city for $10,000 in 2015. Oliverio alleged that the real purpose of the censure was to punish his campaign for being endorsed by the Silicon Valley Organization.

Preceded by Ken Yeager	Member of the San Jose City Council from the 6th district 2006–2016	Succeeded by Devora Davis
