= Ash Kalra =

American politician

- Kalra at the SVAFF in 2026

Member of the California State Assembly
- Incumbent
- Assumed office December 5, 2016
- Preceded by: Nora Campos
- Constituency: 27th district (2016–2022); 25th district (2022–present)

Member of the San Jose City Council from the 2nd district
- In office January 6, 2009 – December 5, 2016
- Preceded by: Forrest Williams
- Succeeded by: Sergio Jimenez

Personal details
- Born: January 21, 1972 (age 54) Toronto, Ontario, Canada
- Party: Democratic
- Education: University of California, Santa Barbara (BA); Georgetown University (JD)

Ash Kalra (born January 21, 1972) is a Canadian-American politician who has served as a member of the California State Assembly since 2016. A member of the Democratic Party, Kalra previously served on the San Jose City Council from 2008 to 2016.

Kalra represents the 25th Assembly District, which encompasses parts of eastern San Jose, and chairs the California Legislative Progressive Caucus and the Assembly Labor and Employment Committee. A first-generation immigrant, he is the first Hindu and Indian American to serve in the California State Legislature.

== Early life and education ==
Kalra was born in Toronto to Punjabi parents from India. His family immigrated to the United States in 1978 and settled in San Jose, California, where Kalra has lived ever since.

Kalra attended San Jose public schools and is a graduate of Oak Grove High School. He attended the University of California, Santa Barbara, where he received a Bachelor of Arts in communications in 1993, and later Georgetown University, from which he graduated with a Juris Doctor in 1996.

== Legal career ==
As a law student, Kalra taught at inner city schools in Washington, D.C. He returned to San Jose after law school and became a law professor at San Jose State University and Lincoln Law School.

In addition to teaching, Kalra was a deputy public defender for Santa Clara County for 11 years. He represented clients in felony and misdemeanor trials and spent most of his time in drug treatment court to help his clients get into rehabilitation programs.

== Political career ==
Kalra was elected to the San Jose City Council in 2008 and served two terms on the city council. He represented District 2, which encompassed South San Jose.

Kalra was first elected to the California State Assembly in 2016, succeeding term-limited Democrat Nora Campos and defeating fellow Democrat and San Jose city councilmember Madison Nguyen. He is the first Hindu and Indian American to serve in the California State Legislature.

Kalra currently chairs the California Legislative Progressive Caucus as well as the Assembly Labor and Employment Committee and the Assembly Select Committee on the Future of Work and Workers.

Kalra supported Bernie Sanders's 2020 presidential campaign. He was mentioned as a possible replacement for Xavier Becerra as Attorney General of California following Becerra's appointment as Secretary of Health and Human Services, but fellow Bay Area assemblymember Rob Bonta was appointed instead.

Kalra authored the California Racial Justice Act of 2020. In 2023, Kalra authored legislation that would prohibit the towing or immobilizing vehicles due to unpaid parking tickets. The San Jose Department of Transportation spokesperson said that the legislation would make parking enforcement in San Jose more difficult.

Kalra is a member of the California Legislative Progressive Caucus.

== Personal life ==
Kalra lives in San Jose. He practices Hinduism and is a vegan.

In 2011, Kalra was arrested for and pleaded no contest to driving under the influence of alcohol. He was sentenced to serve community service hours and receive counseling.

== Electoral history ==
=== San Jose City Council ===
2008 San Jose City Council 2nd district election
Primary election
Candidate	Votes	%
Ash Kalra	4,764	42.21
Jacquelyn "Jackie" Adams	2,095	18.56
Ram Singh	2,083	18.46
Ted Scarlett	896	7.94
Nicholas J. Rice-Sanchez	800	7.09
Bui Thang	648	5.47
Total votes	11,286	100.00
General election
Ash Kalra	15,639	54.43
Jacquelyn "Jackie" Adams	13,095	45.57
Total votes	28,734	100.00

2012 San Jose City Council 2nd district election
Primary election
Candidate	Votes	%
Ash Kalra (incumbent)	6,671	53.03
Jacquelyn "Jackie" Adams	5,909	46.97
Total votes	12,580	100.00

=== California State Assembly ===
2016 California State Assembly 27th district election
Primary election
Party	Candidate	Votes	%
Democratic	Madison Nguyen	27,453	34.3
Democratic	Ash Kalra	15,843	19.8
Republican	Van Le	11,726	14.7
Democratic	Andres Quintero	10,922	13.7
Democratic	Cong Thanh Do	4,869	6.1
Democratic	Darcie Green	4,769	6.0
Democratic	Esau Herrera	4,342	5.4
Total votes		79,924	100.0
General election
Democratic	Ash Kalra	71,696	53.2
Democratic	Madison Nguyen	63,048	46.8
Total votes		134,744	100.0
Democratic hold			

2018 California State Assembly 27th district election
Primary election
Party	Candidate	Votes	%
Democratic	Ash Kalra (incumbent)	51,825	99.5
Republican	G. Burt Lancaster (write-in)	285	0.5
Total votes		52,110	100.0
General election
Democratic	Ash Kalra (incumbent)	90,068	76.3
Republican	G. Burt Lancaster	27,990	23.7
Total votes		118,058	100.0
Democratic hold			

2020 California State Assembly 27th district election
Primary election
Party	Candidate	Votes	%
Democratic	Ash Kalra (incumbent)	66,324	75.7
Republican	G. Burt Lancaster	21,323	24.3
Total votes		62,761	100.0
General election
Democratic	Ash Kalra (incumbent)	127,772	72.6
Republican	G. Burt Lancaster	48,112	27.4
Total votes		62,761	100.0
Democratic hold			

2022 California State Assembly 25th district election
Primary election
Party	Candidate	Votes	%
Democratic	Ash Kalra (incumbent)	47,942	71.5
Republican	Ted Stroll	19,123	28.5
Total votes		67,065	100.0
General election
Democratic	Ash Kalra (incumbent)	74,546	70.0
Republican	Ted Stroll	31,893	30.0
Total votes		106,439	100.0
Democratic hold			

2024 California State Assembly 25th district election
Primary election
Party	Candidate	Votes	%
Democratic	Ash Kalra (incumbent)	35,840	51.5
Republican	Ted Stroll	18,276	26.2
Democratic	Lan Ngo	15,510	22.3
Total votes		69,626	100.0
General election
Democratic	Ash Kalra (incumbent)	107,968	68.4
Republican	Ted Stroll	49,861	31.6
Total votes		157,829	100.0
Democratic hold			
