= Nancy Pyle =

American educator and politician

San Jose City Council
- In office 2005–2012
- Preceded by: Pat Dando
- Succeeded by: Johnny Khamis

Personal details
- Born: 1937 or 1938; Syracuse, New York, U.S.
- Died: July 14, 2023 (aged 85); San Jose, California, U.S.
- Political party: Democratic
- Profession: Teacher; Politician

Nancy Pyle (née Halloran; 1937 or 1938 – July 14, 2023) was an American educator and politician. A Democrat, she served on the San Jose City Council from 2005 to 2012. Pyle was previously a school teacher and president of her local community college district board.

== Early life and education ==
Pyle grew up on a farm near Syracuse, New York, one of four children of Lawrence and Dorothy (Edwards) Halloran, dairy farmers who ran Gillie Brook Stables. She graduated from Le Moyne College, and later earned a master's degree in Educational Administration from the United States International University in San Diego.

== Career ==
Pyle was an elementary school teacher and worked in the San Jose Unified School District for over 25 years before retiring from teaching in 1996. She then served on the San Jose-Evergreen Community College District board for 8 years, including a term as board president.

In 1995 and 2000, Pyle lost her initial bids for San Jose City Council, but would go onto finally win a seat in 2004. She served two full terms from 2005 to 2012, representing District 10, which covers South San Jose including Almaden Valley and Blossom Valley.

During her time in office, Pyle was credited with bringing a Whole Foods store to the area. In 2010, she helped raise half of the funding needed to keep a swim program open at Almaden Lake Park, and had the city provide the other half.

On December 5, 2012, Pyle was honored by U.S. Representatives Zoe Lofgren, Anna Eshoo and Mike Honda for her work on the San Jose City Council, including funding the city's Domestic Violence Prevention Program with $20,000 from her own office. In March 2016, she received a "lifetime achievement award" from State Senator Jim Beall, who noted that she had campaigned door-to-door to gain support for a bond measure while serving as a San Jose-Evergreen Community College District trustee.

== Personal life ==
In 1960, she moved her family to San Jose. She divorced her first husband in 1969. She later met Roger Pyle, who would become her second husband.

In 2015, she suffered a heart attack while attending a luncheon and needed to be resuscitated.

Pyle died from complications of dementia in San Jose, California, on July 14, 2023, at the age of 85. She was survived by her second husband and her two children.
