= International Federation of Professional and Technical Engineers =

North American trade union

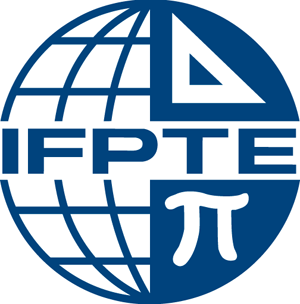
- Abbreviation: IFPTE
- Formation: 1918; 108 years ago
- Type: Trade union
- Headquarters: Washington, DC, US
- Locations: Canada; United States
- Members: 64,816 (2026)
- President: Matt Biggs
- Affiliations: AFL–CIO; Canadian Labour Congress
- Website: ifpte.org
- Formerly called: International Federation of Draftsmen's Unions (1918–1919); International Federation of Technical Engineers, Architects, and Draftsmen's Unions (1919–1950); American Federation of Technical Engineers (1950–1972)

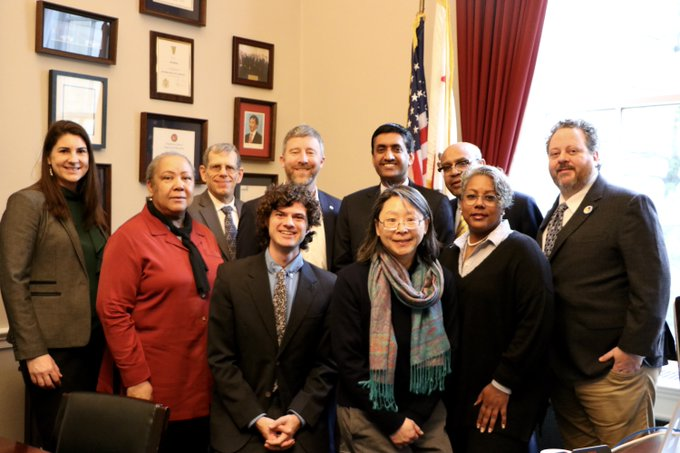
Ro Khanna with IFPTE representatives in 2020

The International Federation of Professional and Technical Engineers (IFPTE) is a North American labor union representing various professional, technical, and administrative support workers in the United States and Canada, in both the public and private sectors.

Its roots may be traced back to the International Federation of Draftsmen's Unions, a craft union for shipyard engineers and draftsmen, chartered by the American Federation of Labor in 1918, and expanding its jurisdiction in 1919 to become the International Federation of Technical Engineers, Architects, and Draftsmen's Unions.

== Presidents ==
C. L. Rosemund
Foster J. Pratt
Russell M. Stephens
1967: James Woodside
1970: William T. Cleary
1972: Rodney A. Bower
1985: James Sommerhauser
1994: Paul Almeida
2001: Greg Junemann
2018: Paul Shearon
2021: Matt Biggs

== Local unions ==
=== Local 1 ===
IFPTE Local 1 represents federal employees of the United States Navy at the Norfolk Naval Shipyard (NNSY and RCT Bargaining Units) in Portsmouth, Virginia, the Mid Atlantic Regional Maintenance Center (MARMC) in Norfolk, Virginia, Supervisor of Shipbuilding (SSNN) in Newport News, Virginia, the Submarine Technical Support Center (STSC) in Groton, Connecticut, the Southeast Regional Maintenance Center (SERMC) in Mayport, Florida and Carrier Planning Activity (CPA).

=== Local 4 ===
IFPTE Local 4 represents federal employees at Portsmouth Naval Shipyard (PNS) in Kittery, Maine.

=== Local 12 ===
IFPTE Local 12 represents employees at Puget Sound Naval Shipyard & Intermediate Maintenance Facility (PSNS & IMF) on Puget Sound at Bremerton, Washington.

=== Local 21 ===
IFPTE Local 21 represents over 11,000 public employees in the San Francisco Bay Area.

=== Ames Federal Employees Union (AFEU) ===
The Ames Federal Employees Union (AFEU), IFPTE Local 30, represents federal employees at NASA Ames.

=== Congressional Research Employees Association (CREA) ===
The Congressional Research Employees Association (CREA), IFPTE Local 75, represents over 500 employees at the Congressional Research Service.

=== Government Accountability Office (GAO) Employees Organization ===
The Government Accountability Office (GAO) Employees Organization, IFPTE Local 1921, represents analysts, specialists, and mission support employees at the United States Government Accountability Office.

=== Nonprofit Professional Employees Union (NPEU) ===
The Nonprofit Professional Employees Union (NPEU), IFPTE Local 70, represents employees of over 40 nonprofit organizations across the United States, including the American Civil Liberties Union (ACLU), Food & Water Watch, J Street, and the National Women's Law Center.

=== Society of Professional Engineering Employees in Aerospace (SPEEA) ===
The Society of Professional Engineering Employees in Aerospace (SPEEA), IFPTE Local 2001, represents over 17,000 aerospace engineers, technical workers, pilots, and professionals across Washington, Kansas, Oregon, Utah and California.
