= South Bay Labor Council =

Labor council in California, US

- Founded: July 9, 1958
- Headquarters: San Jose, California
- Location: United States
- Members: 100,000
- Key people: Cindy Chavez, Phaedra Ellis-Lamkins, Amy B. Dean, Jean F. Cohen
- Affiliations: AFL–CIO
- Website: www.southbaylabor.org

The South Bay Labor Council, AFL–CIO (SBLC), is the labor council of Santa Clara and San Benito counties in California's Bay Area. The SBLC is affiliated with the AFL–CIO, one of the national labor confederations of the United States. The SBLC represents over 100,000 men and women of 101 unions in Silicon Valley.

The progressive think-tank Working Partnerships, USA began as the policy arm of the SBLC, but has since separated and become an independent organization. The South Bay Labor Council runs one of the largest organizational campaign operations in Northern California.

== History ==
In the late 1930s Santa Clara County's trade unions wrestled with the AFL-West for control of the then existing central labor council. Twice, in 1938 and 1939, the council had its charter revoked after electing leaders disapproved of by the national organization. The South Bay Labor Council in its current form was chartered in 1958 as the Central Labor Council of Santa Clara County.

In 1987 council Executive Director Rick Sawyer persuaded then mayor Tom McEnery to negotiate an organizing agreement at the newly opened Fairmont Hotel in downtown San Jose. The agreement led to the unionization of every major hotel in downtown San Jose by UniteHERE Local 19, and to a prevailing wage commitment for city contracts above $50,000.

In 1994 Amy B. Dean was appointed CEO of the council. In 1995 Dean founded Working Partnerships, USA, a 501(c)(3) organization dedicated to policy research advocacy and community coalition building. With Working Partnerships, USA's research assistance, the SBLC was able to push through City Council legislation that put conditions on a Santa Clara County tax rebate program, including a written commitment to job creation listing the numbers of jobs planned to be created with tax dollars. The terms led to the disuse of the rebate program. In 1998, with research assistance from Working Partnerships, USA, and organizing assistance from local churches, the SBLC was able to push the San Jose City Council to pass what was at that time the highest living-wage ordinance in the country for municipal employees and city contractors. The SBLC's political influence in the city also grew that year with the election of Education and Outreach Director Cindy Chavez to the San Jose City Council.

In 2000 the SBLC authored and spearheaded a campaign to establish universal child healthcare in San Jose. After the plan failed in City Council, the Santa Clara County Board of Supervisors offered the necessary funding. In 2001 SBLC succeeded in winning 5,000 units of affordable housing in a Coyote Valley development project. In 2003 the SBLC negotiated a community benefits agreement with the CIM Group over a downtown San Jose development project. That year Dean left the council, and deputy director Phaedra Ellis-Lamkins became executive director. In 2006 Chavez left City Council for a failed mayoral bid. After Lamkins left the SBLC in 2009 Chavez was appointed executive director of the labor council. In 2013 Chavez left the SBLC after winning office in the Santa Clara County Board of Supervisors. The current executive officer of the SBLC is Jean Cohen.

== Access to Hours Initiative ==
In 2016, after the success and regional expansion of the 2012 minimum wage campaign, the South Bay Labor Council launched a new effort to lift the floor for the working class. The Labor Council led the campaign to pass San Jose's Measure E, which requires companies to offer hours to their current part-time qualified workforce before hiring new staff. With only two jurisdiction with similar, but much smaller in scope, ordinances - this was the first initiative of its kind. The Measure passed with nearly 64% of the vote and the law will go into effect in early 2016. The Labor Council led a large and sophisticated grass roots campaign with thousands of volunteers working to help pass the measure. After the passage of the measure, a statewide bill was introduced in the California State Assembly to enact a similar law statewide.

== Children's Health Initiative ==
Under Dean's leadership the SBLC in 2000 authored the Children's Health Initiative, a plan to expand Medi-Cal service to offer universal healthcare to children in San Jose. With Chavez on the Council, the plan initially had majority support. The plan depended on $2 million from the city in order to qualify for matching federal and state funds, but Mayor Gonzales managed to withhold the funds after offering $2.3 million in project funding to Councilwoman Pat Dando, who reversed her vote. After the initiative failed in City Council, the Santa Clara County Board of Supervisors offered the starting funds, and the program began the next year. After the plan began, the mayor and City Council reversed the earlier position and committed $3 million to fund the program. The Children's Health Initiative extended coverage to 70,000 children, guaranteeing health insurance to an estimated 360,000 San Joseans below the age of 18. The number of uninsured children shrank from 16 percent to 4 percent in ten years.

== See also ==
- San Jose Chamber of Commerce
