= Chuck Reed =

American politician (born 1948)

Charles R. Reed
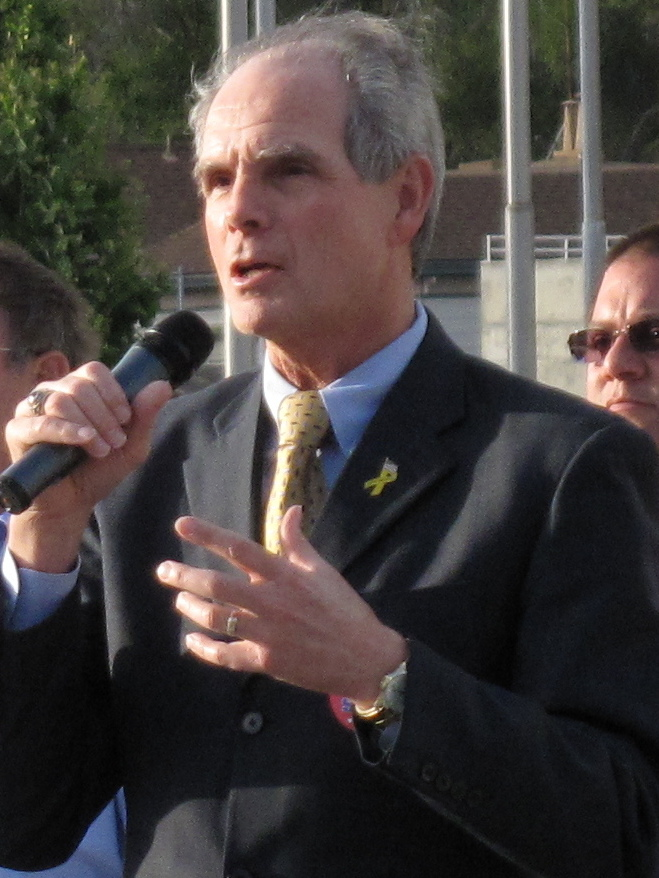

64th Mayor of San Jose
- In office January 9, 2007 – January 1, 2015
- Preceded by: Ron Gonzales
- Succeeded by: Sam Liccardo

San Jose City Council member for District 4
- In office 2001–2007

Personal details
- Born: August 15, 1948 (age 78) Garden City, Kansas, U.S.
- Party: Democratic
- Spouse: Paula Reed
- Children: Kim Reed-Campbell; Alex Reed
- Education: United States Air Force Academy; Princeton University (M.P.A.); Stanford Law School (J.D.)
- Profession: Environmental Attorney; USAF officer

Military service
- Allegiance: United States
- Branch/service: United States Air Force
- Years of service: 1970–1975
- Rank: Captain
- Battles/wars: Vietnam War

Charles Rufus Reed (born August 15, 1948) is an American politician and lawyer who served as the 64th mayor of San Jose, California from 2007 to 2015.

== Biography ==
=== Early life ===
Reed was born in Garden City, Kansas. Reed attended Garden City High School and helped the school win a state championship in basketball in 1966. He joined the United States Air Force in 1970 after attending the United States Air Force Academy. At the Academy, he graduated number one in his class and served as cadet wing commander, the highest position a USAFA cadet can achieve. Reed was only the 9th person in the history of the United States Air Force Academy to max out (top score) on the Physical Fitness Test.

While in the Air Force, Reed attended Princeton University and received a master's degree in Public Affairs. Later, during the Vietnam War, he served in Thailand. He left the Air Force in 1975, having reached the rank of captain, and attended Stanford Law School where he earned a J.D. degree in 1978.

After passing the bar, Reed moved to San Jose and began work as a private attorney. He specialized in environmental, employment, land use and real estate law, and commercial litigation.

=== Family ===
Reed is married with two children. His daughter, Colonel Kim Campbell, joined the Air Force and was also number one in her class at the Air Force Academy. Reed and his daughter were the first father and daughter to both graduate from the United States Air Force Academy and become Cadet Wing Commanders. Kim flew combat missions in an A-10 Warthog over Baghdad during the 2003 invasion of Iraq and swore him into office at his inauguration. His son, Alex, is a graduate of Santa Clara University.

== Political career ==
=== Early political career ===
Starting in the 1980s and continuing to 2000, Reed served on numerous commissions, boards, and committees including the City Planning Commission and the San Jose Downtown Association.

=== San Jose City Council ===
Reed was elected to a seat on the San Jose City Council from the Berryessa District (District 4) in 2000. He ran again in 2004 and was re-elected with 86% of all the votes cast. While on the San Jose City Council, Reed was known for often being the lone dissenter in many votes. He was thought to be the most outspoken critic of the status quo on the council and voted against many noteworthy agenda items.

=== Mayoral election 2006 ===
In 2005, with the incumbent mayor, Ron Gonzales, term-limited out, Reed announced his plan to run for Mayor of San Jose. In the mayoral primary held on June 6, 2006, in a crowded field of ten candidates, Reed won 28.8% of the vote, putting him in the mayoral run-off election held on November 7, 2006 against San Jose Vice-Mayor Cindy Chavez who received 23.17% of the vote. Michael Mulcahy received 10.74%, Dave Cortese received 16.37%, David Pandori received 17.86%.

In the mayoral runoff election held on November 7, 2006, Reed won a solid victory over Chavez who conceded the race just before midnight. Final tallies show Reed garnered 117,394 votes to Chavez's 80,720 (in percentage terms 59.26% to 40.74%).

During the Mayoral campaign, Reed was criticized in a series of attack ads by Chavez and Labor Unions for getting reimbursed for various expenses that he had as a council member from his office fund. He repaid the funds when the issue hit the media and apologized to the public for any sense of wrongdoing. The funds in question were all approved by the City Clerk's Office and in an October 2006 City Council meeting, City Clerk, Lee Price, stated that the reimbursements did not violate City law and was common practice among the City Council offices. Regardless, early in his administration, Reed had the City Clerk's Office produce a more detailed explanation for approved uses and restricted uses.

Reed put together a 67-member transition committee to aide his transition staff in policy issues. Assisted by Transition Team Co-Chairs former San Jose Mayor Tom McEnery and Victor Ajlouny, Reed hosted publicly held meetings where many policy issues were discussed. The subcommittees for the transition included Jobs & the Economy, Environment, Education, Public Safety, and Government Reform and Ethics.

== Mayor of San Jose ==
Reed was inaugurated as the 64th Mayor of San Jose on Tuesday, January 9, 2007. At his inauguration, he promised "no lying, no cheating, no stealing." This added mantra was derived from the Air Force Academy oath. Reed immediately pushed many of his 34 Reed Reforms, including focusing on outreach efforts to get the community involved in the budget process.

Chuck Reed has gained many nicknames during his tenure in office including "Mr. Integrity", "the Anti-Ron Gonzales", and "Captain America" due to his habit of sporting the American Flag. On October 11, 2007 at a meeting with more than 100 Silicon Valley CEOs, Governor Arnold Schwarzenegger referred to Reed as the "Green Mayor" because of Reed's environmental priorities.

=== San Jose's Green Vision ===
Mayor Reed announced his Green Vision for San Jose in October 2007. The Green Vision is a comprehensive environmental guide for San Jose over the next 15 years, setting 10 goals. The Green Vision was adopted by the San Jose City Council on October 30, 2007 in an 11–0 vote. Mayor Reed aims to bring 25,000 clean tech jobs to San Jose and attracted Tesla Motors and several solar power companies to the city in 2008. He attributes his progress so far to "moving at the speed of business" and streamlining procedures. One city approval process (special tenant improvements) was reduced from 3–6 months to one hour."

=== 2010 re-election ===
Mayor Reed launched his bid for re-election on December 10, 2009. He pledged to keep positioning the city as a center of "clean tech" innovation. Reed was re-elected to a second term in a landslide on June 8, 2010. Reed won the election with 70,088 votes, or 76.7%, against three challengers. His nearest opponent, Thomas Nguyen, placed second with just 9,016. Susan Barragan placed third with 7,573 votes, while Bill Chew came in fourth place with 4,752 votes.

== See also ==
- List of mayors of the largest 50 US cities

Political offices
Preceded by Ron Gonzales	Mayor of San Jose, California; 2007–2015	Succeeded by Sam Liccardo
