= 2020 Santa Clara County Board of Supervisors election =

Local election in California

- March 3 (primary); November 3 (runoff)

3 of the 5 seats of the Santa Clara County Board of Supervisors

The 2020 Santa Clara County Board of Supervisors election were held on March 3, 2020, to elect two of the five seats of the Santa Clara County Board of Supervisors, with runoffs held on November 3, 2020. Runoffs only occurred if no candidate received more than 50% of the votes cast in the contest. Local elections in California are officially nonpartisan. The Santa Clara County Board of Supervisors is the governing body for Santa Clara County. Each supervisor is elected to a 4-year term, with each supervisor capped at 3 consecutive terms in office.

== District 2 ==
Incumbent Cindy Chavez was initially elected to the 2nd district in a 2013 special election runoff, and subsequently elected in 2016. She was eligible to run for reelection.

=== Endorsements ===
Cindy Chavez

Political party organizations

- Santa Clara County Democratic Party

Labor unions

- UA Local 393

=== Results ===
2020 Santa Clara County Board of Supervisors 2nd district election
Primary election
Candidate	Votes	%
Cindy Chavez (incumbent)	34,664	65.7
Jennifer M. Celaya	10,871	20.6
Anthony Macias	7,201	13.7
Total votes	52,736	100.0

== District 3 ==
Incumbent Dave Cortese was elected to the 3rd district in 2008, 2012, and 2016. He was ineligible for reelection.

=== Endorsements ===
Kansen Chu

Labor unions

- AFL-CIO South Bay Labor Council (co-endorsement)
- IFPTE Local 21 (primary election)
- San Jose Police Officers Association
- Santa Clara County Firefighters IAFF Local 1165
- UA Local 393 (co-endorsement)
- United Farm Workers

Individuals

- Sylvia Arenas, member of the San Jose City Council
- Magdalena Carrasco, member of the San Jose City Council
- Maya Esparza, member of the San Jose City Council
- Ro Khanna, U.S. Representative from CA-17
- Raul Peralez, member of the San Jose City Council
- Bernie Sanders, U.S. Senator from Vermont
Otto Lee

Political party organizations

- Santa Clara County Democratic Party (co-endorsement)
- Silicon Valley Democratic Socialists of America (co-endorsement)

Organizations

- Bay Area Municipal Elections Committee (co-endorsement)
- Dean Democratic Club of Silicon Valley
- Santa Clara County Association of Realtors
- Santa Clara County League of Conservation Voters
- Silicon Valley Young Democrats
- South Bay YIMBY
- The Silicon Valley Organization

Labor unions

- East Side Teachers Association
- IFPTE Local 21 (runoff election)
- SEIU Local 521
- AFL-CIO South Bay Labor Council (co-endorsement)
- Teamsters Local 856
- Teamsters Joint Council 7 (co-endorsement)
- UA Local 393 (co-endorsement)

Individuals

- Susan Ellenberg, member of the Santa Clara County Board of Supervisors
- Anna Eshoo, U.S. Representative from CA-16
Magdalena Carrasco

Political party organizations

- Santa Clara County Democratic Party (co-endorsement)
- Silicon Valley Democratic Socialists of America (co-endorsement)

Organizations

- Bay Area Municipal Elections Committee (co-endorsement)

Labor unions

- UA Local 393 (co-endorsement)
- IFPTE Local 21 (primary election)
- Teamsters Joint Council 7 (co-endorsement)

Individuals

- Jim Beall, state senator from SD-15
- Cindy Chavez, member of the Santa Clara County Board of Supervisors
- Kevin de León, former member of the California State Legislature
- Ash Kalra, assemblymember from AD-27
- Bob Wieckowski, state senator from SD-10

=== Results ===
2020 Santa Clara County Board of Supervisors 3rd district election
Primary election
Candidate	Votes	%
Kansen Chu	24,557	31.5
Otto Lee	22,560	29.0
Magdalena Carrasco	20,227	26.0
John Leyba	10,548	13.5
Total votes	77,892	100.0
General election
Otto Lee	85,663	60.5
Kansen Chu	55,946	39.5
Total votes	141,609	100.0

== District 5 ==
Incumbent Joe Simitian was elected to the 5th district in 2012 and 2016. He was eligible for reelection.

=== Endorsements ===
Joe Simitian

Organizations

- Sierra Club Loma Prieta Chapter

=== Results ===
2020 Santa Clara County Board of Supervisors 5th district election
Primary election
Candidate	Votes	%
Joe Simitian (incumbent)	85,322	100.0
Total votes	85,322	100.0
