= 2024 Santa Clara County Board of Supervisors election =

Local election in California

- March 5 (primary); November 5 (runoff)

3 of the 5 seats of the Santa Clara County Board of Supervisors

The 2024 Santa Clara County Board of Supervisors election were held on March 5, 2024, to elect two of the five seats of the Santa Clara County Board of Supervisors, with runoffs held on November 5, 2024. Runoffs only occurred if no candidate received more than 50% of the votes cast in the contest. Local elections in California are officially nonpartisan. The Santa Clara County Board of Supervisors is the governing body for Santa Clara County. Each supervisor is elected to a 4-year term, with each supervisor capped at 3 consecutive terms in office.

== District 2 ==
Incumbent Cindy Chavez was initially elected to the 2nd district in a 2013 special election runoff, and subsequently elected in 2016 and 2020. She was ineligible to run for reelection.

=== Endorsements ===
Betty Duong

Organizations

- Bay Area Municipal Elections Committee (BAYMEC)
- County Employees Management Association
- Dean Democratic Club of Silicon Valley
- Democratic Activists for Women Now (DAWN)
- East Valley Democratic Club
- Elect Good People
- Housing Action Coalition (HAC)
- Planned Parenthood Advocates Mar Monte
- Progressive Vietnamese American Organization
- Santa Clara County League of Conservation Voters
- Silicon Valley Asian Pacific American Democratic Club
- Silicon Valley Young Democrats
- South Bay Progressive Alliance

Individuals

- Jim Beall, former state legislator

Labor unions

- AFL-CIO South Bay Labor Council
- IFPTE Local 21
- San Jose Police Officers' Association
- SEIU Committee of Interns and Residents
- SEIU Local 2015
- SEIU Local 521
- Sheet Metal Workers’ Local 104
- Teamsters Joint Council 7

Political party organizations

- Santa Clara County Democratic Party
- Working Families Party
Madison Nguyen

Individuals

- Matt Mahan, current mayor of San Jose
- Chuck Reed, former mayor of San Jose
- Ron Gonzales, former mayor of San Jose
- Don Gage, former mayor of Gilroy and former supervisor of Santa Clara County

Organizations

- Democrats at San Jose State
- Gun Sense Voter

=== Results ===
2024 Santa Clara County Board of Supervisors 2nd district election
Primary election
Candidate	Votes	%
Betty Duong	14,031	31.8
Madison Nguyen	12,794	29.0
Corina Herrera-Loera	10,519	23.9
Nelson McElmurry	4,321	9.8
Jennifer Margaret Celaya	2,394	5.4
Total votes	44,059	100.0
General election
Betty Duong	52,584	53.4
Madison Nguyen	45,894	46.6
Total votes	98,481	100.0

== District 3 ==
Incumbent Otto Lee was elected to the 3rd district in 2020 in a runoff with 60.5% of the vote. He was eligible to run for reelection.

=== Endorsements ===
Otto Lee

Organizations

- County Employees Management Association
- Housing Action Coalition (HAC)
- Sierra Club Loma Prieta Chapter

Labor unions

- SEIU Local 521
- Teamsters Joint Council 7

=== Results ===
2024 Santa Clara County Board of Supervisors 4th district election
Primary election
Candidate	Votes	%
Otto Lee (incumbent)	42,549	100.0
Total votes	42,549	100.0

== District 5 ==
Incumbent Joe Simitian was elected to the 5th district in 2012, 2016, and 2020. He was ineligible for reelection.

=== Endorsements ===
Margaret Abe-Koga

Organizations

- 350 Bay Area Action
- California Apartment Association
- County Employees Management Association
- Cupertino for All
- Democratic Activists for Women Now (DAWN) (dual endorsement)
- Democrats at San Jose State
- Fund Her
- Gun Sense Voter (dual endorsement)
- Santa Clara County League of Conservation Voters
- Silicon Valley Asian Pacific American Democratic Club

Labor unions

- AFL-CIO South Bay Labor Council (dual endorsement)
- IFPTE Local 21
- San Jose Police Officers' Association
- SEIU Local 2015
- SEIU Local 521 (dual endorsement)
- Sheet Metal Workers’ Local 104
- Teamsters Joint Council 7

Political party organizations

- Santa Clara County Democratic Party (dual endorsement)

Individuals

- Susan Ellenberg, supervisor of Santa Clara County
Sally Lieber

Organizations

- California Democratic Renters' Council
- California Women's List
- Courage California
- Dean Democratic Club of Silicon Valley
- Democratic Activists for Women Now (DAWN) (dual endorsement)
- Gun Sense Voter (dual endorsement)
- South Bay Progressive Alliance
- South Bay YIMBY

Labor unions

- AFL-CIO South Bay Labor Council (dual endorsement)
- SEIU Committee of Interns and Residents
- SEIU Local 521 (dual endorsement)

Political party organizations

- Silicon Valley Democratic Socialists of America
- Central City Democrats
- Santa Clara County Democratic Party (dual endorsement)
- Working Families Party

Individuals

- Domingo Candelas, member of the San Jose City Council
- Peter Ortiz, member of the San Jose City Council
- Lenny Siegel, former Mountain View mayor
- Tony Thurmond, the California State Superintendent of Public Instruction
Peter C. Fung

Organizations

- The Lincoln Club of Northern California

=== Results ===
2024 Santa Clara County Board of Supervisors 5th district election
Primary election
Candidate	Votes	%
Margaret Abe-Koga	37,172	41.9
Sally Lieber	21,962	24.8
Peter C. Fung	17,892	20.2
Barry Chang	6,164	6.9
Sandy Sans	5,522	6.2
Total votes	88,712	100.0
General election
Margaret Abe-Koga	82,490	57.1
Sally Lieber	61,937	42.9
Total votes	144,427	100.0
