= 2018 Santa Clara County Board of Supervisors election =

Local election in California

- June 5 (primary); November 6 (runoff)

2 of the 5 seats of the Santa Clara County Board of Supervisors

The 2018 Santa Clara County Board of Supervisors election were held on June 5, 2018, to elect two of the five seats of the Santa Clara County Board of Supervisors, with runoffs held on November 6, 2018. Runoffs only occurred if no candidate received more than 50% of the votes cast in the contest. Local elections in California are officially nonpartisan. The Santa Clara County Board of Supervisors is the governing body for Santa Clara County. Each supervisor is elected to a 4-year term, with each supervisor capped at 3 consecutive terms in office.

== District 1 ==
Incumbent Mike Wasserman was elected to the 1st district in 2010 and 2014. He was eligible for reelection.

=== Endorsements ===
Mike Wasserman

Organizations

- Bay Area Municipal Elections Committee

=== Results ===
2018 Santa Clara County Board of Supervisors 1st district election
Primary election
Candidate	Votes	%
Mike Wasserman (incumbent)	57,120	100.0
Total votes	57,120	100.0

== District 4 ==
Incumbent Ken Yeager was elected to the 4th district in 2006, 2010, and 2014. He was ineligible for reelection.

=== Endorsements ===
Susan Ellenberg

Organizations

- Bay Area Municipal Elections Committee (dual endorsement)
- Dean Democratic Club of Silicon Valley
- Santa Clara County League of Conservation Voters (dual endorsement)
- Sierra Club Loma Prieta Chapter (dual endorsement)

Political party organizations

- Santa Clara County Democratic Party (dual endorsement)

Individuals

- Ken Yeager (dual endorsement)
Don Rocha

Organizations

- Bay Area Municipal Elections Committee (dual endorsement)
- Santa Clara County League of Conservation Voters (dual endorsement)
- Sierra Club Loma Prieta Chapter (dual endorsement)

Political party organizations

- Santa Clara County Democratic Party (dual endorsement)

Labor unions

- AFL-CIO South Bay Labor Council (co-endorsement)
- IFPTE Local 21

Individuals

- Ken Yeager (dual endorsement)
Dominic Caserta
- AFL-CIO South Bay Labor Council (co-endorsement)
Pierluigi Oliverio

Organizations

- Silicon Valley Organization

=== Results ===
2018 Santa Clara County Board of Supervisors 4th district election
Primary election
Candidate	Votes	%
Susan Ellenberg	22,803	33.3
Don Rocha	14,135	20.7
Pierluigi Oliverio	13,328	19.5
Jason Baker	7,934	11.6
Dominic Caserta	4,442	6.5
Mike Alvarado	3,481	5.1
Maria Hernandez	2,269	3.3
Total votes	68,392	100.0
General election
Susan Ellenberg	65,227	59.2
Don Rocha	44,942	40.8
Total votes	110,169	100.0
