= 2012 Santa Clara County Board of Supervisors election =

Local election in California

- June 5 (primary)

3 of the 5 seats of the Santa Clara County Board of Supervisors

The 2012 Santa Clara County Board of Supervisors election were held on June 5, 2012, to elect three of the five seats of the Santa Clara County Board of Supervisors. Runoffs would occur if no candidate received more than 50% of the votes cast in the contest, but no runoff was held since every primary contest had a candidate receive more than 50%. Local elections in California are officially nonpartisan. The Santa Clara County Board of Supervisors is the governing body for Santa Clara County. Each supervisor is elected to a 4-year term, with each supervisor capped at 3 consecutive terms in office.

== District 2 ==
Incumbent George Shirakawa, Jr. was elected to the 2nd district in 2008 in the runoff with 53.8% of the vote. He was eligible for reelection.

=== Results ===
2012 Santa Clara County Board of Supervisors 2nd district election
Primary election
Candidate	Votes	%
George Shirakawa, Jr. (incumbent)	24,950	100.0
Total votes	24,950	100.0

== District 3 ==
Incumbent Dave Cortese was elected to the 3rd district in 2008 in the runoff with 54.9% of the vote. He was eligible for reelection.

=== Results ===
2012 Santa Clara County Board of Supervisors 3rd district election
Primary election
Candidate	Votes	%
Dave Cortese (incumbent)	40,360	100.0
Total votes	40,360	100.0

== District 5 ==
Incumbent Liz Kniss was elected to the 5th district in 2000, 2004, and 2008. She was ineligible for reelection.

=== Endorsements ===
Joe Simitian

Organizations

- Santa Clara County League of Conservation Voters
- Sierra Club Loma Prieta Chapter

Newspapers

- San Jose Inside

=== Results ===
2012 Santa Clara County Board of Supervisors 5th district election
Primary election
Candidate	Votes	%
Joe Simitian	39,131	58.3
Kris Huyilan Wang	15,367	22.9
Barry Chang	12,654	18.8
Total votes	67,152	100.0
