= 2008 Santa Clara County Board of Supervisors election =

Local election in California

- June 3 (primary); November 4 (runoff)

3 of the 5 seats of the Santa Clara County Board of Supervisors

The 2008 Santa Clara County Board of Supervisors election were held on June 3, 2008, to elect three of the five seats of the Santa Clara County Board of Supervisors, with runoffs held on November 4, 2008. Runoffs only occurred if no candidate received more than 50% of the votes cast in the contest. Local elections in California are officially nonpartisan. The Santa Clara County Board of Supervisors is the governing body for Santa Clara County. Each supervisor is elected to a 4-year term, with each supervisor capped at 3 consecutive terms in office.

== District 2 ==
Incumbent Blanca Alvarado was initially appointed to the 2nd district in 1995 to fill the vacancy left by Zoe Lofgren after she was elected to the U.S. House of Representatives. She was subsequently reelected to the 2nd district in 1996, 2000, and 2004. She was ineligible for reelection.

=== Endorsements ===
Richard Hobbs

Organizations

- Santa Clara County League of Conservation Voters

=== Results ===
2008 Santa Clara County Board of Supervisors 2nd district election
Primary election
Candidate	Votes	%
George Shirakawa, Jr.	9,430	35.4
Richard Hobbs	8,878	33.3
Patricia Martinez-Roach	3,773	14.2
Frank Chavez	2,399	9.0
Richard L. Lopez	1,200	4.5
Andrew Abraham Diaz	941	3.5
Total votes	26,621	100.0
General election
George Shirakawa, Jr.	40,253	53.8
Richard Hobbs	34,521	46.2
Total votes	74,774	100.0

== District 3 ==
Incumbent Peter "Primo" McHugh was elected to the 3rd district in 1996, 2000, and 2004. He was ineligible for reelection.

=== Endorsements ===
Dave Cortese

Organizations

- Santa Clara County League of Conservation Voters
Otto Lee

Individuals

- Anna Eshoo, CD-14
- Jose Esteves, mayor of Milpitas (runoff election)
- Mike Honda, CD-15
- Ellen Tauscher, CD-10

Organizations

- Milpitas Police Officer’s Association
- Sunnyvale Public Safety Officer’s Association

=== Results ===
2008 Santa Clara County Board of Supervisors 2nd district election
Primary election
Candidate	Votes	%
Dave Cortese	17,813	42.0
Otto Lee	13,280	31.3
Jose Esteves	11,303	26.7
Total votes	42,396	100.0
General election
Dave Cortese	56,845	54.9
Otto Lee	46,751	45.1
Total votes	103,596	100.0

== District 5 ==
Incumbent Liz Kniss was elected to the 5th district in 2000 and 2004. She was eligible for reelection.

=== Endorsements ===
Liz Kniss

Individuals

- Anna Eshoo, CD-14
- Sally Lieber, AD-22

=== Results ===
2008 Santa Clara County Board of Supervisors 2nd district election
Primary election
Candidate	Votes	%
Liz Kniss (incumbent)	51,502	100.0
Total votes	51,502	100.0
