= 2026 Santa Clara County Board of Supervisors election =

Local election in California

- June 2 (primary)

2 of the 5 seats of the Santa Clara County Board of Supervisors

The 2026 Santa Clara County Board of Supervisors election was held on June 2, 2026, to elect two of the five seats of the Santa Clara County Board of Supervisors. Runoffs would occur if no candidate received more than 50% of the votes cast in the contest, but runoffs are not scheduled for these elections since neither election had more than 2 candidates. Local elections in California are officially nonpartisan. The Santa Clara County Board of Supervisors is the governing body for Santa Clara County. Each supervisor is elected to a 4-year term, with each supervisor capped at 3 consecutive terms in office.

== District 1 ==
District 1 currently encompasses South County and parts of southern San Jose, including Evergreen Valley. Incumbent Sylvia Arenas was elected to the 1st district in 2022 in a runoff with 54.4% of the vote. She is eligible for reelection.

=== Candidates ===
Two candidates have qualified for the ballot:

- Rebecca Munson, member of the Morgan Hill Unified Board of Education
- Sylvia Arenas, incumbent supervisor for the Santa Clara County Board of Supervisors

=== Endorsements ===
Rebecca Munson

Labor unions

- CAL FIRE Firefighters Local 2881

Individuals

- Mark Turner, Morgan Hill mayor
Sylvia Arenas

Labor unions

- IBEW Local 332
- SEIU Local 521
- South Bay Labor Council

Political party chapters

- Santa Clara County Democratic Party

Individuals

- Dave Cortese, state senator from the 15th district
- John Horner, Morgan Hill Union School District president
- Jimmy Panetta, U.S. representative from the 19th district
- Gail Pellerin, state assemblymember from the 28th district

Organizations

- Democratic Activists for Women Now (DAWN)
- Planned Parenthood Advocates Mar Monte

=== Results ===
2026 Santa Clara County Board of Supervisors 1st district election
Primary election
Candidate	Votes	%
Sylvia Arenas (incumbent)	49,788	63.7
Rebecca Munson	28,431	36.3
Total votes	78,219	100.0

== District 4 ==
District 4 currently encompasses Campbell, Santa Clara, and western San Jose. Incumbent Susan Ellenberg was elected to the 4th district in 2018 and 2022. She is eligible for reelection.

=== Candidates ===
One candidate has qualified for the ballot:

- Susan Ellenberg, incumbent supervisor for the Santa Clara County Board of Supervisors

=== Endorsements ===
Susan Ellenberg

Labor unions

- IBEW Local 332
- SEIU Local 521
- SEIU Local 1021
- South Bay Labor Council

Political party chapters

- Santa Clara County Democratic Party

Organizations

- Dean Democratic Club of Silicon Valley

=== Results ===
2026 Santa Clara County Board of Supervisors 4th district election
Primary election
Candidate	Votes	%
Susan Ellenberg (incumbent)	59,282	100.0
Total votes	59,282	100.0
