= 2010 Santa Clara County Board of Supervisors election =

Local election in California

- June 8 (primary); November 2 (runoff)

2 of the 5 seats of the Santa Clara County Board of Supervisors

The 2010 Santa Clara County Board of Supervisors election were held on June 8, 2010, to elect two of the five seats of the Santa Clara County Board of Supervisors, with runoffs held on November 2, 2010. Runoffs only occurred if no candidate received more than 50% of the votes cast in the contest. Local elections in California are officially nonpartisan. The Santa Clara County Board of Supervisors is the governing body for Santa Clara County. Each supervisor is elected to a 4-year term, with each supervisor capped at 3 consecutive terms in office.

== District 1 ==
Incumbent Don Gage was elected to the 1st district in 1998, 2002, and 2006. He was ineligible for reelection.

=== Endorsements ===
Teresa Alvarado

Organizations

- Santa Clara County League of Conservation Voters

Individuals

- Susan Hammer, former mayor of San Jose
- Ash Kalra, member of the San Jose City Council from the 2nd district
- Liz Kniss, member of the Santa Clara County Board of Supervisors from the 5th district
- Sam Liccardo, member of the San Jose City Council from the 3rd district
- Karyn Sinunu-Towery, assistant district attorney (primary election)
- Larry Stone, Santa Clara County Assessor (primary election)

Newspapers

- San Jose Inside (primary election)
- The Morgan Hill Times (primary election)
Forrest Williams

Individuals

- Elaine Alquist, member of the California State Senate from the 13th district
- Cindy Chavez, former member of the San Jose City Council from the 3rd district
- Kansen Chu, member of the San Jose City Council from the 4th district
- George Shirakawa, Jr., member of the Santa Clara County Board of Supervisors from the 2nd district
Mike Wasserman

Individuals

- Don Gage, retiring member of the Santa Clara County Board of Supervisors from the 1st district
- Norm Kline, former mayor of Saratoga
- Karyn Sinunu-Towery, assistant district attorney (runoff election)
- Larry Stone, Santa Clara County Assessor (runoff election)

Newspapers

- San Jose Inside (runoff election)
- The Morgan Hill Times (runoff election)

=== Results ===
2010 Santa Clara County Board of Supervisors 1st district election
Primary election
Candidate	Votes	%
Mike Wasserman	26,206	42.4
Forrest Williams	11,886	19.3
Teresa Alvarado	11,824	19.2
Tom Kruse	6,856	11.1
Peter Arellano	4,966	8.0
Total votes	61,738	100.0
General election
Mike Wasserman	52,158	57.5
Forrest Williams	38,509	42.5
Total votes	90,667	100.0

== District 4 ==
Incumbent Ken Yeager was elected to the 4th district in 2006 in the primary with 52.1% of the vote. He was eligible for reelection.

=== Results ===
2010 Santa Clara County Board of Supervisors 4th district election
Primary election
Candidate	Votes	%
Ken Yeager (incumbent)	50,492	100.0
Total votes	50,492	100.0
