= 2016 Santa Clara County Board of Supervisors election =

Local election in California

- June 7 (primary)

3 of the 5 seats of the Santa Clara County Board of Supervisors

The 2016 Santa Clara County Board of Supervisors election were held on June 7, 2016, to elect three of the five seats of the Santa Clara County Board of Supervisors. Runoffs would occur if no candidate received more than 50% of the votes cast in the contest, but no runoff was held since none of the contests fielded more than two candidates. Local elections in California are officially nonpartisan. The Santa Clara County Board of Supervisors is the governing body for Santa Clara County. Each supervisor is elected to a 4-year term, with each supervisor capped at 3 consecutive terms in office.

== District 2 ==
George Shirakawa, Jr. was elected to the 2nd district in 2008 and 2012. In 2013, Shirakawa was charged related to misuse of public funds and resigned from office. Incumbent Cindy Chavez was elected in a special election runoff in 2013 with 55.5% of the vote. She was eligible for reelection.

=== Endorsements ===
Cindy Chavez

Organizations

- Dean Democratic Club of Silicon Valley
- Silicon Valley Young Democrats

Labor unions

- IFPTE Local 21
- UA Local 393

=== Results ===
2016 Santa Clara County Board of Supervisors 2nd district election
Primary election
Candidate	Votes	%
Cindy Chavez (incumbent)	40,377	100.0
Total votes	40,377	100.0

== District 3 ==
Incumbent Dave Cortese was elected to the 3rd district in 2008 and 2012. He was eligible for reelection.

=== Endorsements ===
Dave Cortese

Organizations

- Silicon Valley Young Democrats

Labor unions

- IFPTE Local 21
- UA Local 393

=== Results ===
2016 Santa Clara County Board of Supervisors 3rd district election
Primary election
Candidate	Votes	%
Dave Cortese (incumbent)	57,088	100.0
Total votes	57,088	100.0

== District 5 ==
Incumbent Joe Simitian was elected to the 5th district in 2012 in the primary with 58.3% of the vote. He was eligible for reelection.

=== Endorsements ===
Joe Simitian

Organizations

- Dean Democratic Club of Silicon Valley
- Silicon Valley Young Democrats

Labor unions

- IFPTE Local 21
- UA Local 393

Newspapers

- Mountain View Voice
- Palo Alto Online

=== Results ===
2016 Santa Clara County Board of Supervisors 5th district election
Primary election
Candidate	Votes	%
Joe Simitian (incumbent)	71,383	89.4
John Mumy	8,464	10.6
Total votes	79,847	100.0
