= 2014 Santa Clara County Board of Supervisors election =

Local election in California

- June 3 (primary)

2 of the 5 seats of the Santa Clara County Board of Supervisors

The 2014 Santa Clara County Board of Supervisors election were held on June 3, 2014, to elect two of the five seats of the Santa Clara County Board of Supervisors. Runoffs would occur if no candidate received more than 50% of the votes cast in the contest, but no runoff was held since none of the contests fielded more than two candidates. Local elections in California are officially nonpartisan. The Santa Clara County Board of Supervisors is the governing body for Santa Clara County. Each supervisor is elected to a 4-year term, with each supervisor capped at 3 consecutive terms in office.

== District 1 ==
Incumbent Mike Wasserman was elected to the 1st district in 2010 in the runoff with 57.3% of the vote. He was eligible for reelection.

=== Results ===
2014 Santa Clara County Board of Supervisors 1st district election
Primary election
Candidate	Votes	%
Mike Wasserman (incumbent)	41,369	100.0
Total votes	41,369	100.0

== District 4 ==
Incumbent Ken Yeager was elected to the 4th district in 2006 and 2010. He was eligible for reelection.

=== Endorsements ===
Ken Yeager

Organizations

- Gay & Lesbian Victory Fund
- Sierra Club
- Silicon Valley Young Democrats

Labor unions

- SIEU Local 521

=== Results ===
2014 Santa Clara County Board of Supervisors 4th district election
Primary election
Candidate	Votes	%
Ken Yeager (incumbent)	41,191	100.0
Total votes	41,191	100.0
