= 2004 Santa Clara County Board of Supervisors election =

Local election in California

- March 2 (primary)

3 of the 5 seats of the Santa Clara County Board of Supervisors

The 2004 Santa Clara County Board of Supervisors election were held on March 2, 2004, to elect three of the five seats of the Santa Clara County Board of Supervisors. Runoffs would occur if no candidate received more than 50% of the votes cast in the contest, but no runoff was held since every primary contest had a candidate receive more than 50%. Local elections in California are officially nonpartisan. The Santa Clara County Board of Supervisors is the governing body for Santa Clara County. Each supervisor is elected to a 4-year term, with each supervisor capped at 3 consecutive terms in office.

== District 2 ==
Incumbent Blanca Alvarado was initially appointed to the 2nd district in 1995 to fill the vacancy left by Zoe Lofgren after she was elected to the U.S. House of Representatives. She was subsequently reelected to the 2nd district in 1996 and 2000. She was eligible for reelection.

=== Results ===
2004 Santa Clara County Board of Supervisors 2nd district election
Primary election
Candidate	Votes	%
Blanca Alvarado (incumbent)	27,677	100.0
Total votes	27,677	100.0

== District 3 ==
Incumbent Peter "Primo" McHugh was elected to the 3rd district in 1996 and 2000. He was eligible for reelection.

=== Results ===
2004 Santa Clara County Board of Supervisors 3rd district election
Primary election
Candidate	Votes	%
Pete "Primo" McHugh (incumbent)	35,148	100.0
Total votes	35,148	100.0

== District 5 ==
Incumbent Liz Kniss was elected to the 5th district in 2000 in the runoff with 51.2% of the vote. She was eligible for reelection.

=== Results ===
2004 Santa Clara County Board of Supervisors 5th district election
Primary election
Candidate	Votes	%
Liz Kniss (incumbent)	62,310	100.0
Total votes	62,310	100.0
