= 2022 Santa Clara County Board of Supervisors election =

- June 7 (primary); November 8 (runoff)

2 of the 5 seats of the Santa Clara County Board of Supervisors

The 2022 Santa Clara County Board of Supervisors election was held on June 7, 2022, to elect two of the five seats on the Board of Supervisors of Santa Clara County, with runoff elections occurring on November 8, 2022. District 1 was an open seat due to the terming out of Supervisor Mike Wasserman. The race was highly competitive and the first since the 2020 United States redistricting cycle which changed the boundaries of the district. District 4 was uncontested and incumbent Supervisor Susan Ellenberg was reelected.

== Background ==
Santa Clara County is the 18th largest county in the United States and the 6th largest in the state of California. All local elections in California are officially nonpartisan and use a top-two primary system; if no candidate receives a majority of the June 7, 2022 vote, a runoff was held between the top two candidates on November 8, 2022.

In the redistricting process, the boundaries of District 1 changed significantly; eventual victor Sylvia Arenas was drawn into the district, while candidates Johnny Khamis and Rob Rennie were drawn out. Khamis threatened legal action when the new district map was proposed, and after it was adopted, he moved into the new district boundaries to continue his campaign.

== District 1 ==
2022 Santa Clara County Board of Supervisors 1st district election

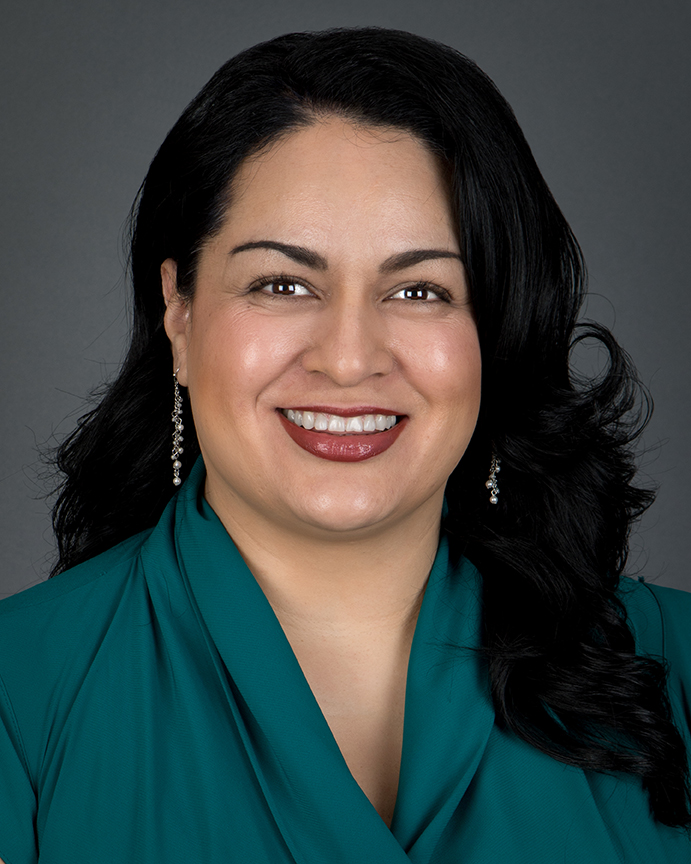

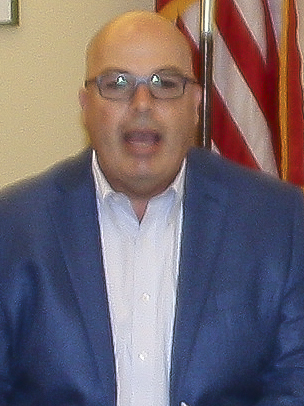

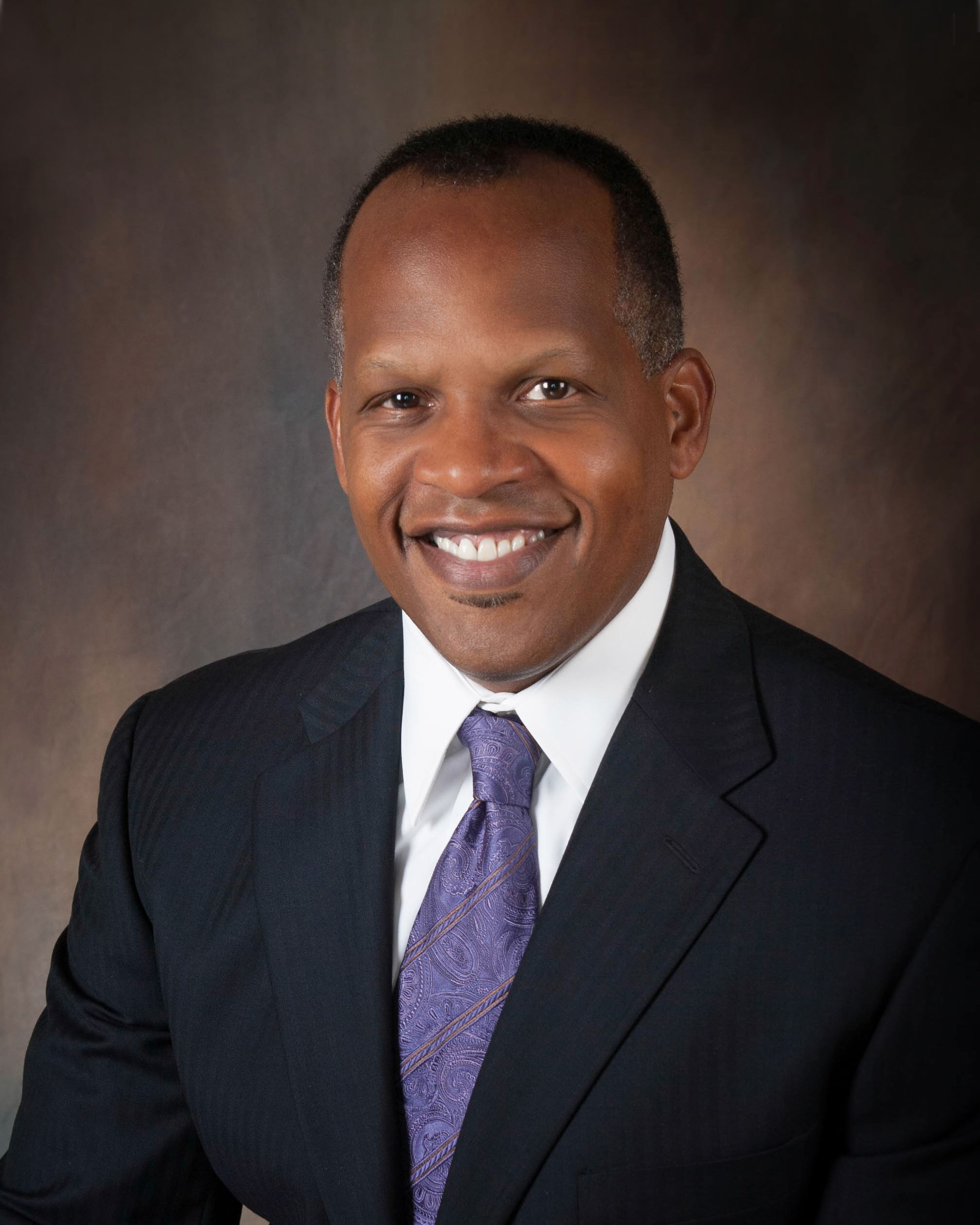

Candidate	Sylvia Arenas	Johnny Khamis	Claudia Rossi
First round	20,262; 28.62%	18,800; 26.56	13,824; 19.53
Runoff	59,526; 54.45%	49,800; 45.55%
Candidate	Rich Constantine	Denelle Fedor
First round	13,742; 19.41%	4,157; 5.87%
Supervisor before election
Mike Wasserman
Supervisor after election
Sylvia Arenas

=== Candidates ===
==== Advanced to general ====
- Sylvia Arenas, member of the San Jose City Council from the 8th district
- Johnny Khamis, former member of the San Jose City Council from the 10th district

==== Eliminated in primary ====
- Claudia Rossi, registered nurse and member of the Santa Clara County Board of Education
- Rich Constantine, Mayor of Morgan Hill
- Denelle Fedor, nonprofit case manager and former political staffer

==== Withdrew ====
- Rob Rennie, Vice Mayor of Los Gatos (drawn out of district during redistricting process; ran for state assembly)

=== Endorsements ===
Sylvia Arenas

Organizations

- Bay Area Municipal Elections Committee
- San Jose Police Officers' Association
- Santa Clara County League of Conservation Voters (runoff election)
- SEIU Local 521
- Silicon Valley Young Democrats
- South Bay YIMBY

Political party organizations

- Santa Clara County Democratic Party

Labor unions

- AFL-CIO South Bay Labor Council (dual endorsement)
- IBEW Local 332
- IFPTE Local 21 (dual endorsement)
- UA Local 393
Claudia Rossi

Labor unions

- AFL-CIO South Bay Labor Council (dual endorsement)
- IFPTE Local 21 (dual endorsement)
- National Nurses United

Individuals

- Jim Beall, former state senator from SD-15
- Dave Cortese, state senator from SD-15
- Susan Ellenberg, member of the Santa Clara County Board of Supervisors
- Otto Lee, member of the Santa Clara County Board of Supervisors

Organizations

- Santa Clara County League of Conservation Voters (primary election)
Johnny Khamis

Organizations

- Citizens for Fiscal Responsibility
- Santa Clara County Association of Realtors
- Silicon Valley's Association of Republican Women

Political party organizations

- Santa Clara County Republican Party

=== Results ===
2022 Santa Clara County Board of Supervisors 1st district election
Primary election
Candidate	Votes	%
Sylvia Arenas	20,262	28.62
Johnny Khamis	18,800	26.56
Claudia Rossi	13,824	19.53
Rich Constantine	13,742	19.41
Denelle Fedor	4,157	5.87
Total votes	70,785	100.00
General election
Sylvia Arenas	59,526	54.45
Johnny Khamis	49,800	45.55
Total votes	109,326	100.00

== District 4 ==
2022 Santa Clara County Board of Supervisors 4th district election

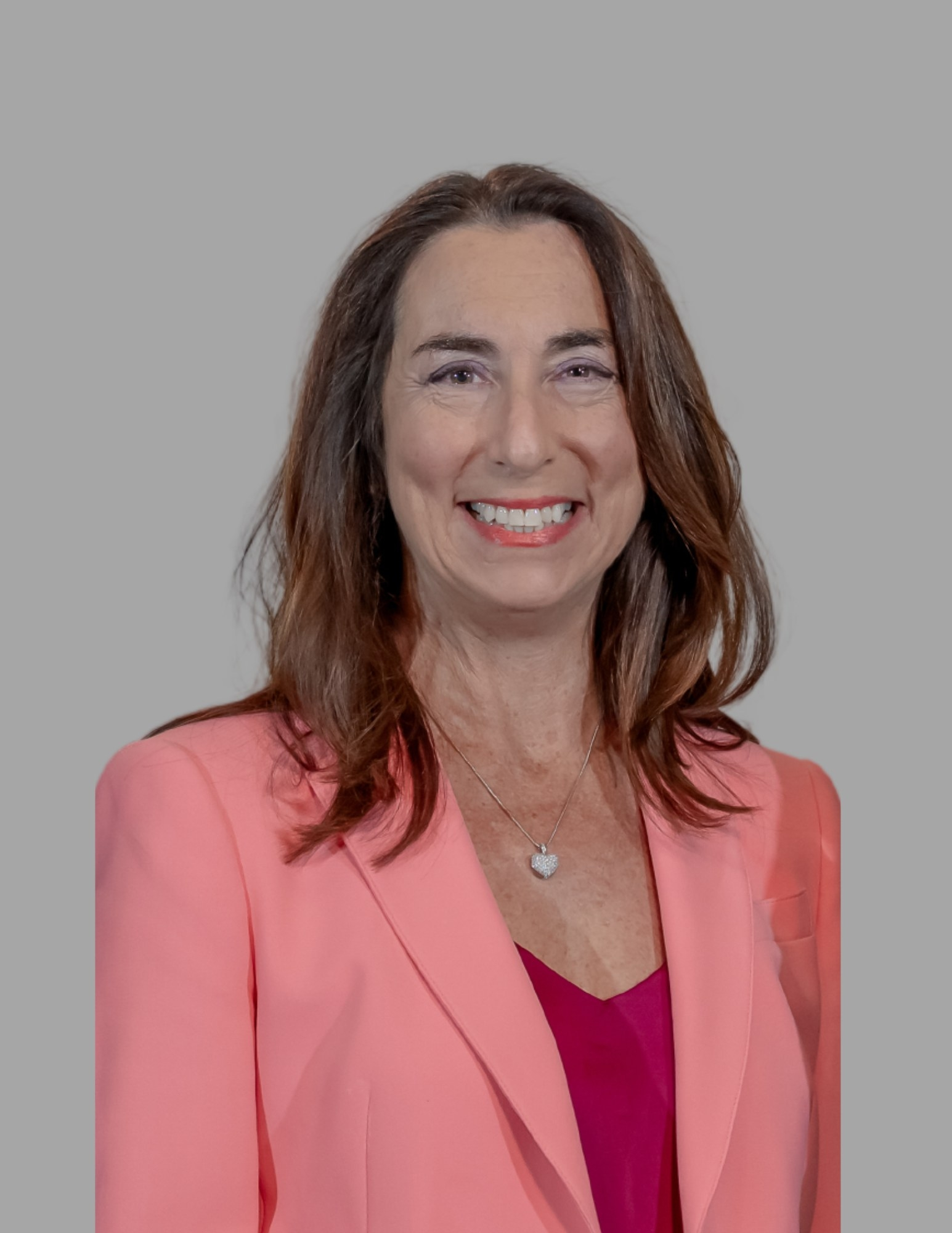
Candidate	Susan Ellenberg
First round	54,403; 100%
Supervisor before election
Susan Ellenberg
Supervisor after election
Susan Ellenberg

=== Candidate ===
- Susan Ellenberg, incumbent supervisor

=== Endorsements ===
Susan Ellenberg

Labor unions

- AFL-CIO South Bay Labor Council
- IBEW Local 332
- IFPTE Local 21

Organizations

- Dean Democratic Club of Silicon Valley

=== Results ===
2022 Santa Clara County Board of Supervisors 4th district election
Primary election
Candidate	Votes	%
Susan Ellenberg (incumbent)	54,403	100.00
Total votes	54,403	100.00
