= 2000 Santa Clara County Board of Supervisors election =

Local election in California

- March 7 (primary); November 7 (runoff)

3 of the 5 seats of the Santa Clara County Board of Supervisors

The 2000 Santa Clara County Board of Supervisors election were held on March 7, 2000, to elect three of the five seats of the Santa Clara County Board of Supervisors, with runoffs held on November 7, 2000. Runoffs only occurred if no candidate received more than 50% of the votes cast in the contest. Local elections in California are officially nonpartisan. The Santa Clara County Board of Supervisors is the governing body for Santa Clara County. Each supervisor is elected to a 4-year term, with each supervisor capped at 3 consecutive terms in office.

== District 2 ==
Incumbent Blanca Alvarado was initially appointed to the 2nd district in 1995 to fill the vacancy left by Zoe Lofgren after she was elected to the U.S. House of Representatives. She was subsequently reelected to the 2nd district in 1996. She was eligible for reelection.

=== Results ===
2000 Santa Clara County Board of Supervisors 2nd district election
Primary election
Candidate	Votes	%
Blanca Alvarado (incumbent)	31,661	100.0
Total votes	31,661	100.0

== District 3 ==
Incumbent Peter "Primo" McHugh was elected to the 3rd district in 1996 in the runoff with 51.0% of the vote. He was eligible for reelection.

=== Results ===
2000 Santa Clara County Board of Supervisors 3rd district election
Primary election
Candidate	Votes	%
Pete "Primo" McHugh (incumbent)	43,961	100.0
Total votes	43,961	100.0

== District 5 ==
Incumbent Joe Simitian was elected to the 5th district in 1996 in the runoff with 57.3% of the vote. He was eligible for reelection, but instead ran for the 21st district in the California State Assembly.

=== Results ===
2000 Santa Clara County Board of Supervisors 5th district election
Primary election
Candidate	Votes	%
Liz Kniss	31,144	42.5
Dolores Sandoval	24,818	33.9
Terry Alan Trumbull	17,255	23.6
Total votes	73,217	100.0
General election
Liz Kniss	55,304	51.2
Dolores Sandoval	52,640	48.8
Total votes	107,944	100.0
