= 2002 Santa Clara County Board of Supervisors election =

Local election in California

- March 5 (primary)

2 of the 5 seats of the Santa Clara County Board of Supervisors

The 2002 Santa Clara County Board of Supervisors election were held on March 5, 2002, to elect two of the five seats of the Santa Clara County Board of Supervisors. Runoffs would occur if no candidate received more than 50% of the votes cast in the contest, but no runoff was held since every primary contest had a candidate receive more than 50%. Local elections in California are officially nonpartisan. The Santa Clara County Board of Supervisors is the governing body for Santa Clara County. Each supervisor is elected to a 4-year term, with each supervisor capped at 3 consecutive terms in office.

== District 1 ==
Incumbent Don Gage was elected to the 1st district in 1998, and he was eligible for reelection.

=== Results ===
2002 Santa Clara County Board of Supervisors 1st district election
Primary election
Candidate	Votes	%
Don Gage (incumbent)	32,057	67.0
Dennis Kennedy	15,769	33.0
Total votes	47,826	100.0

== District 4 ==
Incumbent Jim Beall was elected to the 4th district in 1994 and 1998. He was eligible for reelection.

=== Results ===
2002 Santa Clara County Board of Supervisors 4th district election
Primary election
Candidate	Votes	%
Jim Beall (incumbent)	38,422	100.0
Total votes	38,422	100.0
