= Dominic L. Cortese =

American politician (born 1932)

Member of the California State Assembly from the 23rd district
- In office December 7, 1992 - November 30, 1996
- Preceded by: John Vasconcellos
- Succeeded by: Mike Honda

Member of the California State Assembly from the 24th district
- In office December 1, 1980 - November 30, 1996
- Preceded by: Leona H. Egeland
- Succeeded by: Chuck Quackenbush

Personal details
- Born: September 27, 1932 (age 94) San Jose, California
- Party: Reform (1996); Democratic (before 1996)
- Spouse: Suzanne
- Children: Dave Cortese and four others: Rosanne, Mary Liz, Thomas and Jim
- Education: Santa Clara University

Military service
- Branch/service: United States Army
- Rank: First lieutenant

Dominic L. Cortese (born September 27, 1932) is a former California State Assemblyman who served from 1980 until 1996. For most of his career, Cortese was a moderate Democrat, but in 1995 he gained national attention when he became a member of Ross Perot's Reform Party. He was the highest ranking elected official of the newly formed party at the time. There were international media reports of this event, including the fact that Cortese was being considered by Perot to be his vice presidential running mate in the 1996 election.

== Early life and career ==
Cortese was born in San Jose, California, one of five children of Rose Carnova, an American of Sicilian descent, and Vincent Cortese, a native of the Sicilian town of Trabia who immigrated to the United States around 1917 and eventually acquired farm land in and near the Santa Clara Valley, growing tomatoes, prunes, cherries, apricots and wheat. As they grew up, he and his siblings worked on the family farms and continued to farm as adults. Though Vincent Cortese never held public office, he was involved in civic affairs in the 1950s and 1960s, visiting property owners outside of San Jose to promote the expansion of the city limits to the north, east, and south.

Cortese served on the Santa Clara County Board of Supervisors from 1969 until 1980. It was his first election attempt during a period of heavy social unrest, and involved an extremely active campaign which led to his defeat of an entrenched sixteen-year incumbent. He was the youngest ever elected to Board. Within a few days of his election, the local newspaper publisher asked him to co-chair the Annual Santa Clara County Scout-O-Rama under a group of local civic leaders. It was a post he held for six consecutive years. Cortese won two subsequent re-elections and during his tenure chaired the Board three times. He also chaired the Local Agency Formation Commission twice (during which the Mid-Peninsula Regional Open Space District was authorized), the Santa Clara Valley Transportation District (which he was instrumental in creating as chair of the Board of Supervisors and co-chair of the campaign to create the district) twice, and the Local Criminal Justice Planning Board created by Governor Ronald Reagan. He served as the Board's representative on the Regional Air Quality Board, the Bay Area Conservation and Development Commission, and ABAG. He was the Board's delegate to the local Economic Opportunity Commission (Federal War on Poverty). When the EOC was under threat of takeover by the Federal government, Cortese along with two other local officials founded the Economic and Social Opportunities Commission (ESO). He was asked to meet with President Jimmy Carter during the 1979 oil crisis after his proposal to support the President's "Windfall Profits" proposal and/or nationalize the oil companies was adopted by his Board and other cities and counties throughout the state. He was a founding member of the California Association of LAFCOS (CALAFCO) and was its president twice. Santa Clara County became only the second county in the state to adopt an ordinance which gave recognized employee groups the right to meet and confer and to negotiate wages and other terms and conditions of employment. He played a key role in the hiring of an Affirmative Action Officer and witnessed the signing of the Santa Clara Plan to phase in minority hiring within definite time constraints. Cortese headed a committee to bring to an end the long fought federal court battle over equality hiring in the Sheriff's office. This effort resulted in a vast recruiting and training program that culminated in the hiring of 60 Chicano deputies, approximately one half the number of vacancies. It was soon recognized that these officers were among the foremost in the department. He maintained close rapport with the local Opportunities Industrialization Center an affiliate of the national OIC founded by Dr. Leon Sullivan. Later the local program became CET, the Center for Employment Training. It was on his motion, after long debate, that OIC was given the community wide Federal Food Stamp Program. It was through his personal negotiations that the OIC was given a contract to train and place 100 new bus drivers for the newly formed Transportation District. Later in his career, CET, the Center for Employment Training, gave Cortese its top Amistad Award reading: "Thanks for Commitment to Training and Employment of the Poor and Unskilled". That recognition included legislation he carried requiring performance standards as part of job training contract grants. During his first year, Cortese appointed numerous persons of Spanish surname to county wide boards and commissions. From 1969 through 1980, the Board created the Commission on the Status of Women, the Commission on Drug Abuse and Alcoholism, the Human Relations Commission, the Commission on Consumer Affairs and the Mobile Homeowners Task Force. During the mid-1970s a new eleven story administration building was constructed. "Dial-A-Ride", a victim of its own success, was commenced in late 1974 and abandoned in early 1975; said to have "too much demand with too few resources". Transportation "outreach" still exists. Cortese chaired the Board when the Angela Davis trial was assigned to Santa Clara County. The county became the focus of international attention. The first question asked by the media at the initial major news conference was "can a black, communist, woman get a fair trial in Santa Clara County?" Cortese answered: "anyone can get a fair trial in Santa Clara County." Santa Clara County was one of the first major public entities to establish a smoking ban in restaurants along with one of the first comprehensive recycling programs in the country. The establishment of a central building permit center received national recognition from the National Conference of Counties during their meeting in Madison, Wisconsin where Cortese received the award. The Board asked the electorate to establish an extensive countywide rural parks program which allowed for the acquisition of numerous regional type parks. Two of those purchases, the pristine ten thousand acre Grant Ranch Park and the popular Lake Cuningham Park were in his supervisorial district at the time. In a letter dated October 2, 1975, John B. Dewitt, Secretary and executive director of Save-the-Redwoods League wrote to then chairman of the Board of Supervisors, Dominic L Cortese: "Dear Mr. Cortese, I want to thank you for your effective action to complete the Grant Ranch Park purchase. Future generations will praise your leadership and foresight in making possible this great public park for the people of the South Bay Area. The public will long remember your wise decision to make this park a reality. (Signed) Sincerely, John B. Dewitt" (Santa Clara County Archives: Grant Ranch).The program is still in existence.

== Assembly career ==
Cortese served as the Chairman of the Assembly Committee on Local Government for years. In 1990, he switched to become the chairman of the Assembly Committee on Water, Parks, and Wildlife. He carried the landmark Cortese-Knox Local Government Reorganization Act, which is still called a "best seller" by the State Printing Office and is the guide for all local government annexations, boundaries, formations, detachments and new cities. He was named Legislator of the Year by the American Planning Association in both 1985 and 1989. In 1989, The California Council American Institute of Architects also named him Legislator of the Year and Honorary Architect. He was asked to chair the Committee on Water Parks and Wildlife by then Speaker Willie Brown, during the period of California's 7-year drought, to act as a facilitator between rural, urban and residential water users including north vs. south, and spent an extensive amount of time to that end visiting those entities throughout the state. He authored key legislation involving the fisheries, water use and the method whereby the State Parks System would award concessions. The latter was especially the result of hearings he held regarding the scandal at Asilomar State Beach in Monterey. Registration of toxic storage facilities and underground tanks was part of a package that led to a registry called "the Cortese list". During the flooding disaster of 1986, Governor George Deukmejian signed an emergency measure by Cortese that provided one hundred fifteen million dollars in flood relief money. The bill reached the Governor's desk within two weeks of being introduced. Another measure created the autonomous Valley Transit Authority in Santa Clara County. A Cortese measure provided several million dollars for a graphics animation center at the University of California, San Diego.The one bill that Cortese speaks of as being his most rewarding required insurance companies to cover the cost of mammograms. After at a two-year battle with insurance company opposition, the bill was signed into law and has saved lives. The American Cancer Society named him Legislator Of The Year in 1988. He also carried the Constitutional Amendment that allowed for state education bonds by a fifty percent vote. He carried the bill that guaranteed the vehicle license fee for local governments. As chair of the Local Government committee, Cortese was asked to intervene in the San Bruno Mountain dispute in Millbrae and was recognized by both sides as an "official" mediator. After countless hours of meetings, the dispute which had been ongoing for many years was resolved without legislation and without further litigation. Cortese also carried the legislation that led to the settlement of a major shore lands dispute (Pete's Harbor) in nearby Redwood City, California which had been litigated for fourteen years prior between owner Pete Uccelli and the State Lands Commission.

In addition to chairing his own committees, Cortese at one point in his legislative career was asked by the Speaker to serve on several additional committees among which were, Government Organization, Subcommittee On Veterans Affairs, Revenue and Taxation, Joint Legislative Audit Committee, Public Employees Retirement, Seismic Safety Committee, Transportation, Agriculture, Housing, Rural Caucus and the Little Hoover Commission. He also chaired a Select Committee on Neighborhood Violence, a Select Committee on Childcare, and a Committee on Wine Production and Economy under which he held numerous hearings in various states and established the groundbreaking rule for reciprocal shipping. The NAPA Democratic Caucus named him their 1989 Legislator of the Year. The work of the committee was recognized nationally by the National Conference of State Legislatures, and Cortese was asked to chair a counterpart committee on the national level. That committee brought legislators to Sacramento from all over the country and eventually held hearings across the entire country. In March 1993 the wine industry ask him to represent the United States at the international Vinelink General Assembly in Paris where he and his wife were also guest of Moet Hennessy in Champagne. For a number of years, a traditional, very popular, bi-partisan, open membership, Italian Caucus was chaired by Cortese and Senate Pro Tem David Roberti. It was often attended by the Counsel General of Italy. Landmark legislation, AB202, sponsored by the Seismic Safety Commission included a long overdue update of the Uniform Building Code establishing the Uniform Code for Building Conservation (UCBC). Standards for addressing unreinforced masonry buildings were now required at the local government building permit issuance stage. An additional measure requiring a basic plumber's tape secured around water heaters has prevented what in the past lead to catastrophic earthquake gas and fire damage. Cortese carried a resolution creating the California Italian American Task Force, the membership of which was appointed by Governor Pete Wilson and included outstanding members of the Italian American community throughout the state. Inquiries were received from all over the country. The National Italian American Foundation named him in their 1987 Salute to Italian Americans in Government.

During his legislative career Cortese was recognized as "Legislator of the Year" by a broad spectrum of statewide organizations some of which were cited in the August 5, 1996, Assembly House Resolution of Commendation, No. 79: the El Matador Fellowship Award which is the highest award bestowed by the California Contract Cities Association, the First Legislative Merit Award from the Association of California Water Agencies, the Commitment to Children Award from the Association for the Education of Young Children; in 1995, he received both the Sierra Club Commendation for Environmental Leadership and Legislator of the Year Award from the California Park and Recreation Society, becoming the only legislator to have received the distinction twice. Also, in that year, he was named an honorary member of the California Aquaculture Association. At a statewide conference of the League of California Cities, then San Francisco Mayor Dianne Feinstein presented Cortese, Chair of the Assembly Committee on Local Government, with a Resolution of Commendation as 1983 Legislator of the Year for having authored major legislation involving local government. He received numerous awards and certificates of appreciation from local service clubs and community organizations. He participated as featured speaker at numerous statewide conferences including: The California Association of LAFCOS, California Supervisors Association, California Contract Cities Association, California State Chamber of Commerce, the Bay Area Council, California Special Districts Association, Association of California Water Agencies, California Realtors Association, Los Angeles County Employees Association and the League of California Cities.He and his wife Suzanne were members of a 1983 California Legislator's Mission to Israel. In 1984, he and Suzanne were delegates on the California Sister State Task Force that traveled to Taiwan and established the first Sister State relationship with the Republic of Taiwan pursuant to Senate Concurrent Resolution No. 40. In i988, he received the Coordination Council of North American Affairs Award of Appreciation for Promotion of Sino-American Cultural and Commercial Relations. In that same year, the National Federation of Asian Indian Organizations in America recognized him with their Award in Recognition and Appreciation of Contributions to the Indian Community. He has also been honored with the Ordine al Merito, Order of Merit of the Republic of Italy, the highest ranking honor and most senior order of the Republic, Cavaliere Ufficiale, Knight of the Republic.

== Speakership battle ==
Cortese was one of the Democrats that Republicans hoped to win over when they were struggling to gain the speakership in 1995. Brown had Assemblyman Dick Mountjoy expelled, so the Republicans had only 40 votes when they needed 41. Without Paul Horcher and Cortese, the Democrats had only 39 votes and one vacancy. Horcher, scorned by the Republicans in his earlier election, became an Independent and voted for Brown on the first roll call. Cortese abstained, but cast the single deciding vote on the second roll call with his wife sitting next to him at his desk. Cortese met privately with Jim Brulte, Brown's Republican adversary, and later with Brown and Horcher upon entering the Assembly chambers earlier that day.

== Education ==
Cortese received a Bachelor of Science degree from Santa Clara University. He graduated from Pala Middle School in San Jose and Bellarmine College Preparatory High School in 1950. He holds an Honorary Law Degree from Lincoln Law School. A college ROTC graduate, Cortese served for two years in the United States Army,(1954–1956), as a First Lieutenant. He was given an Award of Recognition for Support of Vietnam Veterans of America during their 1988 California Statewide Convention held in San Jose. He is a Rotary Club Paul Harris Fellow.

== Personal life ==
Cortese is a Roman Catholic. He is married to Suzanne Donovan and has five adult children and nine grandchildren. In November, 2020, one of his sons, Dave, was elected to represent Senate District 15 in the California State Senate. Before this Dave served on the Santa Clara County Board of Supervisors, the San Jose City Council, and trustee for the Eastside Union High School District. The family legacy was recognized when Dominic Cortese was proclaimed an Honorary Citizen during a citywide town hall meeting in his father's hometown of Trabia, Italy. The record of the event was read and recorded in the Assembly Daily Journal during legislative proceedings in Sacramento on Friday, January 12, 1984. Although the family transitioned into development under obvious pressures of growth, they farmed and operated family fruit stand in the Evergreen area of San Jose until very recently. As benefactors, Dominic and Suzanne Cortese are members of the Legacy Society of the Silicon Valley Community Foundation, the Felice Foundation, created by Dr. Leo Buscaglia, and The Italian American Heritage Association. Together, they were awarded the prestigious L'Esprit de Francoise Award from Notre Dame High School, Suzanne's alma mater, in San Jose, California. Cortese is an honorary member of the Civic Club of San Jose. Dominic Cortese served on the Santa Clara University Board of Fellows. He was a member of the International Optimist, Elks, Rotary and Moose Clubs. He was also a member of American Legion Post 250, Benefactor St. Francis Assisi Parish and Our Lady of Guadalupe Parish in San Jose, Advisor and Volunteer, Santa Clara County Youth Foundation's Mentor Program and member of the Board of Directors, California Conservation Corp, Pacific Bays District. He served on the Board of Directors of SunSweet Growers.

== Election history ==
- Elected to Santa Clara County Board of Supervisors 1968; re-elected in 1972, 1976
- Elected to the California State Legislature in 1980, re-elected 1982, 1984, 1986, 1988, 1990, 1992, 1994
- Reform Party candidate, 13th State Senate District 1996
- Elected to Alum Rock School Board (his elementary school) in 1998 to four-year term. He chaired the board twice.

Political offices
Preceded by Leona H. Egeland	California State Assemblyman, 24th District; 1980–1992	Succeeded by Chuck Quackenbush
Preceded by John Vasconcellos	California State Assemblyman, 23rd District; 1992–1996	Succeeded by Mike Honda
