= Patricia Mahan =

American politician (1952–2023)

Mayor of Santa Clara
- In office 2002–2014

Personal details
- Born: May 30, 1952
- Died: October 28, 2023 (aged 71)
- Education: Santa Clara University

Patricia Marie Mahan (May 30, 1952 – October 28, 2023) was an American attorney and politician. She was elected as the Mayor of the City of Santa Clara in November 2002 and re-elected in 2006 and 2010, before serving as a councilmember after 2014 through her resignation in 2020. Mahan died on October 28, 2023, at the age of 71.
