= Blanca Alvarado =

American social activist and politician

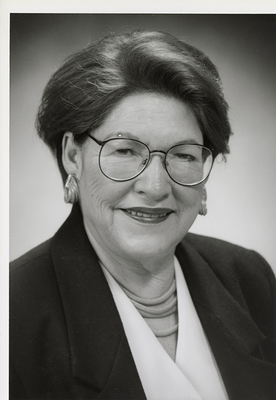

Member of the Santa Clara County Board of Supervisors from the 2nd district
- In office 1994–2008
- Preceded by: Zoe Lofgren
- Succeeded by: George Shirakawa Jr.

Member of the San Jose City Council from the 5th district
- In office 1980–1994

Personal details
- Born: 1931 (age 94–95) Cokedale, Colorado, U.S.
- Known for: American social activist and former politician

Blanca Alvarado (born 1931) is an American social activist and former politician. She was the first Latina elected to the San Jose City Council and the Santa Clara County Board of Supervisors and the first Latina to serve as the board's chairperson.

== Early life ==
The daughter of a coal miner who was active in the union, she was born in the Colorado mining town of Cokedale. After the mine's closure, the family moved to the Santa Clara Valley in California. She was educated at San Jose High School; after graduating, she married Jose J. Alvarado, a local radio host. The couple divorced in 1968.

== Career ==
She hosted her own radio program on KLOK radio. Alvarado also worked with Cesar Chavez to establish the Community Services Organization and was involved with the Chicano Employment Committee and the Opportunities Industrial Center. She was president of the local chapter of the Mexican American Political Association and was also an officer at the state level.

In 1980, she was elected to San Jose City Council for District 5; she represented East San Jose until 1994. Alvarado served two terms as San Jose's first Latina vice mayor. In 1995, she was appointed to fill a vacant position in the Santa Clara County Board of Supervisors; she was elected to the position the following year and spent 12 years representing District 2. She retired from the Board in 2008 after 28 years in municipal politics. During her time in office, she fought for better representation of the Chicano community of San Jose, helped foster the arts and advocated on behalf of youth and minorities. Alvarado also served in several committees such as the Children and Families' Committee and Public Safety and Justice Committee. She also served as vice-chair of San Jose's Redevelopment Committee, as chair of the Community Services Committee and as city council liaison for the city's Fine Arts Commission. She played a significant role in lobbying for the Hispanic community of the city including improving representation on the city's decision-making bodies and the development of facilities such as a new Youth Center.

Alvarado was also active in efforts to improve Santa Clara County's juvenile detention system. She established an Office of Women's Advocacy for the county to develop programs to help women develop in their professional and personal lives. Other notable achievements included ensuring that all children in the county would receive some health insurance coverage from their parents' employment, improvements to the Santa Clara Valley Medical Center and construction of a Mexican Heritage Plaza, one of the largest Latino cultural centers in the country.

In 2018, Alvarado helped launch a campaign to close Reid–Hillview Airport with the aim of developing more affordable housing in the region.

== Recognition and legacy ==
In 2002, Alvarado was awarded the Woman of the Year Award by the San Francisco Bay Area Chapter of the Women's Transportation Seminar, an international organization dedicated to the professional advancement of women in transportation, recognizing her contributions as a member of the board for the Santa Clara Valley Transportation Authority. In 2005, she was awarded the Ohtli Award by the government of Mexico. Also in 2005, her achievements were recognized in the United States House of Representatives.

Alpha Charter Schools' Blanca Alvarado School in East San Jose was named in her honor.
