= Joe Simitian =

American politician (born 1953)

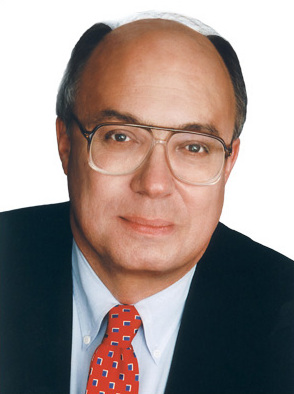
- Official portrait, 2020

Member of the Santa Clara County Board of Supervisors from the 5th district
- In office January 7, 2013 – January 6, 2025
- Preceded by: Liz Kniss
- Succeeded by: Margaret Abe-Koga
- In office December 2, 1996 – December 4, 2000
- Preceded by: Dianne McKenna
- Succeeded by: Liz Kniss

Member of the California Senate from the 11th district
- In office December 6, 2004 – November 30, 2012
- Preceded by: Byron Sher
- Succeeded by: Mark Leno (redistricted)

Member of the California State Assembly from the 21st district
- In office December 4, 2000 – November 30, 2004
- Preceded by: Ted Lempert
- Succeeded by: Ira Ruskin

Personal details
- Born: Saren Joseph Smitian; February 1, 1953 (age 73) Hackensack, New Jersey, U.S.
- Party: Democratic
- Spouse: Mary Hughes
- Education: Colorado College (BA); Stanford University (MA); University of California, Berkeley (MUP, JD)

Saren Joseph Simitian (born February 1, 1953) is an American politician. A member of the Democratic Party, he was the State Senator representing California's 11th State Senate district, which encompasses all or part of 13 cities in San Mateo, Santa Clara, and Santa Cruz counties, from 2004 to 2012. Approaching his term limit at the end of 2012, he ran for and was elected to the Santa Clara County Board of Supervisors. He was re-elected to the same seat in 2016 and again in 2020.

== Education ==
Simitian graduated from Palo Alto High School in 1970. He attended Colorado College and earned a Bachelor of Arts cum laude in political science. He earned a Master of Arts in international policy studies from Stanford University, a Master of City and Regional Planning from the University of California, Berkeley, and a Juris Doctor from the University of California, Berkeley School of Law.

== Early political career ==
Simitian was President of the Palo Alto School Board, and served as a member from 1983 to 1991. He was on the Palo Alto City Council from 1992 to 1996 and served as Mayor for part of that time. He was represented District 5 on the Santa Clara County Board of Supervisors from 1996–2000.

== California state legislature ==
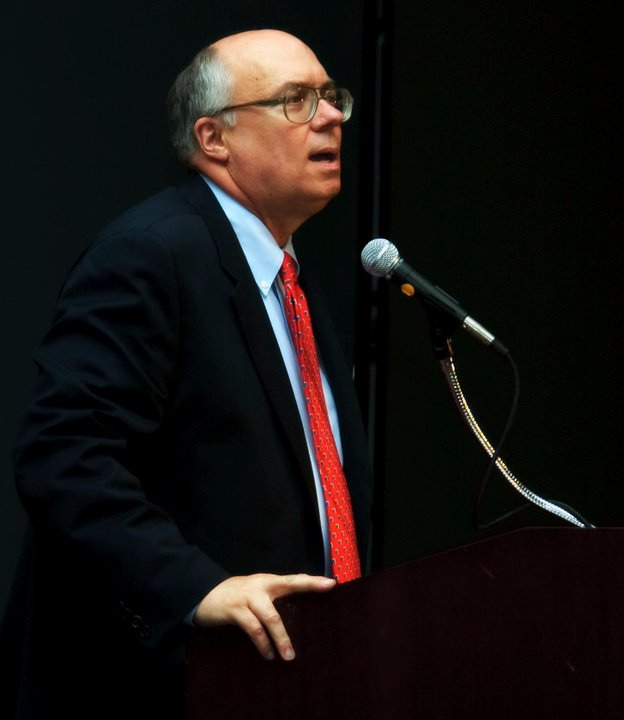
Simitian in 2010

=== State Assembly ===
Simitian was elected to the California State Assembly's 21st District in November 2000, and re-elected to a second term in November 2002.

=== State Senate ===
Simitian was elected to the California State Senate in November 2004 for District 11. He defeated former Assemblyman and San Mateo County Supervisor Ted Lempert in the Democratic primary election, also prevailing in the general election. Simitian was re-elected to a second term in 2008. His second term ended in 2012. Simitian was one of only four Democratic Senators to vote against California's ambitious High Speed Rail plan.

Simitian authored California's hands-free cell phone bill.

Azerbaijan's Foreign Ministry has put Simitian on a list of individuals banned from entering the country. The decision was made after Simitian travelled to Nagorno-Karabakh without Baku's permission.

== Santa Clara County Board of Supervisors ==
Simitian was elected again to the District 5 seat of the Board of Supervisors in 2012, after reaching his term limit in the State Senate. He was re-elected in 2016 with 89 percent of the vote and ran unopposed for re-election in 2020.

Simitian served as President of the Santa Clara County Board of Supervisors in 2018 and 2019, and after winning reelection in 2020, continues to represent District 5 (Los Altos, Los Altos Hills, Palo Alto, Cupertino, Mountain View, Saratoga, and Stanford, as well as portions of San Jose). He was first elected to the Board of Supervisors in November 1996, serving from 1997 to 2000. In 2022, redistricting adjusted the cities Simitian represents to include Los Gatos and Monte Sereno.

As Supervisor, Simitian is credited with saving the 400 units of affordable housing at the Buena Vista Mobile Home Park, and he has proposed the building of affordable teacher housing in Palo Alto for teachers across the county. He also successfully pushed the County to fund multiple new playgrounds accessible to special needs children, following the creation of Palo Alto's Magical Bridge Playground.

Simitian has advanced multiple privacy-related initiatives at the county level. Under his guidance, Santa Clara County became "one of the first in the country" to hire a privacy specialist in a designated role to oversee its data-driven programs. He also secured passage of a surveillance ordinance, the first of its kind in the United States, requiring that police forces get explicit permission for new surveillance technology.

Simitian pushed for more civilian oversight for Sheriff and county jails and secured approval for body-worn cameras for Sheriff's Deputies and jail guards.

== 2024 U.S. House of Representatives election ==
In 2024, Simitian ran to represent California's 16th congressional district to replace the retiring Anna Eshoo, earning her endorsement in the primary. His candidacy prompted an unusual occurrence; despite announcing on election night that he was in the top two candidates, and would consequently advance to the November run-off, as votes were counted in the following weeks, Simitian constantly traded places with another candidate, Evan Low, for second and third place. The final results saw the two tie, and as a result both – alongside first-placed Sam Liccardo – were expected to be on the ballot for the general election, in only the second three-way election since California adopted the top-two primary system in 2012. Given the close result, the possibility of a recount has been raised, but SFist reported that neither campaign had the funds available to support one. Both campaigns released statements indicating that they intend to compete in the general election.

However, after a poll believed to be conducted on behalf of supporters of first-placed Sam Liccardo testing two-way match-ups was fielded, two residents of the district, including former Liccardo campaign finance director and current donor Jonathan Padilla, requested a recount; Liccardo himself is ineligible to because he does not live in the district. Liccardo's campaign denied responsibility, though they agreed the recount was necessary, saying "every vote should be counted."

At the conclusion of the recount, Simitian was ultimately eliminated and Low advanced to the general election by a 5-vote margin.

== Personal life ==
Joe Simitian is married to Mary Hughes, a Bay Area political consultant. Simitian proposed to Hughes on election night in 1996 upon being elected to the Santa Clara County Board of Supervisors.

== Electoral history ==
Joe Simitian electoral history

=== California State Assembly ===
2000 California State Assembly 21st district election
Primary election
| Party | Candidate | Votes | % |
|---|---|---|---|
| Democratic | Joe Simitian | 57,641 | 100.0 |
| Total votes | | 57,641 | 100.0 |
General election
| Democratic | Joe Simitian | 82,466 | 54.9 |
| Republican | Deborah Wilder | 53,140 | 35.4 |
| Green | Gloria Purcell | 14,641 | 9.7 |
| Total votes | | 150,247 | 100.0 |

2002 California State Assembly 21st district election
Primary election
| Party | Candidate | Votes | % |
|---|---|---|---|
| Democratic | Joe Simitian (incumbent) | 32,343 | 100.0 |
| Total votes | | 32,343 | 100.0 |
General election
| Democratic | Joe Simitian (incumbent) | 72,104 | 60.5 |
| Republican | Jim Russell | 42,808 | 36.0 |
| Libertarian | Raymond M. Bell, Jr. | 4,286 | 3.5 |
| Total votes | | 119,198 | 100.0 |

=== California State Senate ===
2004 California State Senate 11th district election
Primary election
| Party | Candidate | Votes | % |
|---|---|---|---|
| Democratic | Joe Simitian | 65,597 | 57.5 |
| Democratic | Ted Lempert | 48,517 | 42.5 |
| Total votes | | 114,114 | 100.0 |
General election
| Democratic | Joe Simitian | 230,484 | 66.6 |
| Republican | Jon Zellhoefer | 101,887 | 29.4 |
| Libertarian | Allen M. Rice | 14,080 | 4.0 |
| Total votes | | 346,451 | 100.0 |

2008 California State Senate 11th district election
Primary election
| Party | Candidate | Votes | % |
|---|---|---|---|
| Democratic | Joe Simitian (incumbent) | 76,556 | 100.0 |
| Total votes | | 76,556 | 100.0 |
General election
| Democratic | Joe Simitian (incumbent) | 272,154 | 74.9 |
| Republican | Blair Austin Nathan | 91,592 | 25.1 |
| Total votes | | 363,746 | 100.0 |

=== Santa Clara County Board of Supervisors ===
2012 Santa Clara County Board of Supervisors 5th district
| Party | Candidate | Votes | % |
|---|---|---|---|
| Nonpartisan | Joe Simitian | 39,131 | 58.27 |
| Nonpartisan | Kris Huyilan Wang | 15,367 | 22.88 |
| Nonpartisan | Barry Chang | 12,654 | 18.84 |
| Total votes | | 67,152 | 100.00 |

2016 Santa Clara County Board of Supervisors 5th district
| Party | Candidate | Votes | % |
|---|---|---|---|
| Nonpartisan | Joe Simitian (incumbent) | 71,383 | 89.40 |
| Nonpartisan | John Mumy | 8,464 | 10.60 |
| Total votes | | 79,847 | 100.00 |

2016 Santa Clara County Board of Supervisors 5th district
| Party | Candidate | Votes | % |
|---|---|---|---|
| Nonpartisan | Joe Simitian (incumbent) | 85,322 | 100.00 |
| Total votes | | 85,322 | 100.00 |

=== U.S. House of Representatives ===
2024 California's 16th congressional district primary (final recount results on May 1, 2024)
| Party | Candidate | Votes | % |
|---|---|---|---|
| Democratic | Sam Liccardo | 38,492 | 21.1 |
| Democratic | Evan Low | 30,261 | 16.6 |
| Democratic | Joe Simitian | 30,256 | 16.6 |
| Republican | Peter Ohtaki | 23,283 | 12.8 |
| Democratic | Peter Dixon | 14,677 | 8.1 |
| Democratic | Rishi Kumar | 12,383 | 6.8 |
| Republican | Karl Ryan | 11,563 | 6.3 |
| Democratic | Julie Lythcott-Haims | 11,386 | 6.2 |
| Democratic | Ahmed Mostafa | 5,814 | 3.2 |
| Democratic | Greg Tanaka | 2,421 | 1.3 |
| Democratic | Joby Bernstein | 1,652 | 0.9 |
| Total votes | | 182,188 | 100.0 |
