= Otto Lee =

American politician

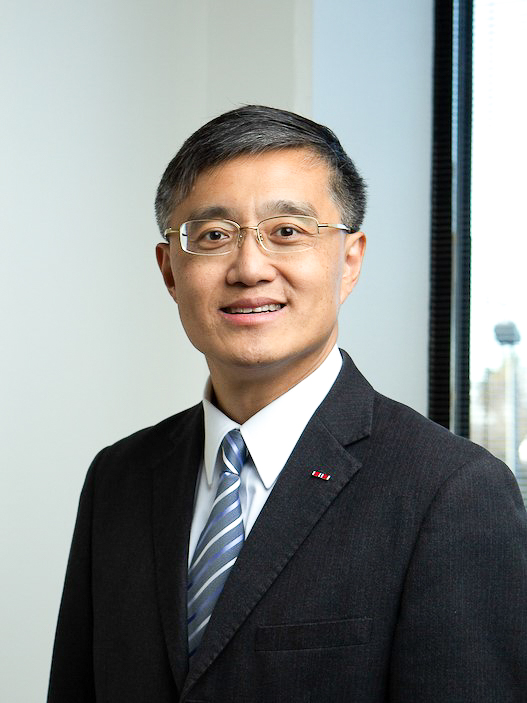

Santa Clara County Supervisor from District 3
- Incumbent
- Assumed office 2020
- Preceded by: Dave Cortese

Mayor of Sunnyvale, California
- In office 2006–2007

Member of the Sunnyvale City Council
- In office 2003–2011

Personal details
- Born: Lee Chau-hiu; July 29, 1966 (age 60) British Hong Kong
- Party: Democratic
- Education: UC Berkeley (B.S.); UC Hastings College of the Law (J.D.); Leiden University (LL.M.)
- Occupation: Patent attorney

Military service
- Allegiance: United States of America
- Branch/service: United States Navy
- Years of service: 1989–1991, 2003, 2009–2010 (active); 1991–2018 (reserve)
- Rank: Commander
- Unit: Navy Supply Corps
- Battles/wars: Gulf War; Operation Noble Eagle; Operation Iraqi Freedom
- Awards: Bronze Star

Chinese name
- Traditional Chinese: 李洲曉
- Simplified Chinese: 李洲晓
- Jyutping: Lei5 Zau1 Hiu2
Transcriptions
Standard Mandarin
- Hanyu Pinyin: Li Zhōu Xiǎo
Yue: Cantonese
- Jyutping: Lei5 Zau1 Hiu2

Otto Oswald Chau Hiu Lee (born July 29, 1967) is a Hong Kong-born American politician, attorney, and military veteran who was a Sunnyvale, California city council member from 2003 to 2011, before which he was on the Planning Commission, which he chaired from 2000 to 2001. From 2005 to 2006 he was vice mayor, and from 2006 to 2007 he was the 57th mayor of Sunnyvale. He is a patent attorney, and a co-founder and partner of the Intellectual Property Law Group LLP.

Prior to becoming a lawyer, Lee served in the U.S. Navy as a supply corps officer. He was a commander in the United States Naval Reserve and the executive officer of a Naval Aircraft Carriers Reserve unit based in San Diego.

== Early life and education ==
Lee was born Lee Chau-hiu in Hong Kong, then a British colony, in 1967. He moved to the U.S. state of California at age 15. He received a B.S. in chemical engineering and nuclear engineering from the University of California, Berkeley, a J.D. from the University of California, Hastings College of the Law, and an LL.M. in Public International Law from Leiden University in The Netherlands.

== Military career ==
Lee joined the United States Navy in 1989 as an ensign. During the Gulf War in 1991, Lee served aboard the USS Harry E. Yarnell as treasurer, disbursing officer, and assistant supply officer. After this initial active duty he continued to serve in the Navy Reserve, recalled to active duty for Operation Noble Eagle in 2003 and again in 2009 for Operation Iraqi Freedom. Lee also supported the defense of the Republic of Korea under the Commander Naval Forces Korea. Most recently holding the rank of commander, Lee retired from the Navy in 2018.

== Political campaigns ==
=== 2008 Santa Clara County Board of Supervisors election ===
In 2008 he qualified in the June primary to compete to represent District 3 on the Santa Clara County Board of Supervisors, but lost to David Cortese in the November general election, receiving 45.2% of votes cast to Cortese's 55.8%. of the votes

=== 2012 U.S. House of Representatives election ===
On March 27, 2012, Lee announced his candidacy for California's 22nd Congressional District seat to challenge incumbent Representative Devin Nunes, Republican of Tulare. This district covers areas of Fresno and Tulare counties, both located in California's San Joaquin Valley.

Lee and Nunes were the only candidates in the June 6 nonpartisan primary, in which Lee placed second with 30.1 percent to Nunes's 69.9 percent. On November 6, Nunes won the general election with 132,386 votes (61.9 percent) to Lee's 81,555 votes (38.1 percent).

=== 2020 Santa Clara County Board of Supervisors election ===
In 2020, Lee was among four candidates for the open District 3 seat of the Santa Clara County Board of Supervisors to replace the termed-out Dave Cortese. In the March 3, 2020 top-two primary election, Lee finished in second place with 29 percent of the vote behind sitting assemblymember Kansen Chu, who had 31.5 percent. of the vote That fall, Lee earned 60.5% of the vote to decisively defeat Chu in the general election.

Santa Clara County Board of Supervisors Election, 2020
Primary election
Party	Candidate	Votes	%
Nonpartisan	Kansen Chu	24,557	31.5
Nonpartisan	Otto Lee	22,560	29.0
Nonpartisan	Magdalena Carrasco	20,227	26.0
Nonpartisan	John Leyba	10,548	13.5
Total votes		77,892	100.0
General election
Nonpartisan	Otto Lee	85,663	60.5
Nonpartisan	Kansen Chu	55,946	39.5
Total votes		141,609	100.0

== Supervisor (since 2020) ==
=== Major Legislative Initiatives ===
==== Environment ====
Lee has shown an immense commitment to sustainability and environmental justice, leading the push for the creation of a County sustainability commission. In July 2021, Lee supported an initiative to address concerns over rising sea levels in the region. The initiative involves developing plans to protect critical infrastructure, such as roads and water treatment facilities, and encouraging the use of renewable energy sources.

==== Gun Buyback Program ====
In response to the rise of gun violence across the nation Supervisor Lee has overseen the expansion of the Santa Clara County gun buyback program. The program allows individuals to turn in their firearms in exchange for cash or gift cards. The collected firearms are then destroyed to prevent them from being used in violent crimes or to self harm. This program led to the recovery of over 400 firearms in the City of Milpitas, California in May 2022. Following the success of the program in Milpitas, Supervisor Lee Co-hosted another gun buyback event in the City of Morgan Hill, California that collected another 289 firearms in December 2022.

==== Mental Health ====
In January 2022 Supervisor Lee and Supervisor Susan Ellenberg jointly declared that the state of mental health and substance abuse in the region constituted a public health crisis. Lee made mental health his top priority of 2022, authoring and sponsoring numerous pieces of legislation that led to investments of tens of million dollars to create more mental healthcare options in the county. Since becoming Vice President of the Board in 2023, the board has further committed to increasing the number of beds. The county has a goal of adding 500 behavioral health treatment beds by 2025.

==== Fentanyl Overdose Crisis ====
In response to the Fentanyl overdose crisis in the San Francisco Bay Area and nationally, Supervisor Lee authored a proposal to provide the opioid overdose antidote, Naloxone or Narcan, at Santa Clara County Library District locations. The program involves a massive public outreach on the benefits of Narcan, training county librarians to administer the drug and providing the library locations with kits. When it was approved, Santa Clara County became the first county in the nation to offer Narcan at public libraries.

In addition to the push for greater availability of Narcan in public spaces Supervisor Lee has called for a rapid increase in pathways for careers in drug counseling, and has pushed for mass increase of the number of beds available for Drug detoxification and Drug rehabilitation at the county and State level.

==== Unhoused ====
In 2021, Lee co-hosted the first Community Homeless Conference through the community based organization, Hope for the Unhoused. The event brought together unhoused advocates, non profit leaders and community stakeholders to discuss ways to address homelessness and improve access to housing for those in need. Lee's efforts have also been instrumental in securing $40 million in funding from Santa Clara County to jumpstart numerous unhoused housing sites.

Additionally, Lee has supported the opening of new tiny houses for homeless families in the county.

==== Response to Xenophobia and racism related to the COVID-19 pandemic ====
In response to the rapid rise of Anti-Asian hate crimes in the Bay Area, Supervisor Lee introduced a slew of proposals to research and combat hate crimes against the county’s Asian and Asian-American population. Lee’s proposals were adopted unanimously by the Board and created a community outreach and education campaign against race-based violence against Asians, and began work on federal and legislative advocacy to encourage proposals that focus on racial justice and hate crime prevention.

==== Support for Refugees ====
In 2021, following the U.S. withdrawal from Afghanistan, Supervisor Lee expressed support for Afghan refugees and called for the county to provide resources to help them resettle.

Since the outbreak of the Russian invasion of Ukraine, Supervisor Lee has been a vocal critic of Russia and a prominent supporter of Ukraine. While on a legislative recess-Lee volunteered in Poland providing aid to recently arrived Ukrainian refugees. The experience deeply affected Lee- who quickly began working with the Congressional Office for International Leadership, leading to Santa Clara County hosting a Ukraine Open World Program Delegation in May 2023. The Delegation was the first international delegation that the County of Santa Clara welcomed since the outbreak of the COVID-19 pandemic. Ukraine Consul General Dmytro Kushneruk attended portions of the delegation program, and Consul Anna Zaichencko attended and spoke at a Ukraine flag raising at the County Government Center honoring the delegation and solidarity with Ukraine.

== Democratic National Committee ==
First elected as a National Delegate to the Democratic National Committee in 2016, Lee was reelected to serve from 2020-2024 by the California Democratic Party. In his role at the DNC Lee serves as Vice Chair of DNC AAPI Caucus, Vice Chair of DNC Veterans and Family Council, and has recently been appointed to the 2023 Credentials Committee.
