= Ken Yeager =

American politician

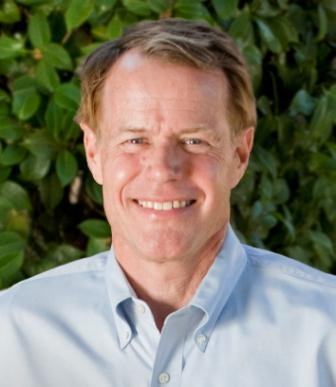

Member of the Santa Clara County Board of Supervisors from the 4th district
- In office 2006–2018
- Preceded by: Jim Beall
- Succeeded by: Susan Ellenberg

Member of the San Jose City Council from the 6th district
- In office 2000–2006
- Preceded by: Frank Fiscalini
- Succeeded by: Pierluigi Oliverio

Personal details
- Born: December 12, 1952 (age 73)
- Party: Democratic
- Domestic partner: Michael Haberecht
- Education: San Jose State University; Stanford University

Ken Yeager (born December 12, 1952) is an American politician. He served on the Santa Clara County Board of Supervisors, representing District 4. First elected to the board in 2006, he represented the cities of Campbell and Santa Clara, as well as west San Jose and the Burbank and Cambrian neighborhoods. Previously, Yeager served on the San Jose City Council from 2000 to 2006. Before that, he served two terms on the San Jose/Evergreen Community College Board. He was a candidate for the 23rd district seat in the California State Assembly in 1996, coming in second.

== Early life and education ==
Ken Yeager was born December 12, 1952. His parents were Ernest Eugene "Gene" Yeager and Carolyn French Yeage.

Yeager attended San José State University, where he earned a B.A. in political science. He went on to Stanford University, earning an M.A. in sociology, and a Ph.D. in education from the Stanford Graduate School of Education. In 2004, Yeager completed Harvard University's John F. Kennedy School of Government program for Senior Executives in State and Local Government as a David Bohnett LGBTQ Victory Institute Leadership Fellow.

== Career ==
=== Early career ===
Prior to his career in politics, he taught political science at San Jose State University for 12 years full time.

In 1984, Yeager was a cofounder of the Bay Area Municipal Elections Committee, described as a "four-county lesbian, gay, bisexual, and transgender political action group." He came out publicly in a 1984 San Jose Mercury News opinion piece in response to the anti-gay rhetoric of a local state senator. In 1992 he became the first openly gay elected official in Santa Clara County, when he was named as trustee of the San Jose-Evergreen Community College District. From 1992 until 2000, he served two terms in the role.

He was a candidate for the 23rd district seat in the California State Assembly in 1996, coming in second in the Democratic primary to then-Santa Clara County Supervisor (later Congressman) Mike Honda.

Yeager served on San Jose City Council from his election in November 2000 until March 2004, when he was re-elected for a second term that lasted until 2006.

In 2001, he flew the rainbow flag for the first time above San Jose City Hall. Yeager amended San Jose's harassment policy in 2003 to include gender identity. In 2004, he was named chair of the San Jose City Council's Blue Ribbon Task Force on Ethics.

=== Recent and current positions ===
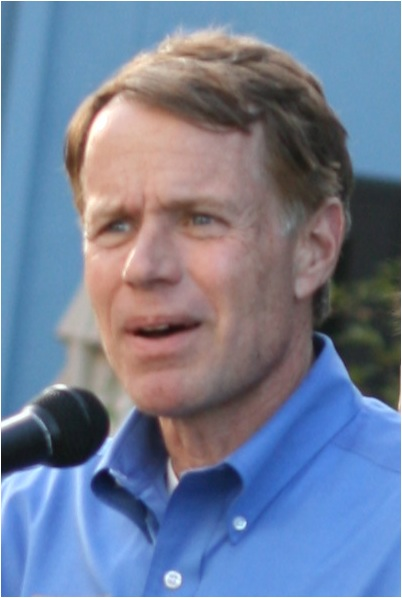
Ken Yeager speaking in 2009

He last served on the Santa Clara County Board of Supervisors, representing District 4 and termed out at the end of 2018. First elected to the board in June 2006, he represented the cities of Campbell, Santa Clara, west San Jose, and the Burbank and Cambrian neighborhoods. He was re-elected in 2010 and 2014. In 2008, and then again in 2013, it was Yeager who presided over the first same-sex marriages in Santa Clara county, and he had overseen around 100 such marriages by 2014. Yeager is a former board member of the Bay Area Air Quality Management District (BAAQMD), and in January 2009 the governor appointed him the BAAQMD representative on the California Air Resources Board for four years.

Involved in public transportation in California, Yeager backs the electrification of Caltrain, extending Bay Area Rapid Transit to San Jose, and building California High-Speed Rail. In late 2010 he joined the board of the Santa Clara Valley Transportation Authority. He is a member of the Caltrain Joint Powers Authority Board of Directors, having served as its chair in 2013. Yeager serves as chairman of the Supervisors' Health and Hospital Committee, and he is also chairman of the California State Association of Counties Health and Human Services Committee. He is furthermore a member of the First 5 Commission of Santa Clara County. By 2014, he had published Trailblazers: Profiles of America's Gay and Lesbian Elected Officials. As of 2017, he continues to periodically teach at San Jose State University.

== Personal ==
Yeager's long-time partner is Michael Haberecht. Yeager is a triathlete and cyclist and frequently commutes to work by bike.

Political offices
Preceded by Jim Beall	Santa Clara County Supervisor, 4th District; 2006–present	Incumbent
