= Liz Kniss =

American politician

Mayor of Palo Alto, California
- In office 1994; 2000; 2018

Member of the Palo Alto City Council
- In office 2013 – 2021; 1989 – 2000

Member of the Santa Clara County Board of Supervisors from the 5th district
- In office 2001 – 2013

Personal details
- Born: Cape Cod, Massachusetts, U.S.
- Education: Simmons College (BS); California State University (MPA)

Liz Kniss is an American politician who served as Mayor of Palo Alto, California. Kniss was elected to the Palo Alto City Council in 2012 and 2016. She also serves on the boards of the Bay Area Air Quality Management District and the Family Health Plan of Santa Clara County.

Kniss served three terms as on the Santa Clara County Board of Supervisors in San Jose, California and was president of the board twice in 2005 and 2009.

== Early life and education ==
Kniss was born in Cape Cod, Massachusetts. She earned a Bachelor of Science degree in Nursing from Simmons College (now Simmons University) in Boston and an MPA in Public and Health Care Policy from California State University, East Bay. She has also completed graduate work in Health Policy and Economics at the University of California, Berkeley.

== Career ==
During the 1970s, Kniss worked as a public health nurse for San Mateo County and Cupertino Union School District. Later she was employed as a Marketing and Communications Manager at Sun Microsystems, Inc. until 1999. Her community service includes the League of Women Voters Board of Directors, the United Way Board of Directors, and the Stanford Friends of Nursing.

Kniss began her public work when elected to the Palo Alto Unified School District Board in 1985. She was then elected to the Palo Alto City Council in 1989, where she served three terms and was chosen as Mayor in 1994 and 2000. In 1994, Kniss made Palo Alto the first city in the U.S. with a presence on the Internet and initiated Family Resources, a public-private partnership that provides on-line and on-site social services, job training information and other resources for families in Palo Alto. On the Council, she led efforts to make government more accountable to taxpayers, created new affordable housing and developed a citywide shuttle service to reduce traffic.

In November 2000, Kniss was elected to represent Santa Clara County's Fifth District on the Santa Clara County Board of Supervisors. The Fifth District includes the cities of Cupertino, Los Altos, Los Altos Hills, Monte Sereno, Mountain View, Palo Alto, Saratoga, Stanford, Sunnyvale, the West San Jose neighborhoods, and unincorporated areas of Santa Clara County.

After serving three terms, the maximum allowed at one time, she returned to the Palo Alto City Council. She received nearly 17,500 votes and finished first in the 2012 race. For 2016, she won by a decisive margin, receiving 3,000 more votes than the candidate who finished second. Kniss finished first in 37 of the city's 42 precincts and second in the other five.

Kniss was elected mayor of Palo Alto for a third time in 2018. Later that same year, Kniss revealed she was a survivor of sexual abuse in the 1960s.

Preceded by Joe Simitian	Santa Clara County Supervisor, 5th District; 2000—2012	Succeeded by Joe Simitian
