= Dave Cortese =

American politician in California

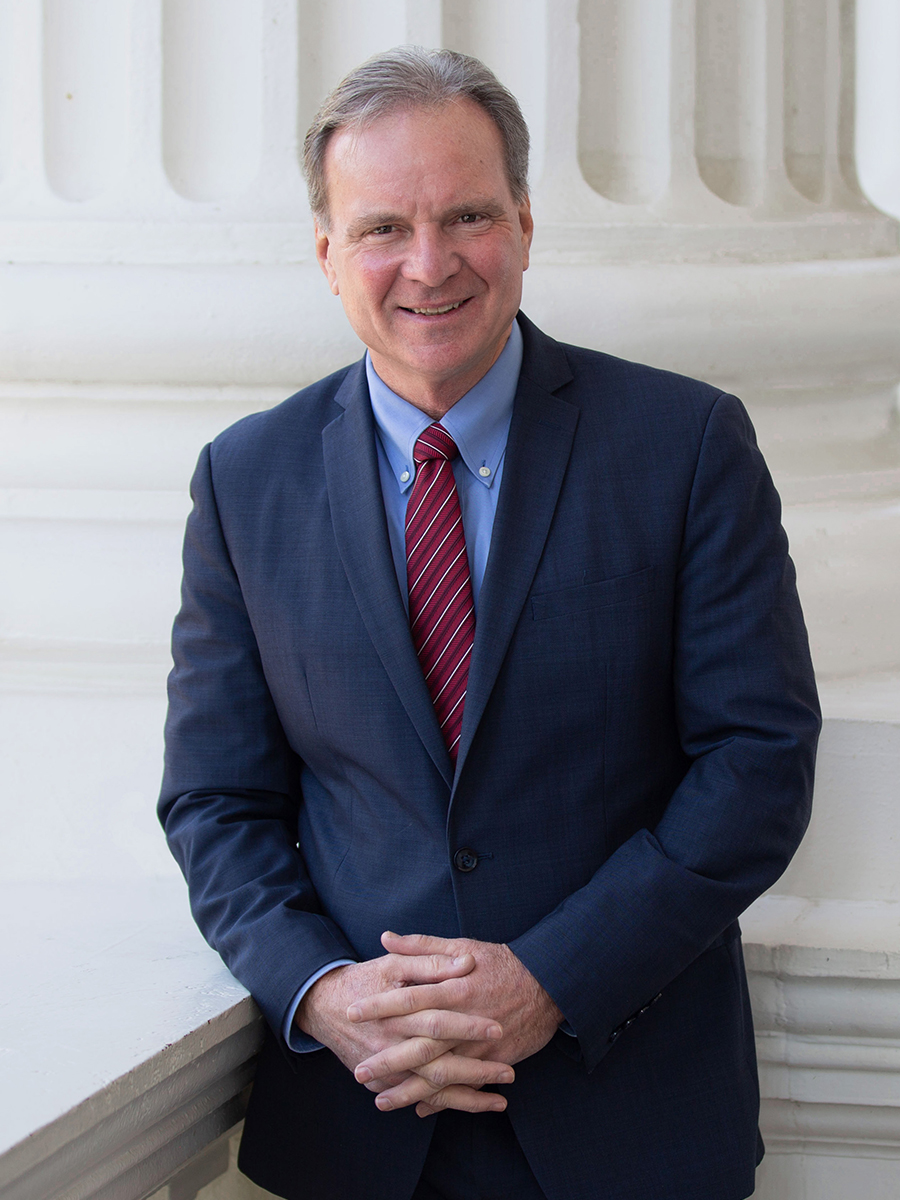
- Official portrait, 2020

Member of the California State Senate from the 15th district
- Incumbent
- Assumed office December 7, 2020
- Preceded by: Jim Beall

Member of the Santa Clara County Board of Supervisors from the 3rd district
- In office 2009–2020
- Preceded by: Pete McHugh
- Succeeded by: Otto Lee

Personal details
- Born: David Dominic Cortese; June 3, 1956 (age 70) Monterey County, California, U.S.
- Party: Democratic
- Spouse: Patricia
- Children: 4
- Relatives: Dominic L. Cortese (father)
- Education: University of California, Davis (BA); Lincoln Law School (JD)

David Dominic Cortese (born June 3, 1956) is an elected official from San Jose, California. He is currently serving in the California State Senate, representing District 15, which encompasses a majority of Santa Clara County. Before being elected to the California State Senate, Cortese served on the Santa Clara County Board of Supervisors for 12 years, as a Councilmember and Vice Mayor for the City of San Jose for eight years, and for eight years as a trustee for the East Side Union High School District in San Jose. Cortese ran for mayor of San Jose and won the primary, losing the general election to District 3 councilmember Sam Liccardo.

== Early life and education ==
Cortese was born on born June 3, 1956. He attended Bellarmine College Preparatory high school (1970–1974). He received his bachelor's degree from the UC Davis and graduated from Lincoln Law School (1991–1995).

== Personal life ==
Cortese is the son of former Santa Clara County Supervisor and California Assembly member Dominic L. Cortese and Suzanne Cortese. Cortese's paternal grandfather, Vince Cortese Sr., was an immigrant farmer from Sicily who found success in agriculture and commercial development. His maternal grandfather, Ed Donovan, was a civic leader and executive of General Motors Credit Corp. who served as a Santa Clara City Councilman in 1949 and 1950. Dave Cortese and his wife, Pattie, who serves on the East Side Union High School District Board, have four children.

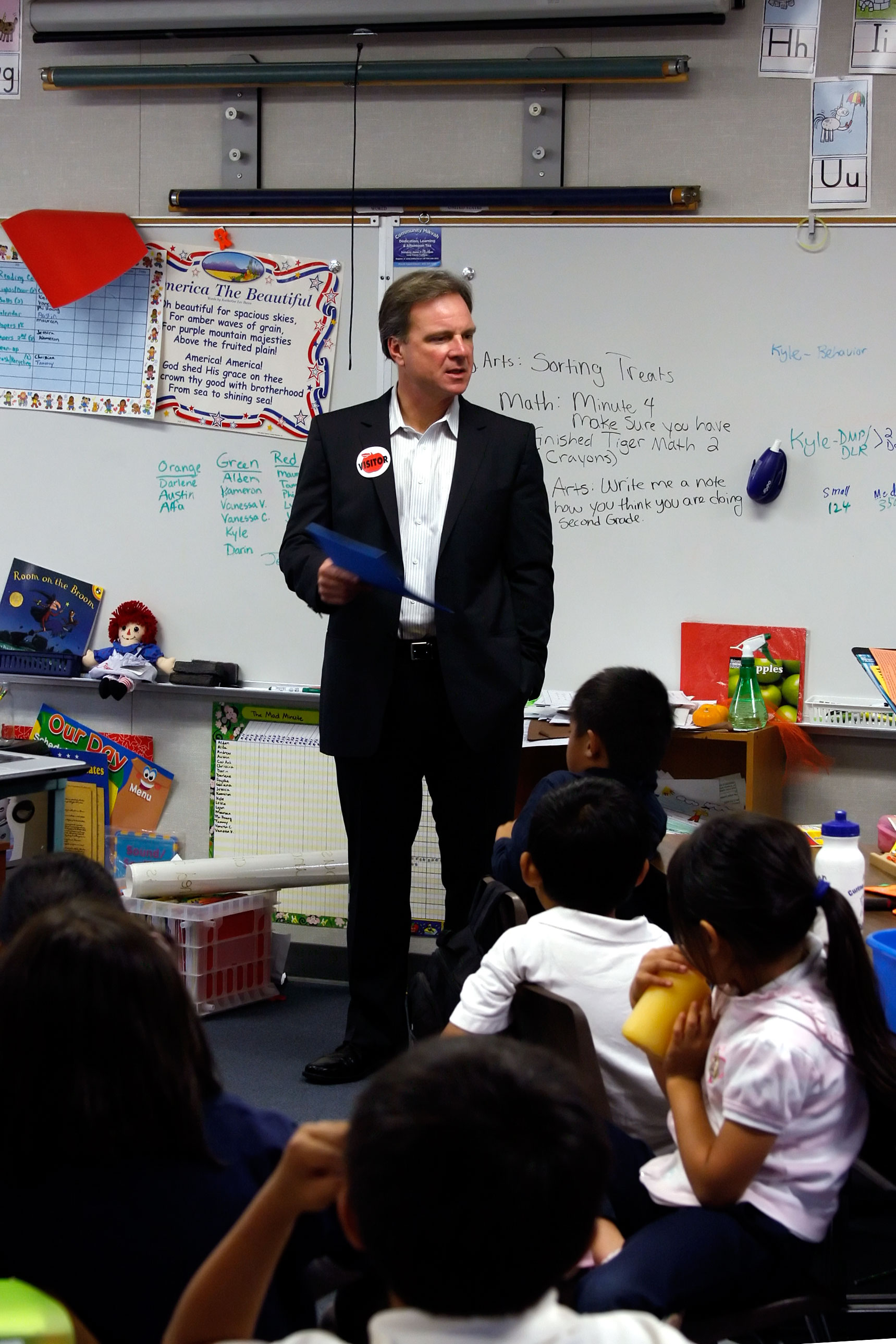
Cortese creates the Silicon Valley Kids Climate Club in 2009

== Legal and business career ==
In 1986, following a tenure as a professional financial manager, Cortese assumed the role of general manager for a collection of enterprises in ranching and real estate. His professional journey includes business endeavors involving the sale of agricultural produce, stewardship of a real estate portfolio, construction, ownership of a dining establishments, and a private law practice.

== Political career ==
Cortese’s leadership positions include serving as Vice Mayor of the City of San Jose, Board President of the Santa Clara County Board of Supervisors, Board President of the East Side Union High School District Board, Chair of the Metropolitan Transportation Commission (MTC), President of the Valley Transportation Authority (VTA), President of the Association of Bay Area Governments (ABAG), President of the Santa Clara County Cities Association (SCCCA), Founder of the Joint Policy Collaborative for Economic Development, Chair of the California Senate Labor, Public Employment & Retirement Committee, President of the San Jose East-Evergreen Rotary Club, Board of Directors for the East Valley YMCA, The Tech Interactive, Parents Helping Parents, and several other nonprofits, as well as a Founding Member of East Valley Girls Softball.

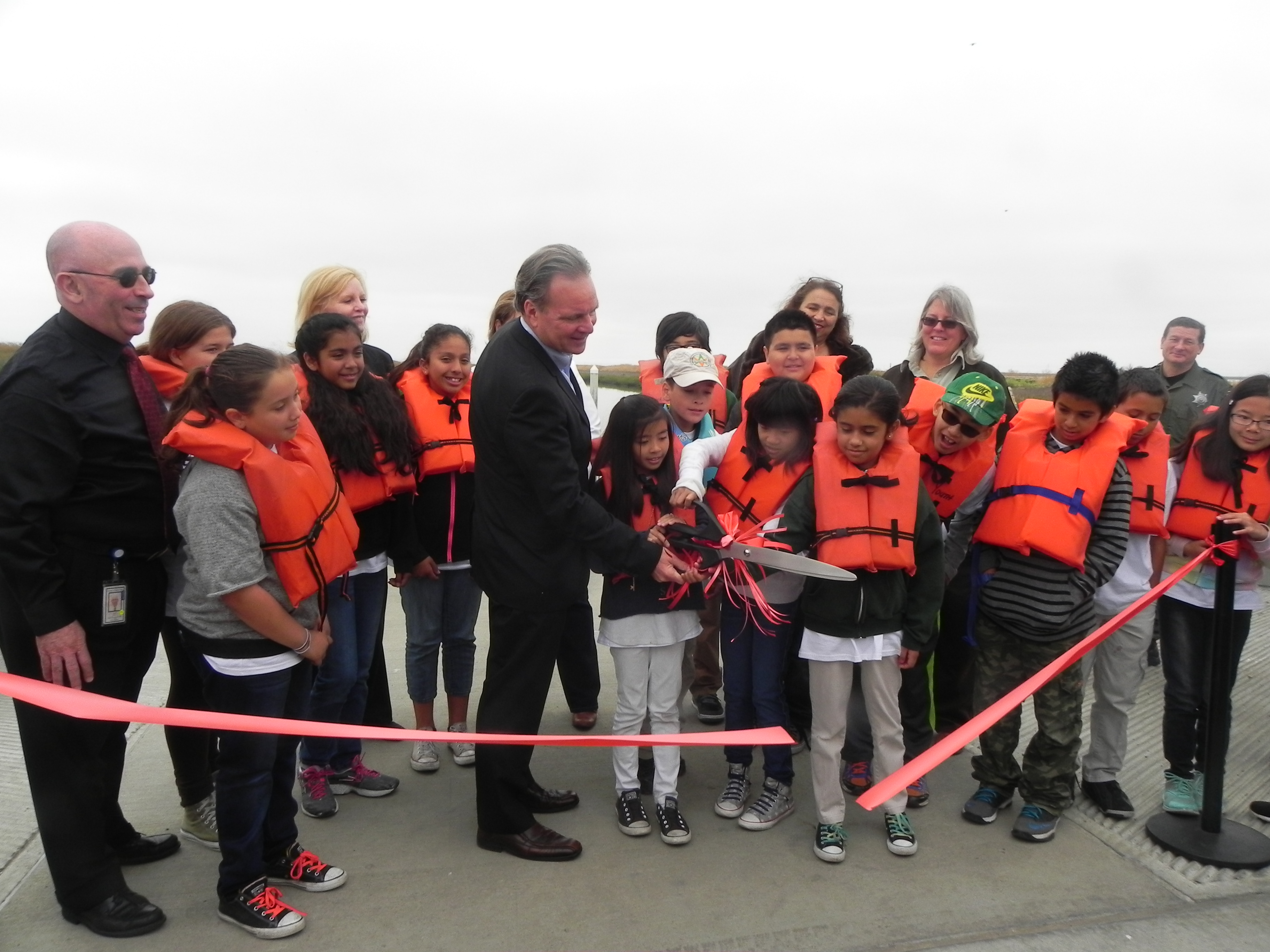
For over a decade, Cortese has hosted the Day on the Bay multicultural resource and health fair

== Electoral history ==
=== San Jose City Council ===
2000 San Jose City Council 8th district election
Primary election
| Party | Candidate | Votes | % |
|---|---|---|---|
| Nonpartisan | Dave Cortese | 7,658 | 45.83 |
| Nonpartisan | Eddie Garcia | 3,843 | 23.00 |
| Nonpartisan | Maria Fuentes | 2,736 | 16.37 |
| Nonpartisan | Patricia Martinez-Roach | 2,472 | 14.79 |
| Total votes | | 16,709 | 100.00 |
General election
| Nonpartisan | Dave Cortese | 17,083 | 65.25 |
| Nonpartisan | Eddie Garcia | 9,507 | 34.75 |
| Total votes | | 26,590 | 100.00 |

2004 San Jose City Council 8th district election
| Party | Candidate | Votes | % |
|---|---|---|---|
| Nonpartisan | Dave Cortese (incumbent) | 12,855 | 100.00 |
| Total votes | | 12,855 | 100.00 |

=== Santa Clara County Board of Supervisors ===
2008 Santa Clara County Board of Supervisors 3rd district election
Primary election
| Party | Candidate | Votes | % |
|---|---|---|---|
| Nonpartisan | Dave Cortese | 17,813 | 42.02 |
| Nonpartisan | Otto Lee | 13,280 | 31.32 |
| Nonpartisan | Jose Esteves | 11,303 | 26.66 |
| Total votes | | 42,396 | 100.00 |
General election
| Nonpartisan | Dave Cortese | 56,845 | 54.87 |
| Nonpartisan | Otto Lee | 46,751 | 45.13 |
| Total votes | | 103,596 | 100.00 |

2012 Santa Clara County Board of Supervisors 3rd district election
| Party | Candidate | Votes | % |
|---|---|---|---|
| Nonpartisan | Dave Cortese (incumbent) | 40,360 | 100.00 |
| Total votes | | 40,360 | 100.00 |

2016 Santa Clara County Board of Supervisors 3rd district election
| Party | Candidate | Votes | % |
|---|---|---|---|
| Nonpartisan | Dave Cortese (incumbent) | 57,088 | 100.00 |
| Total votes | | 57,088 | 100.00 |

=== San José Mayor ===
2006 San Jose mayoral primary
| Party | Candidate | Votes | % |
|---|---|---|---|
| Nonpartisan | Chuck Reed | 36,401 | 28.79 |
| Nonpartisan | Cindy Chavez | 29,295 | 23.17 |
| Nonpartisan | David Pandori | 22,581 | 17.86 |
| Nonpartisan | Dave Cortese | 20,691 | 16.37 |
| Nonpartisan | Michael Mulcahy | 13,580 | 10.74 |
| Nonpartisan | John Candeias | 1,100 | 0.87 |
| Nonpartisan | Timmothy K. Fitzgerald | 1,032 | 0.82 |
| Nonpartisan | Michael C Macarelli | 654 | 0.52 |
| Nonpartisan | Larry Flores | 653 | 0.52 |
| Nonpartisan | Jose Aurelio Hernandez | 441 | 0.35 |
| Total votes | | 126,428 | 100.00 |

2014 San Jose mayoral election
Primary election
| Party | Candidate | Votes | % |
|---|---|---|---|
| Nonpartisan | Dave Cortese | 43,887 | 33.72 |
| Nonpartisan | Sam Liccardo | 33,521 | 25.75 |
| Nonpartisan | Madison Nguyen | 26,365 | 20.26 |
| Nonpartisan | Pierluigi Oliverio | 13,197 | 10.14 |
| Nonpartisan | Rose Herrera | 7,950 | 6.11 |
| Nonpartisan | Mike Alvarado | 1,959 | 1.51 |
| Nonpartisan | Timothy Harrison | 1,715 | 1.32 |
| Nonpartisan | Bill Chew | 1,563 | 1.20 |
| Total votes | | 130,157 | 100.00 |
General election
| Nonpartisan | Sam Liccardo | 91,840 | 50.76 |
| Nonpartisan | Dave Cortese | 89,090 | 49.24 |
| Total votes | | 180,930 | 100.00 |

=== California State Senate ===
2020 California State Senate 15th district election
Primary election
| Party | Candidate | Votes | % |
|---|---|---|---|
| Democratic | Dave Cortese | 79,507 | 33.9 |
| Democratic | Ann Ravel | 51,752 | 22.1 |
| Democratic | Nora Campos | 39,683 | 16.9 |
| Republican | Robert Howell | 23,840 | 10.2 |
| No party preference | Johnny Khamis | 23,747 | 10.1 |
| Republican | Ken Del Valle | 14,280 | 6.1 |
| No party preference | Tim Gildersleeve | 1,635 | 0.7 |
| Total votes | | 234,444 | 100.0 |
General election
| Democratic | Dave Cortese | 212,207 | 54.8 |
| Democratic | Ann M. Ravel | 175,203 | 45.2 |
| Total votes | | 387,410 | 100.0 |
| Democratic hold | | | |

2024 California State Senate 15th district election
Primary election
| Party | Candidate | Votes | % |
|---|---|---|---|
| Democratic | Dave Cortese (incumbent) | 124,539 | 69.0 |
| Republican | Robert Howell | 34,205 | 19.0 |
| Republican | Tony Loaiza | 21,643 | 12.0 |
| Total votes | | 180,387 | 100.0 |
General election
| Democratic | Dave Cortese (incumbent) | 260,719 | 68.6 |
| Republican | Robert Howell | 119,310 | 31.4 |
| Total votes | | 380,029 | 100.0 |
| Democratic hold | | | |

== See also ==
- 2006 San Jose mayoral election
- 2014 San Jose mayoral election
