= Santa Clara County Board of Supervisors =

Governing body in California

Type
- Type: Unicameral
- Term limits: 3 terms (12 years)

Leadership
- President: Susan Ellenberg

Structure
- Seats: 5
- Political groups: Officially nonpartisan: Democratic (5)
- Length of term: 4 years
- Salary: $192,686 (2023)

Elections
- Voting system: Two-round system in Single-member districts
- Last election: November 5, 2024
- Next election: November 3, 2026

Meeting place
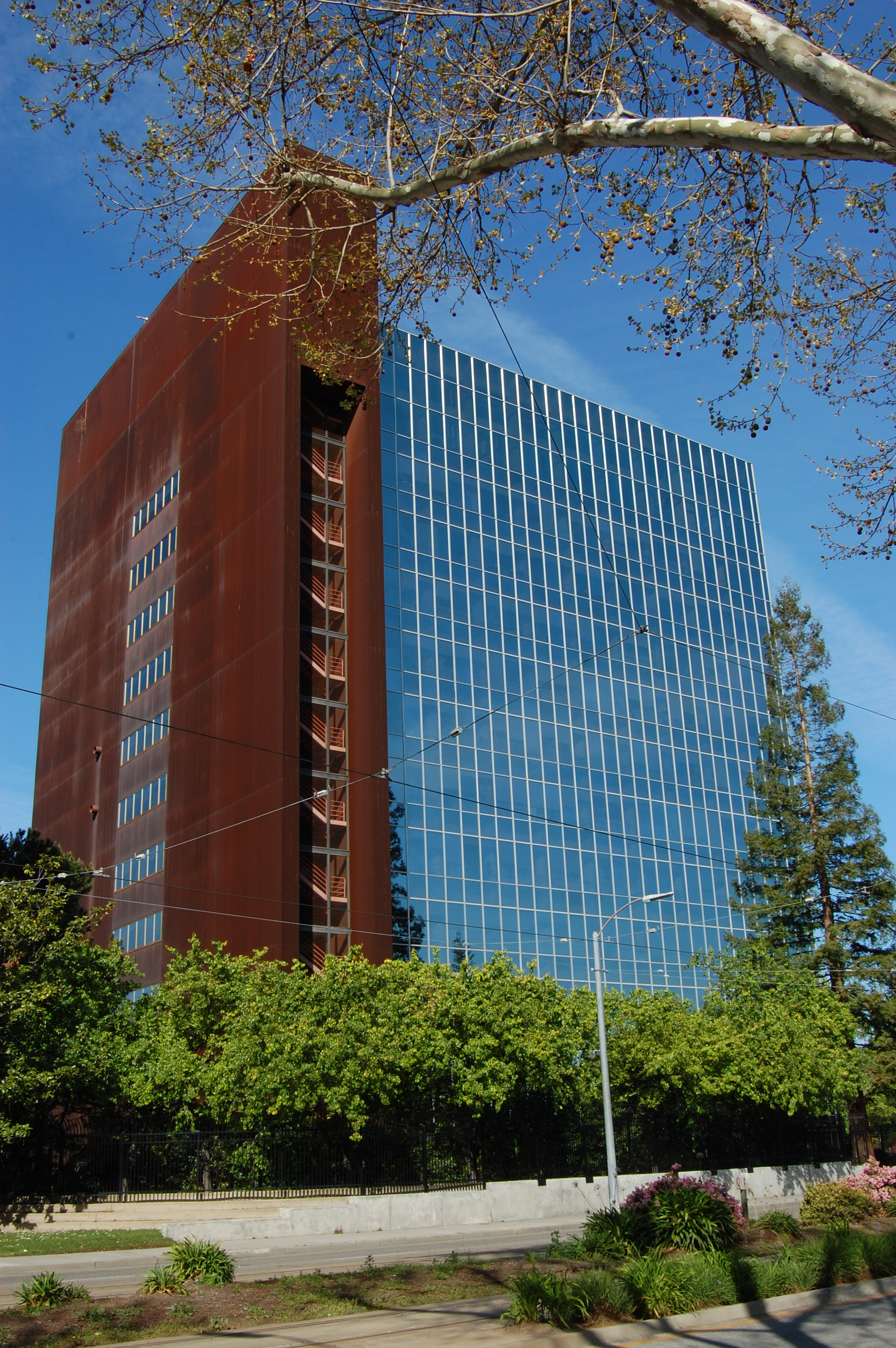
- Santa Clara County Government Center; San Jose, California

Website
- Santa Clara County Board of Supervisors

The Santa Clara County Board of Supervisors is the board of supervisors governing Santa Clara County, California. It is made of elected representatives from each of the county's five districts. As a result of the 2022 elections, members of the Democratic Party hold all seats on the board though it is officially nonpartisan.

== Governance and duties ==
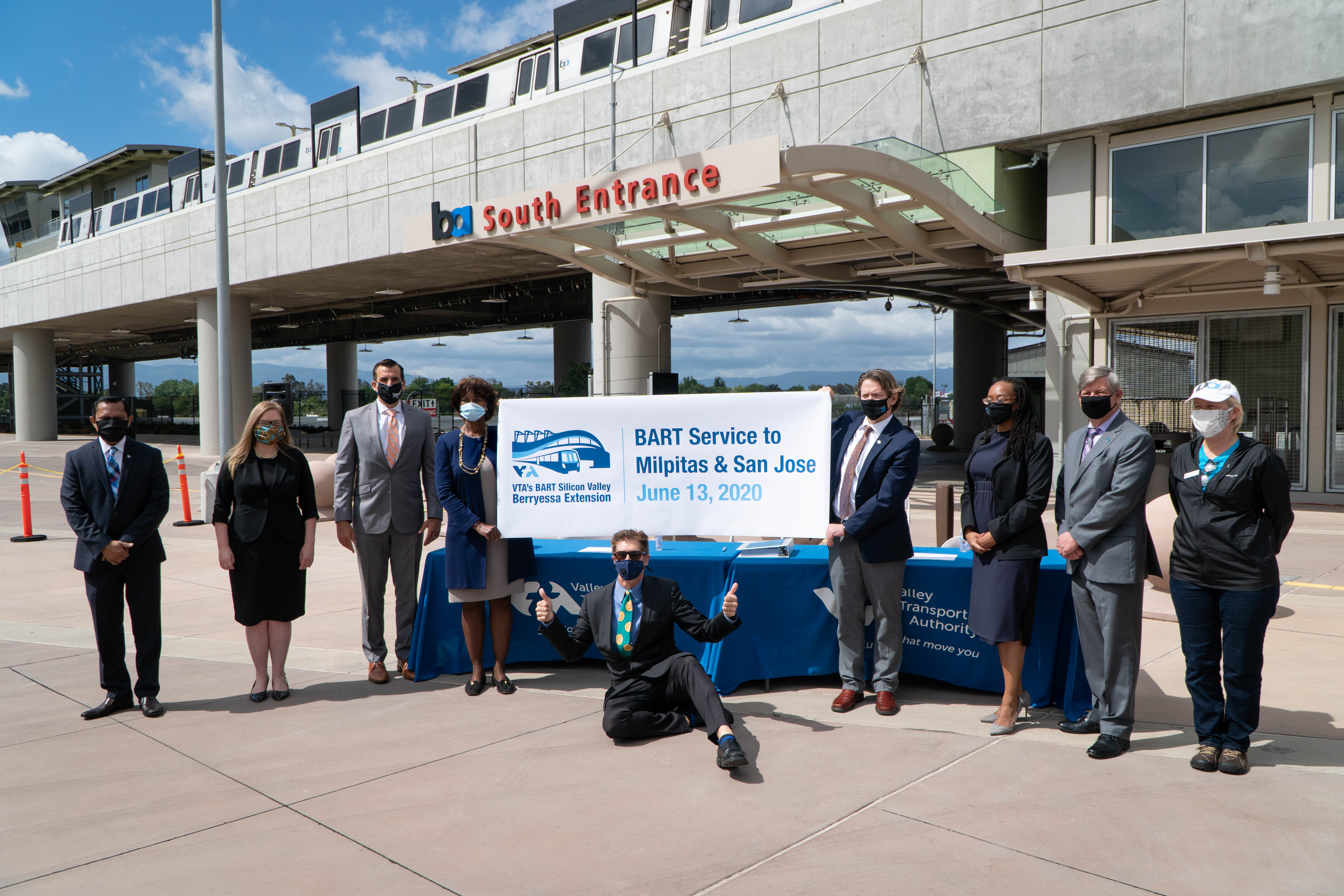
The Members of the Board of Supervisors celebrate the opening of BART's Berryessa/North San José station in 2020.

The Board of Supervisors is responsible for overseeing the operation of government and laws concerning Santa Clara County.

=== Salaries ===
Members of the Santa Clara Board of Supervisors are paid a total salary of $192,686 per year as of 2023.

=== Committees ===
- Children, Seniors and Families Committee (CSFC)
- Finance and Government Operations Committee (FGOC)
- Health and Hospital Committee (HHC)
- Housing, Land Use, Environment and Transportation Committee (HLUET)
- Public Safety and Justice Committee (PSJC)
- Federal Affairs Advocacy Task Force

== Elections ==
Members of the Board of Supervisors are elected to four year terms from one of the five single member districts using a Two-round system. Candidates are officially listed on the ballot as nonpartisan, but are usually affiliated with a political party.

=== 2024 ===
Incumbent supervisors Cindy Chavez and Joe Simitian were term-limited. Betty Duong and Margaret Abe-Koga were elected in their respective seats.

=== 2022 ===
Incumbent District 1 supervisor Mike Wasserman was term-limited and Incumbent District 4 supervisor Susan Ellenberg was eligible to seek re-election.

== History ==
Santa Clara County received media attention in the 1980s as the "feminist capital of the nation" because of significant amounts of women in elected positions, including a majority of the Board of Supervisors from 1980 to 1985. Following the 2024 elections, the board was majority Asian-American for the first time and majority women for the second time.

=== Previous membership ===
Notable previous Supervisors include:

- Cindy Chavez (2013–2024)
- Dave Cortese (2008–2020)
- Ken Yeager 2006–2018)
- Liz Kniss (2001–2012)
- Blanca Alvarado (1994–2008)
- Jim Beall (1994–2006)
- Mike Honda (1991–1996)
- Ron Gonzales (1989–1996)
- Zoe Lofgren (1981–1994)
- Becky Morgan (1981–1984)
- Rod Diridon Sr. (1975–1994)
- Dan McCorquodale (1973–1982)
- Victor Calvo (1969–1974)
- Dominic L. Cortese (1969–1980)

=== 5 members elected by district (2010–present) ===
Year	District				
Year	1	2	3	4	5
2010	Mike Wasserman	George Shirakawa	Dave Cortese	Ken Yeager	Liz Kniss
2011	Mike Wasserman	George Shirakawa	Dave Cortese	Ken Yeager	Liz Kniss
2012	Mike Wasserman	George Shirakawa	Dave Cortese	Ken Yeager	Liz Kniss
2013	Mike Wasserman	George Shirakawa	Dave Cortese	Ken Yeager	Joe Simitian
2014	Mike Wasserman	Cindy Chavez	Dave Cortese	Ken Yeager	Joe Simitian
2015	Mike Wasserman	Cindy Chavez	Dave Cortese	Ken Yeager	Joe Simitian
2016	Mike Wasserman	Cindy Chavez	Dave Cortese	Ken Yeager	Joe Simitian
2017	Mike Wasserman	Cindy Chavez	Dave Cortese	Ken Yeager	Joe Simitian
2018	Mike Wasserman	Cindy Chavez	Dave Cortese	Ken Yeager	Joe Simitian
2019	Mike Wasserman	Cindy Chavez	Dave Cortese	Susan Ellenberg	Joe Simitian
2020	Mike Wasserman	Cindy Chavez	Dave Cortese	Susan Ellenberg	Joe Simitian
2021	Mike Wasserman	Cindy Chavez	Otto Lee	Susan Ellenberg	Joe Simitian
2022	Mike Wasserman	Cindy Chavez	Otto Lee	Susan Ellenberg	Joe Simitian
2023	Sylvia Arenas	Cindy Chavez	Otto Lee	Susan Ellenberg	Joe Simitian
2024	Sylvia Arenas	Cindy Chavez	Otto Lee	Susan Ellenberg	Joe Simitian
2025	Sylvia Arenas	Betty Duong	Otto Lee	Susan Ellenberg	Margaret Abe-Koga

== Districts ==
Members of the Board of Supervisors are elected from 5 single-member districts every four years, with a limit of three consecutive terms.

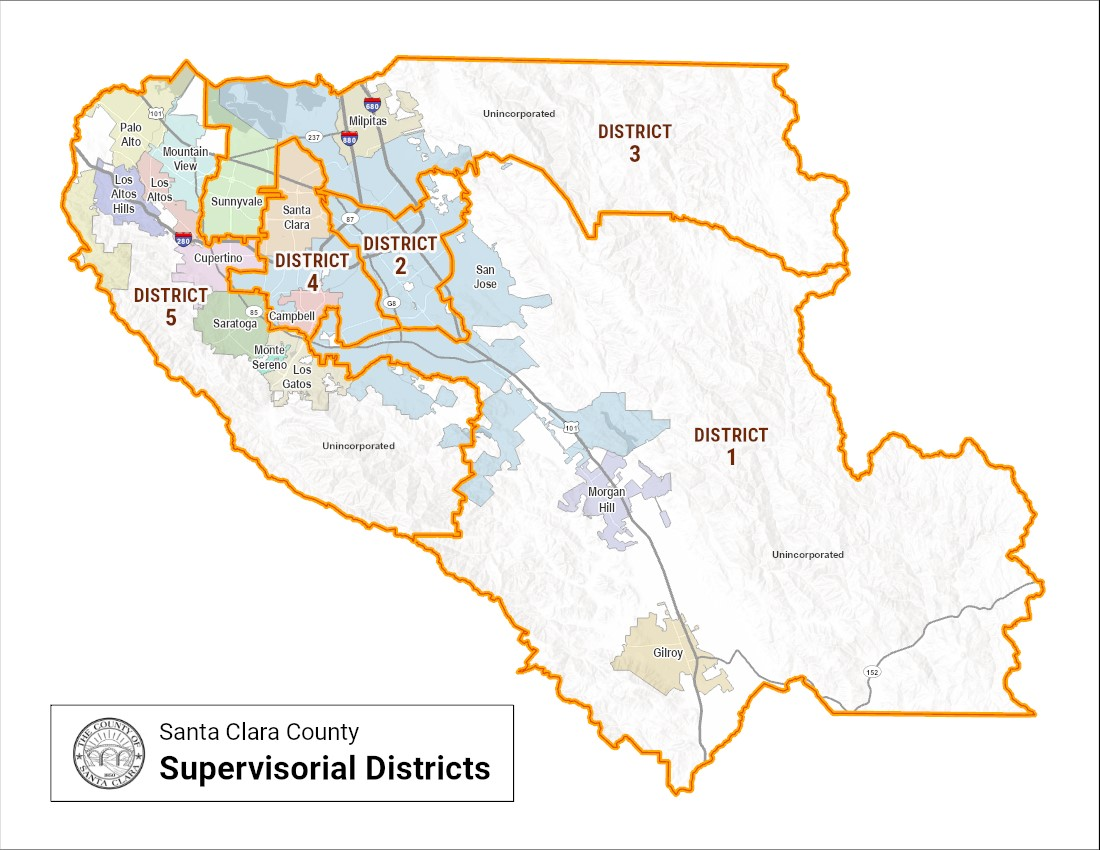
Board of Supervisors districts following 2020 redistricting.

District	Supervisor	Cities and areas represented	Party (officially nonpartisan)
District 1	Sylvia Arenas	Gilroy, Morgan Hill, San Jose (East San Jose, South San Jose)	Democratic
District 2	Betty Duong	San Jose (Downtown San Jose, East San Jose)	Democratic
District 3	Otto Lee	Milpitas, Sunnyvale, San Jose (North San Jose)	Democratic
District 4	Susan Ellenberg	Campbell, San Jose (West San Jose), Santa Clara	Democratic
District 5	Margaret Abe-Koga	Cupertino, Los Altos, Los Altos Hills, Los Gatos, Monte Sereno, Mountain View, Palo Alto, San Jose (Almaden), Saratoga	Democratic
