= Jeffrey Morgan =

Jeffrey Morgan may refer to:

- Jeffrey Morgan (writer), Canadian writer
- Jeffrey Morgan (musician) (born 1954), American jazz musician and composer
- Jeffrey Dean Morgan (born 1966), American actor
- Jeff Morgan, American businessman
- Jeff Morgan (vintner), American winemaker
