= 2000 United States Senate election in California =

- November 7, 2000
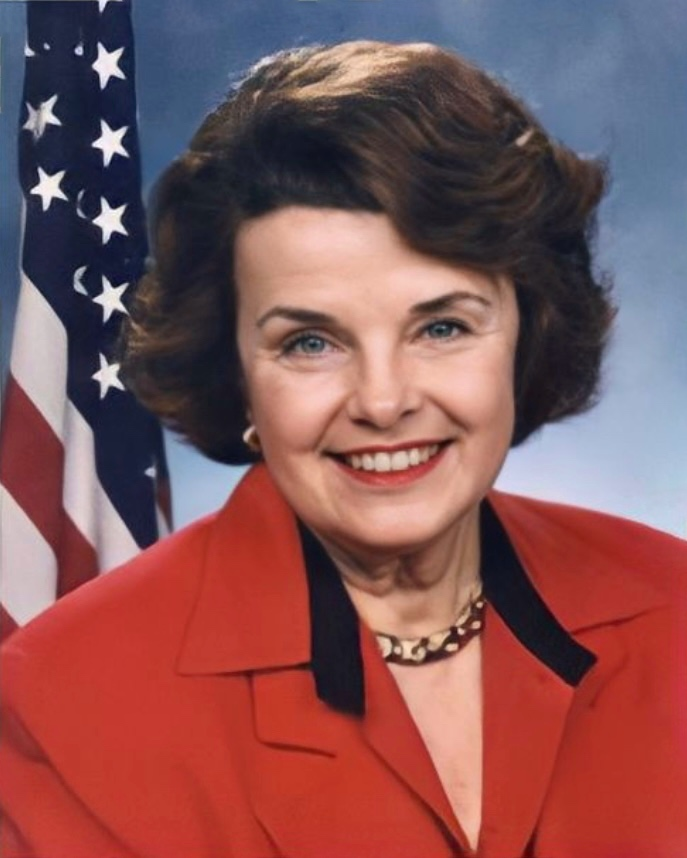

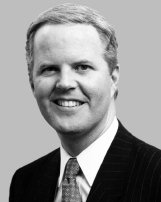
Nominee	Dianne Feinstein	Tom Campbell
Party	Democratic	Republican
Popular vote	5,932,522	3,886,853
Percentage	55.84%	36.59%
- Feinstein: 40–50% 50–60% 60–70% 70–80% Campbell: 40–50% 50–60% 60–70%
U.S. senator before election
Dianne Feinstein
Democratic
Elected U.S. Senator
Dianne Feinstein
Democratic

The 2000 U.S. Senate election in California was held on November 7, 2000. Democrat incumbent Dianne Feinstein ran for re-election to a third term in office and defeated Republican congressman Tom Campbell.

== Democratic primary ==
=== Candidates ===
- Dianne Feinstein, incumbent U.S. senator since 1992
- Michael Schmier, Emeryville attorney and 1998 candidate for California attorney general

=== Results ===
2000 U.S. Senate Democratic primary
Party	Candidate	Votes	%
Democratic	Dianne Feinstein (incumbent)	3,759,560	95.50%
Democratic	Michael Schmier	181,104	4.50%
Total votes		3,940,664	100.00%

== Republican primary ==
=== Candidates ===
- John M. Brown
- Tom Campbell, U.S. representative from Campbell
- Linh Dao
- James Peter Gough
- Bill Horn, San Diego County supervisor
- Ray Haynes, state senator from Murrieta

=== Results ===
2000 U.S. Senate Republican Party primary in California
Party	Candidate	Votes	%
Republican	Tom Campbell	1,697,208	56.17%
Republican	Ray Haynes	679,034	22.47%
Republican	Bill Horn	453,630	15.01%
Republican	John M. Brown	68,415	2.26%
Republican	Linh Dao	64,559	2.14%
Republican	James Peter Gough	58,853	1.95%
Total votes		3,021,699	100.00%

== Other nominations ==
=== Green ===
2000 U.S. Senate Green Party primary in California
Party	Candidate	Votes	%
Green	Medea Benjamin	99,716	73.95%
Green	Jan B. Tucker	35,124	26.05%
Total votes		134,840	100.00%

=== Reform ===
2000 U.S. Senate Reform Party primary in California
Party	Candidate	Votes	%
Reform	Jose Luis Olivares Camahort	46,278	70.34%
Reform	Valli "Sharp" Sharpe	19,516	29.66%
Total votes		65,794	100.00%

=== Libertarian ===
2000 Libertarian U.S. Senate primary
Party	Candidate	Votes	%
Libertarian	Gail Lightfoot	120,622	100.00%
Total votes		120,622	100.00%

=== American Independent ===
2000 American Independent U.S. Senate primary
Party	Candidate	Votes	%
American Independent	Diane Beall Templin	38,836	100.00%
Total votes		38,836	100.00%

=== Natural Law ===
2000 Natural Law U.S. Senate primary
Party	Candidate	Votes	%
Natural Law	Brian M. Rees	26,382	100.00%
Total votes		26,382	100.00%

== General election ==
=== Candidates ===
- Medea Benjamin, co-founder of Global Exchange (Green)
- Jose Luis Olivares Camahort (Reform)
- Tom Campbell, U.S. representative from Campbell (Republican)
- Dianne Feinstein, incumbent U.S. senator since 1992 (Democratic)
- Gail Lightfoot (Libertarian)
- Brian M. Rees (Natural Law)
- Diane Beal Templin (American Independent)

=== Campaign ===
Despite touting his service as a moderate Republican representing a strongly Democratic district, Campbell was underfunded and a decided underdog against the popular, heavily financed Feinstein. By February, he spent barely $1 million without any PAC money. Campbell generally supported gay rights and abortion. He also opposed the war on drugs and called himself a "maverick", similar to Arizona senator John McCain.

=== Debates ===
- Complete video of debate, October 24, 2000
- Complete video of debate, October 27, 2000

=== Polling ===
Poll source	Date(s)	Sample size	Margin of error	Dianne Feinstein (D)	Tom Campbell (R)	Other / undecided (Note: Calculated by taking the difference of 100% and all other candidates combined.)
Harris Insights & Analytics	November 3, 2000	24,965	—	52%	40%	8%
SurveyUSA	November 1, 2000	530	—	53%	41%	6%
Research 2000	October 31, 2000	820	—	54%	39%	7%
Field Research Corp. (Field Poll)	October 29, 2000	900	—	52%	32%	16%
Rasmussen Reports	October 29, 2000	1,536	—	48%	38%	14%
Research 2000	October 24, 2000	822	—	53%	38%	9%
Los Angeles Times	October 21, 2000	852	—	60%	35%	5%

=== Results ===
2000 U.S. Senate election in California
Party	Candidate	Votes	%
Democratic	Dianne Feinstein (incumbent)	5,932,522	55.84%
Republican	Tom Campbell	3,886,853	36.59%
Green	Medea Susan Benjamin	326,828	3.08%
Libertarian	Gail Lightfoot	187,718	1.77%
American Independent	Diane Beall Templin	134,598	1.27%
Reform	Jose Luis Olivares Camahort	96,552	0.91%
Natural Law	Brian M. Rees	58,537	0.55%
Invalid or blank votes		519,233	4.66%
Total votes		11,142,841	100.00%
Turnout			51.92
Democratic hold			

==== Results by county ====
Green Party candidate Medea Susan Benjamin finished second ahead of Tom Campbell in six municipalities, mostly in the San Francisco Bay Area: Oakland, Emeryville, Albany, Fairfax, Berkeley, and Arcata. She tied with Jones for second place in Point Arena with 21.7 percent of the vote.

County	Feinstein		Campbell		Benjamin		Others	
County	Share	Votes	Share	Votes	Share	Votes	Share	Votes
Alameda	67.66%	328,355	22.57%	109,517	6.74%	32,701	3.03%	14,726
Alpine	43.62%	253	41.72%	242	4.48%	26	10.17%	59
Amador	43.85%	6,671	49.32%	7,502	1.70%	259	5.13%	780
Butte	41.52%	34,117	47.41%	38,961	5.52%	4,540	5.54%	4,555
Calaveras	42.31%	7,852	48.42%	8,986	2.42%	449	6.85%	1,271
Colusa	41.16%	2,250	53.70%	2,936	0.91%	50	4.23%	231
Contra Costa	61.60%	232,109	33.23%	125,188	2.30%	8,670	2.87%	10,821
Del Norte	44.91%	3,670	44.93%	3,672	3.10%	253	7.06%	577
El Dorado	40.70%	28,873	51.72%	36,684	2.52%	1,785	5.06%	3,591
Fresno	52.87%	113,228	40.39%	86,502	1.50%	3,210	5.25%	11,235
Glenn	38.18%	3,282	54.26%	4,664	1.54%	132	6.03%	518
Humboldt	46.99%	25,788	36.23%	19,882	11.20%	6,145	5.59%	3,069
Imperial	56.17%	15,937	34.07%	9,666	1.62%	461	8.14%	2,311
Inyo	35.15%	2,711	57.02%	4,397	2.71%	209	5.12%	395
Kern	43.26%	77,676	50.44%	90,564	1.09%	1,949	5.21%	9,360
Kings	48.49%	13,402	44.31%	12,246	0.93%	256	6.28%	1,735
Lake	54.74%	11,410	37.55%	7,826	3.15%	656	4.56%	951
Lassen	35.56%	3,673	54.39%	5,618	1.60%	165	8.46%	874
Los Angeles	64.40%	1,677,668	28.55%	743,872	2.78%	72,312	4.28%	111,402
Madera	43.55%	14,123	48.75%	15,810	1.70%	550	6.01%	1,950
Marin	65.25%	79,421	26.35%	32,077	6.33%	7,699	2.07%	2,524
Mariposa	40.49%	3,195	48.63%	3,837	2.72%	215	8.15%	643
Mendocino	50.99%	16,981	31.54%	10,503	12.14%	4,044	5.32%	1,773
Merced	51.92%	25,426	40.04%	19,612	1.47%	721	6.57%	3,216
Modoc	30.81%	1,221	60.91%	2,414	1.56%	62	6.71%	266
Mono	42.56%	1,818	47.68%	2,037	4.12%	176	5.64%	241
Monterey	57.96%	67,401	35.36%	41,113	2.94%	3,420	3.74%	4,350
Napa	56.70%	28,884	36.20%	18,442	3.24%	1,652	3.85%	1,961
Nevada	41.41%	19,354	49.41%	23,095	4.78%	2,235	4.40%	2,057
Orange	42.72%	403,123	49.95%	471,410	1.85%	17,452	5.48%	51,743
Placer	40.95%	47,169	52.25%	60,182	1.97%	2,264	4.83%	5,569
Plumas	40.76%	4,075	51.23%	5,122	2.57%	257	5.44%	544
Riverside	48.28%	210,235	44.80%	195,085	1.52%	6,632	5.39%	23,484
Sacramento	54.27%	228,992	38.71%	163,343	2.61%	11,001	4.41%	18,623
San Benito	55.04%	9,170	39.29%	6,545	1.83%	305	3.84%	640
San Bernardino	49.13%	200,558	43.40%	177,158	1.81%	7,376	5.67%	23,145
San Diego	51.34%	466,461	40.76%	370,287	2.24%	20,340	5.66%	51,443
San Francisco	72.26%	222,787	15.27%	47,072	10.50%	32,377	1.97%	6,082
San Joaquin	52.65%	86,731	41.23%	67,907	1.29%	2,130	4.83%	7,954
San Luis Obispo	45.14%	47,976	46.15%	49,055	3.59%	3,814	5.13%	5,448
San Mateo	64.80%	165,216	29.92%	76,273	2.85%	7,278	2.43%	6,191
Santa Barbara	49.93%	75,357	40.03%	60,417	5.78%	8,718	4.26%	6,422
Santa Clara	59.62%	320,400	34.97%	187,953	2.29%	12,329	3.12%	16,747
Santa Cruz	56.78%	60,853	30.36%	32,537	9.63%	10,321	3.22%	3,453
Shasta	36.84%	24,027	55.01%	35,884	1.56%	1,016	6.59%	4,299
Sierra	36.63%	666	53.91%	980	2.59%	47	6.88%	125
Siskiyou	38.40%	7,476	51.61%	10,048	2.14%	417	7.85%	1,529
Solano	60.03%	74,414	33.43%	41,449	1.87%	2,316	4.67%	5,791
Sonoma	60.96%	118,455	29.46%	57,244	6.05%	11,765	3.52%	6,839
Stanislaus	48.24%	60,610	44.51%	55,919	1.54%	1,937	5.71%	7,171
Sutter	39.51%	10,326	55.08%	14,394	1.10%	288	4.30%	1,125
Tehama	38.27%	7,870	52.81%	10,859	1.42%	291	7.50%	1,543
Trinity	40.35%	2,307	48.47%	2,771	4.62%	264	6.56%	375
Tulare	45.52%	40,117	47.19%	41,587	1.02%	901	6.26%	5,519
Tuolumne	42.97%	10,028	48.78%	11,385	2.40%	560	5.85%	1,366
Ventura	50.22%	138,836	42.85%	118,463	2.20%	6,073	4.73%	13,067
Yolo	58.18%	35,193	32.28%	19,528	5.06%	3,060	4.48%	2,709
Yuba	40.18%	6,345	51.49%	8,131	1.88%	297	6.44%	1,017

==== Counties that flipped from Republican to Democratic ====
- Fresno (largest town: Fresno)
- Imperial (largest municipality: El Centro)
- Kings (largest municipality: Avenal)
- Lake (largest municipality: Clearlake)
- Merced (largest community: Merced)
- Riverside (largest city: Riverside)
- San Bernardino (largest town: San Bernardino)
- San Benito (largest town: Hollister)
- San Diego (largest community: San Diego)
- San Joaquin (largest city: Stockton)
- Stanislaus (largest community: Modesto)
- Ventura (largest city: Ventura)

==== By congressional district ====
Feinstein won 43 of 52 congressional districts, including 11 that elected Republicans.

District	Feinstein	Campbell	Representative
1st	53%	36%	Mike Thompson
2nd	40%	51%	Wally Herger
3rd	49%	43%	Doug Ose
4th	42%	51%	John Doolittle
5th	62%	31%	Bob Matsui
6th	63%	28%	Lynn Woolsey
7th	69%	24%	George Miller
8th	73%	14%	Nancy Pelosi
9th	73%	12%	Barbara Lee
10th	56%	40%	Ellen Tauscher
11th	52%	42%	Richard Pombo
12th	68%	26%	Tom Lantos
13th	67%	27%	Pete Stark
14th	61%	33%	Anna Eshoo
15th	55%	40%	Tom Campbell
15th	55%	40%	Mike Honda
16th	64%	30%	Zoe Lofgren
17th	58%	33%	Sam Farr
18th	49%	44%	Gary Condit
19th	48%	45%	George Radanovich
20th	58%	35%	Cal Dooley
21st	40%	53%	Bill Thomas
22nd	51%	41%	Lois Capps
23rd	48%	47%	Elton Gallegly
24th	59%	35%	Brad Sherman
25th	47%	46%	Buck McKeon
26th	70%	22%	Howard Berman
27th	57%	36%	Jim Rogan
27th	57%	36%	Adam Schiff
28th	51%	42%	David Dreier
29th	70%	21%	Henry Waxman
30th	73%	17%	Xavier Becerra
31st	70%	22%	Matthew G. Martínez
31st	70%	22%	Hilda Solis
32nd	82%	12%	Diane Watson
33rd	82%	11%	Lucille Roybal-Allard
34th	69%	24%	Grace Napolitano
35th	86%	10%	Maxine Waters
36th	53%	39%	Steven T. Kuykendall
36th	53%	39%	Jane Harman
37th	83%	12%	Juanita Millender-McDonald
38th	60%	33%	Steve Horn
39th	46%	47%	Ed Royce
40th	42%	50%	Jerry Lewis
41st	48%	45%	Gary Miller
42nd	58%	34%	Joe Baca
43rd	47%	46%	Ken Calvert
44th	51%	43%	Mary Bono
45th	42%	50%	Dana Rohrabacher
46th	55%	36%	Loretta Sánchez
47th	41%	52%	Christopher Cox
48th	39%	53%	Ron Packard
48th	39%	53%	Darrell Issa
49th	59%	34%	Brian Bilbray
49th	59%	34%	Susan Davis
50th	64%	28%	Bob Filner
51st	46%	47%	Duke Cunningham
52nd	47%	44%	Duncan Hunter

== See also ==
- 2000 United States Senate elections
