= Tom Campbell (California politician) =

American educator and politician (born 1952)

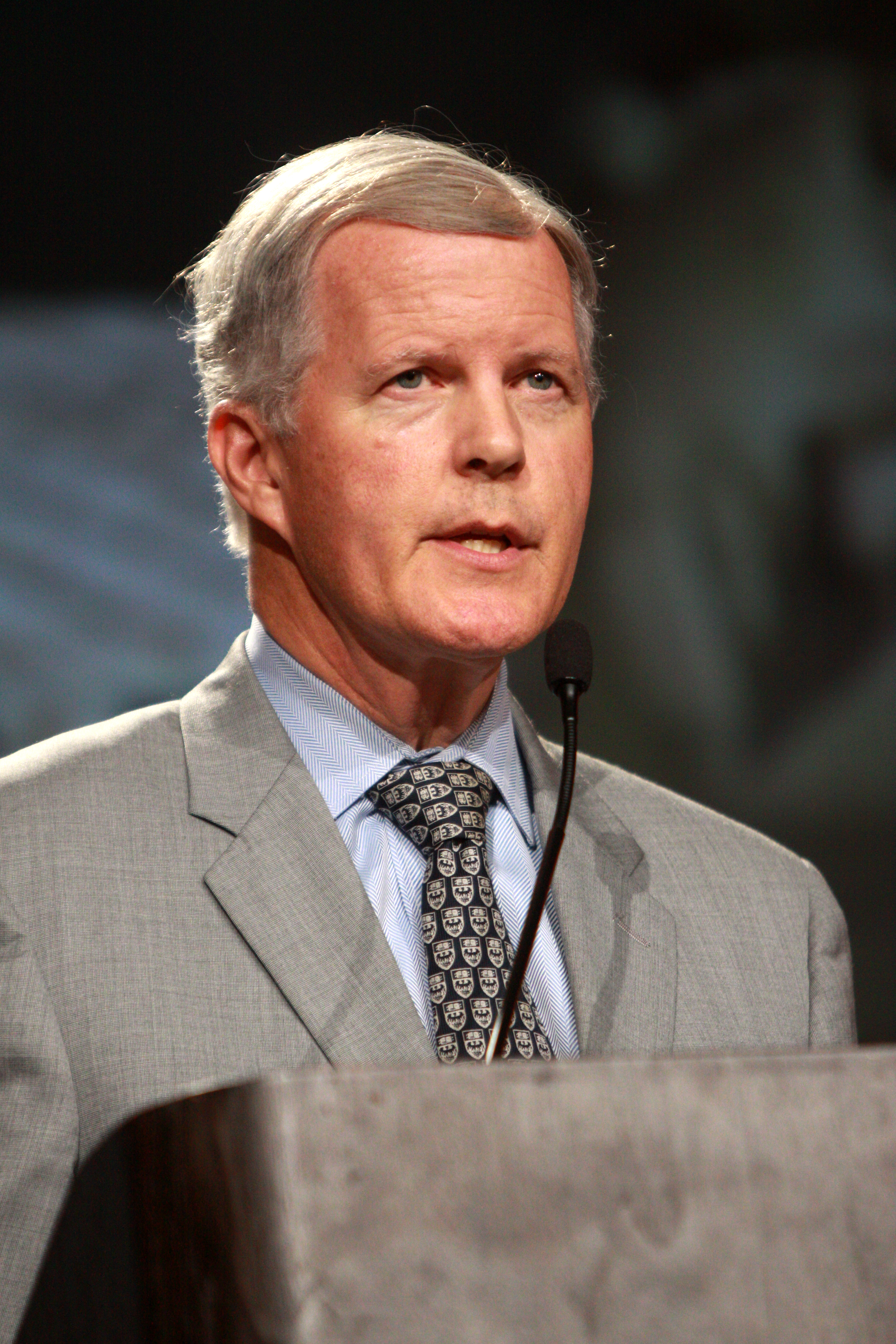
- Campbell in 2013

Dean of the Chapman University School of Law
- In office 2011–2016
- Preceded by: John Eastman
- Succeeded by: Matthew Parlow

Director of the California Department of Finance
- In office December 1, 2004 – November 10, 2005
- Governor: Arnold Schwarzenegger
- Preceded by: Donna Arduin
- Succeeded by: Michael Genest

Dean of the Haas School of Business
- In office 2002–2008
- Preceded by: Laura Tyson
- Succeeded by: Richard Lyons

Member of the U.S. House of Representatives from California
- In office December 12, 1995 – January 3, 2001 (Note: Campbell's official service begins on the date of the special election, while he was not sworn in until December 15, 1995.)
- Preceded by: Norman Mineta
- Succeeded by: Mike Honda
- Constituency: 15th district
- In office January 3, 1989 – January 3, 1993
- Preceded by: Ernie Konnyu
- Succeeded by: Anna Eshoo (redistricted)
- Constituency: 12th district

Member of the California Senate from the 11th district
- In office November 11, 1993 – December 12, 1995
- Preceded by: Becky Morgan
- Succeeded by: Byron Sher

Personal details
- Born: Thomas John Campbell; August 14, 1952 (age 74) Chicago, Illinois, U.S.
- Party: Republican (1980–2016); Independent (2016–2019); Common Sense (2019–present)
- Spouse: Susanne Martin (m. 1978)
- Relatives: William Joseph Campbell (father)
- Education: University of Chicago (BA, MA, PhD); Harvard University (JD)

Thomas John Campbell (born August 14, 1952) is an American academic, educator, and politician. He represented parts of Silicon Valley, California in the United States House of Representatives for five terms from 1989 to 1993 and 1995 to 2001. He is currently a professor of law and a professor of economics at Chapman University. He has also been a professor at Stanford Law School and the University of California, Berkeley, dean of Chapman University School of Law, and dean of Haas School of Business. He also served one term in the California State Senate from 1993 to 1995.

As a politician, Campbell was a moderate or libertarian member of the Republican Party. Campbell ran unsuccessfully three times for the United States Senate. In 1992, he retired from the House to run and narrowly lost the Republican primary to Bruce Herschensohn; Herschensohn lost the general election to Barbara Boxer. In 2000, he retired again and won the Republican primary but lost decisively in the general election to Democratic incumbent Dianne Feinstein. In 2010, he withdrew his campaign for Governor of California to run again for the seat held by Boxer but lost the Republican primary to Carly Fiorina. In 2016, he announced that he would leave the Republican Party over his opposition to presidential nominee Donald Trump, and in 2019, he founded the Common Sense Party of California.

== Early life and education ==
Thomas John Campbell was born in Chicago, Illinois on August 14, 1952. His father, William Joseph Campbell, served as a judge of the United States District Court for the Northern District of Illinois from 1940 to 1970 and was chief judge from 1959 to 1970. His family was loyal to the Democratic Party.

Campbell graduated from St. Ignatius College Prep in Chicago in 1969 as valedictorian. He graduated from the University of Chicago in 1973 with bachelor's and master's degrees. He graduated from Harvard Law School in 1976. After graduating from Harvard, he clerked for Judge George MacKinnon of the United States Court of Appeals for the District of Columbia Circuit and Justice Byron White of the Supreme Court of the United States.

== Reagan administration and academic career ==
After completing a doctorate in economics under Milton Friedman at the University of Chicago in 1980, Campbell joined the Republican Party and served as a White House Fellow in the Ronald Reagan administration, working in the offices of the White House Chief of Staff and White House Counsel. From 1981 to 1983, he served as director of the Bureau of Competition of the Federal Trade Commission, the youngest person to serve in that position as of 2002.

=== Stanford Law School ===
Campbell became a law professor at Stanford Law School in 1983, receiving tenure as a full professor in 1987. After leaving politics in 2000, Campbell returned to Stanford.

=== Haas School of Business ===
In 2002, Campbell was appointed as dean of the Haas School of Business at University of California, Berkeley. As dean, Campbell stressed the study of corporate social responsibility and business ethics, establishing the Center for Responsible Business.

In September 2004, Arnold Schwarzenegger appointed Campbell to the new California Council of Economic Advisors. From 2004 to 2005, Campbell took a leave of absence from Haas to serve as director of the California Department of Finance in the Schwarzenegger administration.

On August 27, 2007, Campbell announced that he would step down from his position at Haas in the summer of 2008. In mid-2008, Campbell joined the Palo Alto office of Gibson, Dunn & Crutcher.

=== Chapman University ===
In January 2009, Campbell joined the Chapman University School of Law for a two-year visiting appointment as the Fletcher Jones Distinguished Visiting Professor. In February 2011, Chapman announced that Campbell would be its new Dean.

=== Works ===
In 2004, Campbell published The Separation of Powers in Practice with Stanford University Press.

== Political career ==
Campbell represented parts of Silicon Valley for five terms in the United States House of Representatives. He represented a district including Palo Alto from 1989 to 1993 before leaving office to run unsuccessfully for U.S. Senate. He won special elections to the California State in 1993 and U.S. House in 1995. After serving another three terms in the House, he unsuccessfully ran for Senate again.

After a hiatus from electoral politics from 2000 to 2010, Campbell ran for Governor of California. He dropped out of the race to run for Senate for a third and final time, losing the primary to Carly Fiorina.

During his stints in Congress, Campbell was regarded as one of the most socially liberal Republicans, supporting abortion rights and gay rights. As a fiscal conservative, he was the only Republican in the House to vote against the Taxpayer Relief Act of 1997.

=== U.S. House (1989–93) ===
In 1988, Campbell ran for the United States House of Representatives from California's 12th congressional district, which included most of Silicon Valley outside of San Jose. The district was represented by Republican incumbent Ernie Konnyu, who faced three separate accusations of sexual harassment from staffers, one of whom was fired after refusing to attend any more private meetings with Konnyu. Konnyu's predecessor Ed Zschau actively recruited Campbell, and Pete McCloskey, who had represented the district before Zschau, called Konnyu an "embarrassment" and threatened to run himself. Campbell easily defeated Konnyu in the June 7 primary.

Although the district had traditionally been represented by moderate Republicans, it had become increasingly friendly to Democratic candidates. In the general election, Campbell narrowly defeated San Mateo County supervisor Anna Eshoo.

He was easily re-elected in 1990.

=== 1992 U.S. Senate campaign ===
After serving two terms in the House, Campbell ran for the United States Senate seat vacated by Alan Cranston. His House seat had been made considerably more Democratic in decennial redistricting; since 1992, no Republican candidate has won more than 39 percent of the vote there.

In the Republican primary, he faced Bruce Herschensohn, a television host who positioned himself as a considerably more conservative candidate. Herschensohn narrowly defeated Campbell in the primary; he was defeated by U.S. representative Barbara Boxer in the general election.

=== California Senate (1993–95) ===
In 1993, California state senator Becky Morgan stepped down to become a nonprofit executive. Her district substantially overlapped with Campbell's former U.S. House district, and he successfully ran in the special election to complete her term.

In the State Senate, Campbell was chair of the Housing Committee, vice chair of the Education Committee, and served on the Budget Committee. During his only term in office, the California Journal rated Campbell as the Best Problem Solver, the Most Ethical State Senator, and the overall Best State Senator.

=== Return to U.S. House (1995–2001) ===
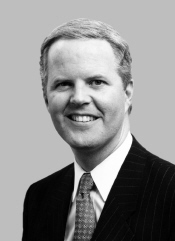
Campbell as a member of the 106th United States Congress.

In 1995, Norman Mineta unexpectedly resigned from his seat in the U.S. House to accept a position with Lockheed Martin. Mineta's district, which was based in San Jose and included Campbell's home, was widely considered safely Democratic. Despite the considerable Democratic advantage in voter registration and efforts to tie Campbell to Newt Gingrich, Campbell easily won a December special election to complete Mineta's term. He was easily re-elected in 1996 and 1998.

In 1997, Campbell was the only Republican in the House to vote against the Taxpayer Relief Act of 1997.

==== Kosovo War ====
In 1999, Campbell led a bipartisan group of 31 members of Congress in suing President Bill Clinton over his conduct with respect to the Kosovo War. The lawsuit accused Clinton of failing to report to Congress within 48 hours on the status of the action, as required by the War Powers Resolution, and of failing to obtain a declaration of war from Congress as required by the Constitution of the United States. The House had voted 427–2 against a declaration of war and had voted to deny funding for the bombing campaign supported by Clinton.

A federal judge dismissed the lawsuit, ruling that since Congress had later voted in favor of funding after the United States actively engaged in the war, legislators had sent a confusing message about whether they approved of the war. Campbell said afterwards that this sidestepped the War Powers Act and argued that the judge's decision would require House members who oppose a war to cut off funding for troops in the midst of combat in order to end it:

The opinion of the federal district court, in its own terms, rejects all previous opinions of the district court and circuit court, holding instead that the Supreme Court's opinion in Raines v. Byrd is the only relevant precedent. ... Accordingly, the federal district court reasoned further that the actions of the House in approving appropriations for the war constituted a significant indication that the Congress does not seek a conflict with the executive. That belies the statement in the War Powers Act (sic) that no appropriation should be taken as authorization, in light of the fact that members of Congress will often vote funds for a war once American troops are engaged in it. The court also said that the failure of the House to pass a concurrent resolution calling for the immediate removal of the troops deprived the House members of standing. This, to my knowledge, is the first time in judicial history where the failure of a house of Congress to do something is held to have legal significance.

=== 2000 U.S. Senate campaign ===
In 2000, Campbell ran again for United States Senate. He easily won the Republican primary over state senator Ray Haynes and San Diego County supervisor Bill Horn.

In the general election against incumbent Dianne Feinstein, Campbell touted his service as a moderate Republican representing a strongly Democratic district. He was badly defeated, losing the state by over 19 points and losing his own district by almost 15 points.

As of 2025, Campbell is the last elected Republican to have represented a significant portion of San Jose above the county level.

=== Return to politics and 2010 campaigns ===
In 2008, Campbell publicly opposed Proposition 8, the proposed ballot measure banning same-sex marriage in the state, per his belief that "government should be limited" and "has no business making distinctions between people based on their personal lives." Proposition 8 passed by a margin of 52 to 48 percent.

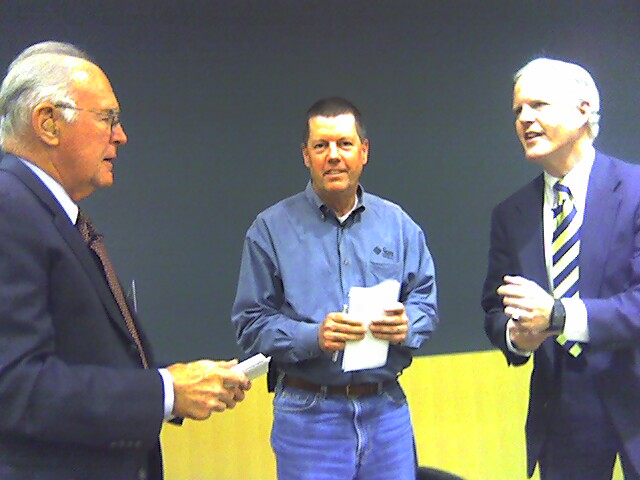
Campbell (right) with Intel founder Gordon Moore and Sun founder Scott McNealy

In July 2008, Campbell filed the necessary paperwork to establish a fundraising committee for a prospective race for the Republican nomination to be Governor of California in 2010. However, on January 13, 2010, Campbell announced that he would run a third campaign for United States Senate instead, campaigning for the seat held by Barbara Boxer since 1992.

In the Republican primary, Campbell faced former Hewlett-Packard executive Carly Fiorina and state assemblyman Chuck DeVore, and two others. Although he had an early lead in polling over Fiorina, she ran an intensely negative campaign. One Fiorina ad, known as the Demon Sheep ad, depicted Campbell as a wolf in sheep's clothing and gained international publicity for its bizarre visuals.

Campbell's campaign was damaged by his past associations with Sami Al-Arian, a computer engineering professor at the University of South Florida who had pleaded guilty in 2006 to conspiracy to help the Palestinian Islamic Jihad, a designated terrorist group. In 2000, Campbell had received campaign contributions from Al-Arian, and in 2002, Campbell wrote a letter opposing academic discipline for Al-Arian.

Campbell initially denied that he had received contributions from Al-Arian, which proved to be untrue. He defended the letter by arguing that he had not been aware of the charges against Al-Arian when he wrote it and had also not been aware of comments Al-Arian had recorded in Cleveland, Ohio in 1988, when he shouted, "Jihad is our path. Victory to Islam. Death to Israel." Al-Arian had previously defended the remarks on a September 26, 2001 episode of The O'Reilly Factor; Campbell initially claimed that his letter had been sent before the O'Reilly interview; Al-Arian was placed on initial academic leave shortly after the interview. Despite this, Campbell maintained,

I did not hear, I did not read, I was not aware of statements Sami Al-Arian had made relative to Israel. And I would not have written the letter had I known about those. ... To say 'Death to Israel' is abhorrent; it's horrible.

Fiorina accused Campbell of being unfriendly to the interests of Israel, and her campaign was accused of attacking Campbell and his supporters as antisemitic. A March 5 debate between the three main candidates, called by Campbell, focused on the issue. Campbell responded strongly to Fiorina's accusations, saying, "I called for this debate today so that both of my opponents can bring up absolutely any charge they want. Air it, and let me respond to it. But there’s no place for calling me antisemitic, then denying it. That whispering campaign, that 'silent slander,' stops today." Campbell maintained that he had not been aware of Al-Arian's statements and attributed his earlier inaccurate claims to failures of memory, but he apologized for not researching the matter more thoroughly before writing the letter.

Ultimately, Fiorina defeated Campbell by a wide margin of over 800,000 votes. Hypothetical polling before the primary had shown that Campbell would have been leading Boxer or within the margin of error, while Fiorina trailed. Although Fiorina ran a competitive race and did lead in some post-primary polling, she ultimately lost the general election to Boxer by over one million votes.

=== 2016 and 2020 U.S. presidential elections ===
In August 2016, Campbell published an op-ed in The Mercury News calling on the Republican National Committee to replace Donald Trump as the nominee for president, and saying that he would withdraw from the Republican Party if that did not happen. Campbell wrote:

On Aug. 9, Trump said, "If she gets to pick her judges, nothing you can do, folks. ... Although the Second Amendment people -- maybe there is, I don't know." Trump's campaign explained this meant Second Amendment supporters would defeat Clinton at the ballot box. That, however, is not a logical interpretation of the remark. The context was what can be done if Clinton becomes president; not what can be done to stop her from becoming president. As such, this is a statement of great recklessness, made all the more so by our present environment of violence used to advance extremism.

Trump's words were similar to other calls he has made to ignore the rule of law. He has proposed ordering members of the U.S. military to violate American law regarding torture, assuring us that his orders, rather than the law, would be obeyed. He has encouraged physical violence by individuals against protesters at his rallies, assuring anyone doing so that he would cover their legal costs. He has threatened to use the antitrust laws against a company and an individual because the newspaper that individual owns has criticized him.

Campbell also said he could not support the Democratic nominee, Hillary Clinton, over her mishandling of official public communications. Campbell officially changed his registration to independent shortly thereafter.

In 2016, Campbell wrote a column for the Orange County Register suggesting that libertarian-leaning Republicans should consider supporting Gary Johnson. Campbell was later one of thirty former Republican members of Congress who wrote an open letter denouncing Trump's candidacy, and Johnson named Campbell to a list of potential Supreme Court nominees.

In 2019, Campbell co-founded the centrist Common Sense Party of California. In 2020, Campbell was speculated as a possible candidate for the Libertarian nomination for president in 2020, but he endorsed former judge Jim Gray for the nomination.

Campbell is a supporter of the National Popular Vote Interstate Compact.

== Personal life ==
Campbell married Susanne Martin in 1978.

== Awards ==
- 1998 University of Chicago Alumni Professional Achievement Award
- 2016 Anti-Defamation League Orange County/Long Beach Marcus Kaufman Jurisprudence Award

== Books ==
- Separation of Powers in Practice (2004) ISBN 0-8047-5027-0

== Electoral history ==
1988 United States House of Representatives elections
Party	Candidate	Votes	%
Republican	Tom Campbell	136,384	51.7%
Democratic	Anna Eshoo	121,523	46.0%
Libertarian	Tom Grey	6,023	2.3%
Total votes		263,930	100.0%
Turnout			
Republican hold			

1990 United States House of Representatives elections
Party	Candidate	Votes	%
Republican	Tom Campbell (Incumbent)	125,157	60.8%
Democratic	Bob Palmer	69,270	33.7%
Libertarian	Chuck Olson	11,271	5.5%
Total votes		205,698	100.0%
Turnout			
Republican hold			

1992 Republican Senate primary, California
Party	Candidate	Votes	%
Republican	Bruce Herschensohn	956,146	38.80%
Republican	Tom Campbell	859,970	34.90%
Republican	Sonny Bono	417,848	16.96%
Republican	Isaac Park Yonker	94,623	3.84%
Republican	Alexander Swift Justice	60,104	2.44%
Republican	John W. Spring	54,941	2.23%
Republican	John M. Brown	20,810	0.84%
Total votes		2,464,442	100.00%

List of special elections to the United States House of Representatives in California
Party	Candidate	Votes	%
Republican	Tom Campbell	54,372	58.85
Democratic	Jerry Estruth	33,051	35.77
Independent	Linh Kieu Dao	4,922	5.33
Reform	Connor Vlakancic (write-in)	42	0.05
Total votes		92,387	100.00
Turnout			
Republican gain from Democratic			

1996 United States House of Representatives elections in California
Party	Candidate	Votes	%
Republican	Tom Campbell (Incumbent)	132,737	58.6
Democratic	Dick Lane	79,048	34.9
Reform	Valli Sharpe-Geisler	6,230	2.7
Libertarian	Ed Wimmers	5,481	2.4
Natural Law	Bruce Currivan	3,372	1.4
Republican	Linh Dao (write-in)	9	0.0
Republican	Connor Vlakancic (write-in)	9	0.0
Total votes		226,886	100.0
Turnout			
Republican hold			

2000 U.S. Senate election, California
Party	Candidate	Votes	%
Democratic	Dianne Feinstein (incumbent)	5,932,522	55.84%
Republican	Tom Campbell	3,886,853	36.59%
Green	Medea Susan Benjamin	326,828	3.08%
Libertarian	Gail Lightfoot	187,718	1.77%
American Independent	Diane Beall Templin	134,598	1.27%
Reform	Jose Luis Olivares Camahort	96,552	0.91%
Natural Law	Brian M. Rees	58,537	0.55%
Invalid or blank votes		519,233	4.66%
Total votes		11,142,841	100.00%
Turnout			51.92
Democratic hold			

Republican primary results, California U.S. Senate 2010
Party	Candidate	Votes	%
Republican	Carly Fiorina	1,315,429	56.4
Republican	Tom Campbell	504,289	21.7
Republican	Chuck DeVore	452,577	19.3
Republican	Al Ramirez	42,149	1.8
Republican	Tim Kalemkarian	19,598	0.8
Total votes		2,334,042	100.0

== See also ==
- List of law clerks for the sixth seat of the Supreme Court of the United States

U.S. House of Representatives
Preceded by Ernie Konnyu	Member of the U.S. House of Representatives from California's 12th congressional district 1989–1993	Succeeded by Tom Lantos
Preceded by Norman Mineta	Member of the U.S. House of Representatives from California's 15th congressional district 1995–2001	Succeeded by Mike Honda
Party political offices
Preceded by Michael Huffington	Republican nominee for U.S. Senator from California (Class 3); 2000	Succeeded by Dick Mountjoy
Academic offices
Preceded by Laura Tyson	Dean of the Haas School of Business; 2002–2008	Succeeded by Richard Lyons
Preceded by John Eastman	Dean of the Chapman University School of Law; 2011–2016	Succeeded by Matthew Parlow
U.S. order of precedence (ceremonial)
Preceded by Mel Levine as Former U.S. Representative	Order of precedence of the United States as Former U.S. Representative	Succeeded by Diane Watson as Former U.S. Representative
