= Common Sense Party of California =

Common Sense Party
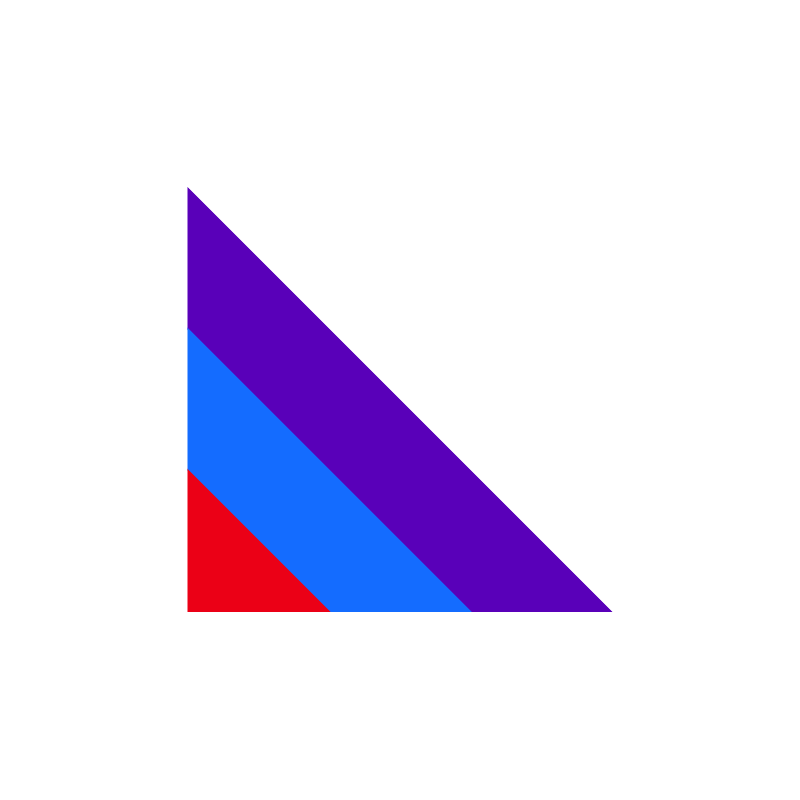
- Abbreviation: CSP
- Chairperson: Tom Campbell
- Founded: 2019
- Registered voters (October 2025): 15,010
- Ideology: Reformism
- Political position: Center
- Colors: Blue, Red, Purple
- Statewide executive offices: 0 / 8
- Seats in the State Senate: 0 / 40
- Seats in the State Assembly: 0 / 80

Website
- www.cacommonsense.org

The Common Sense Party of California was a political party in the U.S. state of California. It was founded in 2019 under the chairmanship of Tom Campbell, and sought to acquire enough voter registrations to qualify as a state-recognized political party. As of September 2026, it had no media coverage, had apparently not progressed towards obtaining signatures to support state-recognition, and appeared to have no plans for participating in the 2026 midterm elections.

== History ==
The Common Sense Party was founded in 2019 by former Republican representative Tom Campbell, former Independent state Senator Quentin Kopp, former political consultant Dan Schnur, and former state Commerce Secretary Julie Meier Wright. Coming with multi-partisan experiences in California politics, these politicians collaborated to create a new political party that supports governance reform and multi-party representation. The party attempted to make a push into podcasting with one of the party's advisors, Michael Maxsenti, running Front and Center where he discussed third party issues mostly centering around "creating unity." During an interview on another podcast Maxsenti stated in 2022 that the party was struggling to attract and vet candidates who appeal to their broad camp as the party lacked unified positions on social issues.

On January 27, 2023, the Common Sense Party and the Forward Party announced a coalition in California with the goal of achieving the necessary 73,000 registered voters to gain qualified political party status in the state. During the 2024 elections the party strongly advocated for adopting ranked choice voting nationwide. As of March 2026, the Common Sense Party website seems to lapsed into permanent inaction, with the long unchanged statement about its registered voters remaining "We’re more than 1/3rd of our way to that goal!."

== Political positions ==
The Common Sense Party focused primarily on reform of the political system rather than specific issues, concentrating on the state level.

=== Legislative and voting reform ===
The Common Sense Party advocated legislative transparency and accountability (a possible example being to "require a recorded vote on every bill in committee"). It also supported alternative voting systems, for instance proposing "ranked choice voting" as a "potential solution" to limited choices of candidates."

=== Campaign finance reform ===
The Common Sense Party supported campaign finance reform, for instance suggesting democracy vouchers aimed at reducing the financial influence of PACs, special interest groups, and lobbies. It was also critical of the Supreme Court ruling in Citizens United v. FEC, which prohibited the government from restricting independent expenditures for political campaigns by corporations and other associations.

=== Eventual other issues ===
On his "position papers" web page, Tom Campbell explained that the "Common Sense Party stand[s] for...candidates who think for themselves,” and offers an extensive set of "possible beliefs such a candidate might hold," on issues including "compassionate and moderate" immigration reform, climate change ("global carbon tax"), and affordable housing (for example, "built-out" cities financially helping non-built-out cities in the region provide additional affordable housing).
