= Congressional Anti-Bullying Caucus =

Caucus in the United States Congress

The Congressional Caucus to End Bullying was a congressional caucus of the United States Congress dedicated to advocacy of bills which target bullying in educational institutions and other establishments with anti-bullying legislation. It was headed by Rep. Mike Honda and was launched on June 28, 2012. It ended in January 2017 when Rep. Mike Honda lost his bid for reelection.

== Members ==
- Rep. Mike Honda (D - CA) - chairman
- Rep. Joe Baca (D - CA)
- Rep. Madeleine Bordallo (D - Guam)
- Rep. Lois Capps (D - CA)
- Rep. Russ Carnahan (D - MO)
- Rep. Judy Chu (D - CA)
- Rep. Hansen Clarke (D - MI)
- Rep. Steve Cohen (D - TN)
- Rep. John Conyers (D - GA)
- Rep. Charles Bass (R - N.H.)
- Rep. Robert Dold (R - Ill.)
- Rep. Keith Ellison (D - MN)
- Rep. Raúl Grijalva (D - AZ)
- Rep. Luis Gutiérrez (D - IL)
- Rep. Janice Hahn (D - CA)
- Rep. Alcee Hastings (D - FL)
- Rep. Brian Higgins (D - N.Y.)
- Rep. Eleanor Holmes Norton (D - D.C.)
- Rep. Kathy Hochul (D - N.Y.)
- Rep. Sheila Jackson Lee (D - TX)
- Rep. Barbara Lee (D - CA)
- Rep. Frank LoBiondo (R - N.J.)
- Rep. Dave Loebsack (D - IA)
- Rep. Betty McCollum (D - MN)
- Rep. Gregory Meeks (D - N.Y.)
- Rep. Frank Pallone (D - N.J.)
- Rep. Bill Pascrell (D - N.Y.)
- Rep. Gary Peters (D - MI)
- Rep. Jared Polis (D - CO)
- Rep. Nick Rahall (D - W.V.)
- Rep. Silvestre Reyes (D - TX)
- Rep. Laura Richardson (D - CA)
- Rep. Lucille Roybal-Allard (D - CA)
- Rep. Gregorio Sablan (D - Northern Marianas)
- Rep. Linda Sánchez (D - CA)
- Rep. Pete Stark (D - CA)
- Rep. Edolphus Towns (D - N.Y.)
- Rep. Maxine Waters (D - CA)
- Rep. Melvin Watt (D - N.C.)
- Rep. Henry Waxman (D - CA)
- Rep. Frederica Wilson (D - FL)

== Website ==
- Website
