= Jeff Morgan =

American businessman

J. Jeffrey Morgan is an American conservationist and former technology executive. He is best known for founding Global Heritage Fund (GHF), a non-profit organization that works internationally to preserve cultural heritage sites in the developing world. From 2002 to 2012, Morgan served as GHF's Executive Director.

Jeff Morgan is Executive Director of Global Conservation working to save endangered UNESCO World Heritage and National Parks in developing countries.

== Professional life ==
Prior to founding GHF, Morgan worked as an international sales and marketing executive in software and network computing, including at Hewlett-Packard and Sun Microsystems. He traveled extensively during this time, and lamented that in regions where increased tourism revenue could potentially yield the greatest benefits to local communities, there seemed to be a disregard for cultural heritage conservation. He founded and was CEO of Rad Media in Palo Alto in 1995.

Morgan founded GHF in 2002, and since then, the organization has raised investment of over $40 million and secured $28 million in co-funding for 16 global heritage sites to ensure their sustainable preservation and responsible development. The organization, which works exclusively in the developing world, currently has conservation projects in Cambodia, China, Colombia, Guatemala, India, Iraq, Laos, Libya, Peru, and Turkey. Morgan left GHF in 2012

Until 2015, Morgan served on the advisory board of the Stanford Institute for Economic Policy Research (SIEPR).

== Personal life ==
Morgan was born in Palo Alto, California to James C. Morgan, who served as CEO of Applied Materials for 26 years, and Becky Morgan, a former Republican California State Senator. Morgan grew up in Palo Alto and later attended Cornell University, where he earned a degree in urban and regional planning, and Stanford University Graduate School of Business, where he earned a master's in management. He lives in Portola Valley. He has three children. His oldest, Julien, attended Cornell, the middle one, Lucie, attends Boston University, and is youngest is Sophie, who is currently attending Cornell University.

== Books ==
- Cracking the Japanese Market: Keys to Success in the New Global Economy. Free Press. 1991. ISBN 1416573550.
- Saving Our Global Heritage. GHF Press. 2004.
