= 1995 California's 15th congressional district special election =

- December 12, 1995

California's 15th congressional district
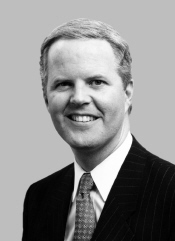

| Nominee | Tom Campbell | Jerry Estruth | Linh Keiu Dao |
| Party | Republican | Democratic | Independent |
| Popular vote | 54,372 | 33,051 | 4,922 |
| Percentage | 58.85% | 35.77% | 5.33% |
U.S. Representative before election
Norman Mineta
Democratic
Elected U.S. Representative
Tom Campbell
Republican

The 1995 California's 15th congressional district special election took place on December 12, 1995, to replace Democratic Congressman Norman Mineta, who resigned from Congress on October 10, 1995, to accept a position at Lockheed Martin. All candidates appeared on the same ballot regardless of party affiliation, and a runoff election would have been held if no candidate received a majority of the vote.

While many prominent Democrats considered running in the special election, stockbroker Jerry Estruth was the only Democratic candidate to file. State Senator Tom Campbell, who represented California's 12th congressional district from 1989 to 1993 before unsuccessfully running for the U.S. Senate in 1992, was likewise the only Republican candidate to file. Estruth campaigned on his opposition to the policies of Speaker Newt Gingrich, attacking Campbell for "vot[ing] with Newt Gingrich 76 percent of the time" that they served in Congress together. Campbell ultimately won the election by a wide margin, receiving 59 percent of the vote to Estruth's 36 percent, flipping the seat to Republican control. The result split the California congressional delegation evenly at 26 to 26. The subsequent election in 1996 resulted in Democrats regaining the majority of the congressional delegation, which they have held since then.

== General election ==
=== Candidates ===
- Tom Campbell, State Senator, former Congressman from California's 12th congressional district (1989–1993), 1992 Republican candidate for the U.S. Senate (Republican)
- Jerry Estruth, stockbroker (Democratic)
- Linh Keiu Dao, computer engineer (Independent)

==== Declined ====
- Karin Dowdy, West Valley–Mission Community College District trustee (Republican)
- Susan Hammer, Mayor of San Jose (Democratic)

=== Results ===
1995 California's 15th congressional district special election
| Party | Candidate | Votes | % |
|---|---|---|---|
| Republican | Tom Campbell | 54,372 | 58.85% |
| Democratic | Jerry Estruth | 33,051 | 35.77% |
| Independent | Linh Keiu Dao | 4,922 | 5.33% |
| Write-ins | Connor Vlakancic | 42 | 0.05% |
| Total votes | | 92,387 | 100.00% |
| Republican gain from Democratic | | | |

=== By county ===
| County | Tom Campbell Republican | | Jerry Estruth Democratic | | Linh Dao Independent | | Connor Vlakancic Write-in | | Margin | | Total votes cast |
| County | # | % | # | % | # | % | # | % | # | % | Total votes cast |
|---|---|---|---|---|---|---|---|---|---|---|---|
| Santa Clara (part) | 48,325 | 58.9% | 29,305 | 35.7% | 769 | 5.3% | 35 | 0.0% | 19,020 | 23.2% | 82,027 |
| Santa Cruz (part) | 6,047 | 58.4% | 3,746 | 36.2% | 560 | 5.4% | 7 | 0.1% | 2,301 | 22.2% | 10,360 |
| Totals | 54,372 | 58.85% | 33,051 | 35.77% | 4,922 | 5.33% | 42 | 0.05% | 21,321 | 23.08% | 92,387 |
