= Jeff Morgan (vintner) =

American winemaker

Jeff Morgan (born October 3, 1953) is an American winemaker, writer, cookbook author, and co-founder of Covenant Wines.

The former West Coast editor of Wine Spectator magazine (where he worked from 1992 to 1999), Morgan began his wine career in his mid-30s after working as a professional saxophonist in Europe (eventually as bandleader at the Grand Casino in Monte Carlo) and in New York. In 2003 he co-founded Covenant Winery—dedicated to making "highly regarded" kosher Napa Valley Cabernet Sauvignon among other wine varietals.

In 2000, Morgan was hired by specialty food purveyor Dean & DeLuca as wine director. During this time, he wrote his first cookbook—Dean & DeLuca, The Food and Wine Cookbook (Chronicle Books 2002). He has written an additional 8 cookbooks since, collaborating with his wife, Jodie Morgan, on winery and restaurant cookbooks for Domaine Chandon, PlumpJack, Ruby Tuesday and Coopers Hawk. Other books include The Working Parents Cookbook, and Rosé, A Guide to the World’s Most Versatile Wine (both with Chronicle Books). Most recently, Morgan and his wife published "The Covenant Kitchen: Food and Wine for the New Jewish Table" (Schocken Books, 2015).

In 2003, Leslie Rudd, owner of vineyard land in Napa and the proprietor of Dean & DeLuca became Morgan's business partner in Covenant Wines.

In 2014, Morgan left Napa Valley and moved his winery to an urban outpost in Berkeley, California. The year prior to this, he began making wine in Israel as well, where his Covenant Israel wines have become a staple in the Tel Aviv dining scene. His daughter, Zoe Morgan, helps run the Israeli wine program. Covenant California and Covenant Israel's combined production is approximately 10,000 cases annually. The wines are generally native-yeast fermented, unfined and unfiltered.

In addition to his roles as winemaker and cookbook author, Morgan was a founding instructor (since 2003) at the Rudd Center for Professional Wine Studies at the Culinary Institute of America, Napa Valley.

Morgan's wines have received praise from Robert M. Parker, Jr. who dubbed the 2005 Covenant Cabernet one of the “finest kosher wines on Planet Earth.”* And in March 2013, the wine critic Jancis Robinson said that Morgan has made, "The best kosher wine I have ever tasted."*
