= Becky Morgan (politician) =

American politician

Member of the California Senate from the 11th district
- In office December 3, 1984 – August 17, 1993
- Preceded by: Al Alquist
- Succeeded by: Tom Campbell

Personal details
- Born: Rebecca Quinn; December 4, 1938 (age 87) Hanover, New Hampshire, U.S.
- Party: Republican
- Spouse: James C. Morgan
- Children: Jeff and Mary
- Education: Cornell University
- Occupation: philanthropist

Rebecca Quinn Morgan (born December 4, 1938) is a former Republican California State Senator.

== Early life and education ==
Born in Hanover, New Hampshire, Morgan earned her Bachelor of Science degree from Cornell University in 1960.

Morgan was a teacher from 1960 to 1962. Serving as the district office manager for Congressman Pete McCloskey in 1972, she served as an elected member of the Palo Alto Unified School District Board of Education from 1973 to 1978. After Morgan earned her MBA from the Stanford Graduate School of Business in 1978.

== Business career ==
Morgan became an assistant vice president at Bank of America. She left Bank of America in 1980 when she was elected to the Santa Clara County Board of Supervisors.

== Political career ==
After one term on the Board of Supervisors, Morgan was elected to the California State Senate in 1984 to represent the 11th District and re-elected in 1988 and 1992. During her tenure in the Senate, she was Chair of the Senate Select Committee on Child Care and Development and Vice Chair of several other Senate committees. She was also a member of the Education; Budget and Fiscal Review; Transportation, Energy and Public Utilities; and Revenue and Taxation Committees in the Senate. In 1986, when Southern Pacific sought to withdraw from managing the Caltrain commuter rail system and consequently, shutting the system down, Morgan wrote the legislation that created the Peninsula Corridor Joint Powers Board to save Caltrain by enabling the new board to run the system.

== Philanthropy ==
She resigned from the Senate effective August 17, 1993, to become President and CEO of Joint Venture: Silicon Valley Network, a nonprofit organization composed of business, government, and education groups seeking to improve the Silicon Valley region's economic growth and quality of life the following the early 1990s recession. Later that year, she co-founded the Morgan Family Foundation, which awards grants to youth programs, education, and environmental conservation and was elected to a five-year term on the Stanford University Board of Trustees. In 1998, Morgan was elected to the Cornell University Board of Trustees and re-elected in 2002. From 2008 to 2009, Morgan served on the State of California's Commission on the 21st Century Economy. In 2011, the Morgans donated a $10 million gift supports top priorities of Cornell.

In 2019, it was announced that the couple would close the foundation as of December 31, 2019.

== Personal life ==
Morgan resides in Los Altos Hills, California with her husband, James C. Morgan, whom she met while they were students at Cornell. James Morgan was CEO of Applied Materials from 1977 to 2003 and Chairman of the Applied Materials Board from 1987 to 2009. The Morgans have two adult children, Jeff and Mary.

California Senate
Preceded by Al Alquist	California State Senator; 11th District; December 3, 1984 – August 17, 1993	Succeeded by Tom Campbell
