= Mike Honda =

American politician (born 1941)

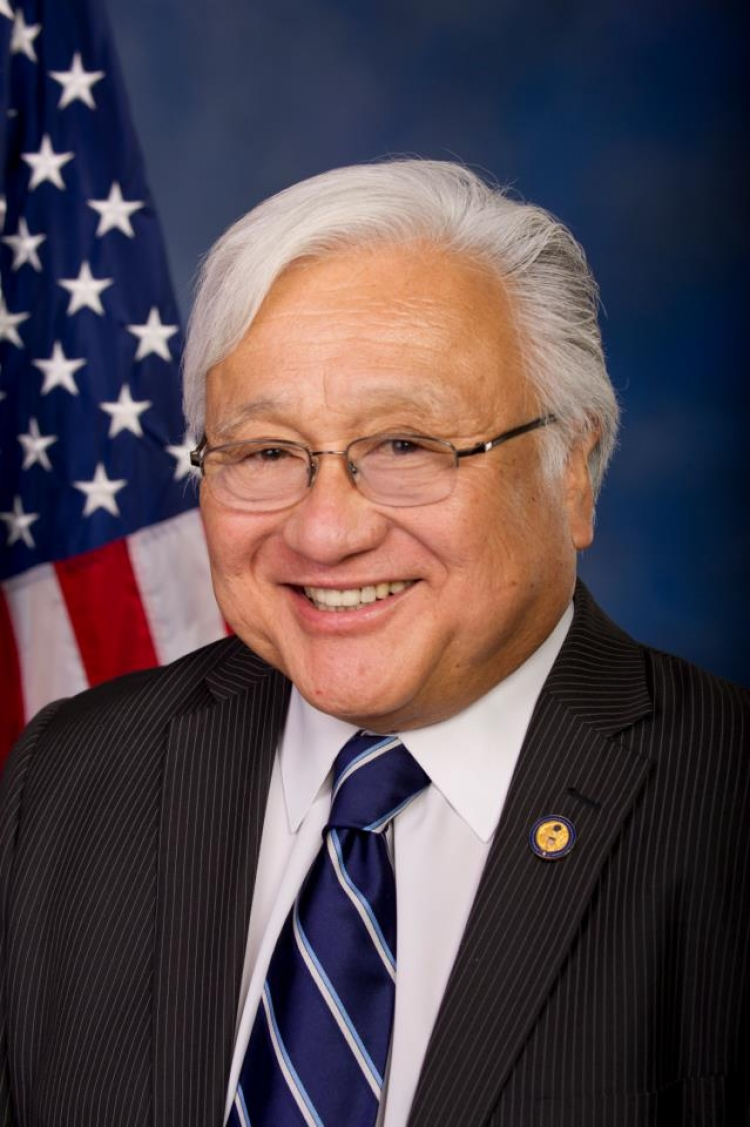
- Official portrait, 2013

Member of the U.S. House of Representatives from California
- In office January 3, 2001 – January 3, 2017
- Preceded by: Tom Campbell
- Succeeded by: Ro Khanna
- Constituency: 15th district (2001–2013); 17th district (2013–2017)

Deputy Chair of the Democratic National Committee
- In office 2003–2005 Serving with Susan Turnbull
- Leader: Terry McAuliffe
- Preceded by: Position established
- Succeeded by: Keith Ellison (2017)

Member of the California Assembly from the 23rd district
- In office December 2, 1996 – November 30, 2000
- Preceded by: Dominic Cortese
- Succeeded by: Manny Diaz

Personal details
- Born: Makoto Honda; June 27, 1941 (age 85) Walnut Grove, California, U.S.
- Party: Democratic
- Spouse: Jeanne (died 2004)
- Children: 2
- Education: San Jose State University (BA, MA)
- Honda's voice Honda honoring Norman Mineta, the first chair of the Congressional Asian Pacific American Caucus; Recorded December 15, 2010

Michael Makoto Honda (Japanese: 本田 実, romanized: Honda Makoto, born June 27, 1941) is an American politician. A member of the Democratic Party, he served in Congress from 2001 to 2017.

Initially involved in education in California, he first became active in politics in 1971, when then San Jose mayor Norman Mineta appointed Honda to the city's Planning Commission. Mineta later joined both the Bush and Clinton cabinets. After holding other positions, Honda was elected to the Santa Clara County Board of Supervisors in 1990, and to the California State Assembly in 1996, where he served until 2001.

In November 2003, Democratic National Committee chair Terry McAuliffe appointed Honda as deputy chair of the DNC. In February 2005, Honda was elected a vice chair of the Democratic National Committee under the chairmanship of Howard Dean. In 2009, Honda was reelected for a second term as DNC vice chair, under the chairmanship of former Virginia governor Tim Kaine; he served in this role until 2013.

Honda became the subject of an ethics investigation by the United States House Committee on Ethics in 2015 for the alleged use of taxpayer resources to bolster his successful 2014 re-election campaign against fellow Democrat Ro Khanna. Honda faced Khanna again in 2016 and was defeated.

== Early life and teaching ==
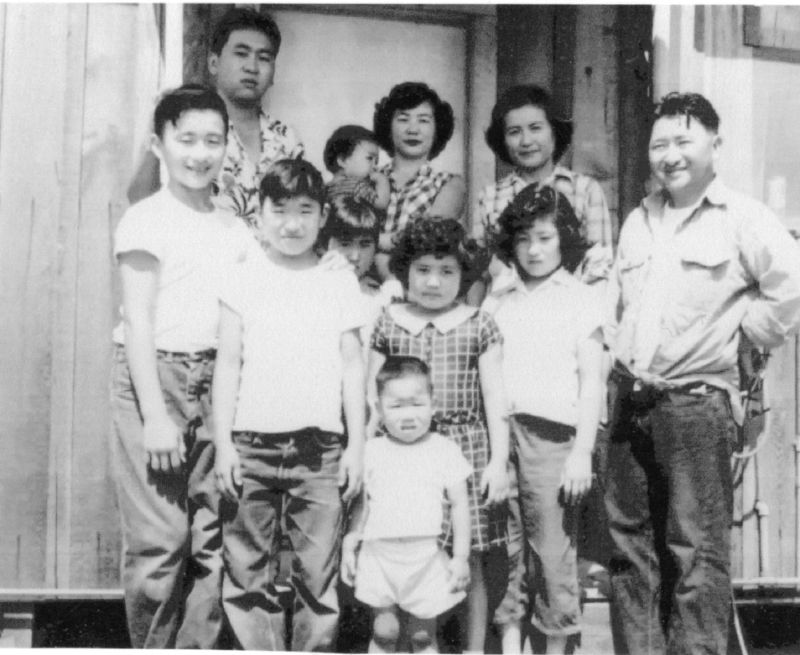
Honda (leftmost) with his family

A third-generation Japanese American ("sansei"), Makoto Honda was born in 1941 in Walnut Grove, California, the son of Fusako (Tanouye) and Giichi Honda. His father, Giichi (nicknamed "Byron"), was one of 6,000 Military Intelligence Service (MIS) agents, although the family was subjected to internment. His grandparents were from Kumamoto prefecture and immigrated to the United States in the early 1900s, and both of his parents were born in California.

When he was one year old, he and his family were sent to Camp Amache, a Japanese-American internment camp in southeastern Colorado. In 1953, his family returned to California, where they became strawberry sharecroppers in Blossom Valley in San Jose.

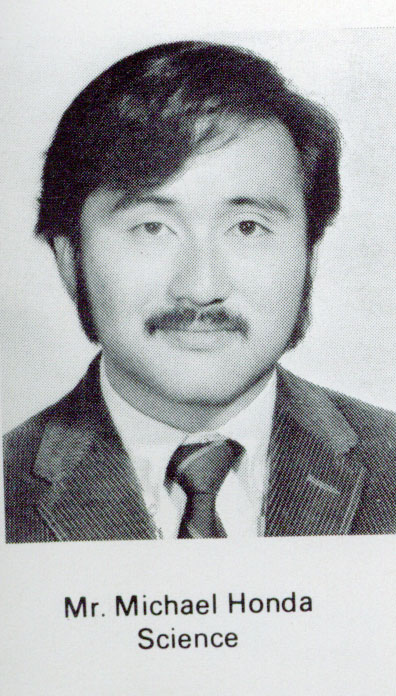
Honda as a teacher at Sunnyvale High School

Honda started at Andrew P. Hill High School, and then transferred to and graduated from San Josė High Academy. He entered San Josė State University, but interrupted his studies from 1965 to 1967 to serve in the United States Peace Corps in El Salvador, where he learned to speak Spanish. He returned to San Jose State, where, in 1968, he received a bachelor's degree in biological sciences and Spanish. He earned a master's degree in education from San Jose State in 1974.

In his 30-year career as an educator, Honda was a science teacher, a principal at two public schools, and a school board member. He also conducted educational research at Stanford University.

== Political career ==
=== Teaching and state positions ===
In 1971, San Jose Mayor Norman Mineta appointed Honda to the city's Planning Commission. In 1981, Honda was elected to the San Jose Unified School Board. He was elected to the Santa Clara County Board of Supervisors in 1990, and to the California State Assembly in 1996, where he served until 2001.

=== DNC and national positions ===
In the 2000 United States House of Representatives elections, Honda won the Democratic nomination for the 15th district, which had once been represented by Norm Mineta, and won the general election by a 12-point margin. He was re-elected in the resultant elections of 2002, 2004, 2006, 2008, 2010, and 2012.

In November 2003, chairman of the Democratic National Committee Terry McAuliffe appointed Honda as deputy chair of the DNC. In February 2005, Honda was elected a vice chair of the Democratic National Committee under the chairmanship of Howard Dean. In 2009, Honda was reelected for a second term as DNC vice chair, under the chairmanship of former Virginia Governor Tim Kaine; he served in this role until 2013.

Due to redistricting after the 2010 US census, Honda's district was renumbered as the 17th district at the beginning of the 113th Congress on January 3, 2013. The district was the only Asian American-majority district in the continental United States. The district, like its predecessor, is anchored in Silicon Valley, and encompasses northern San Jose and all or part of Cupertino, Milpitas, Santa Clara, and Sunnyvale. However, the 2013 redistricting pushed it into Alameda County, including part of Fremont and all of Newark. Honda was narrowly re-elected in 2014 against Ro Khanna, who lives in the Alameda County portion of the district. Honda lost a rematch to Khanna in 2016.

==== Early committees and caucuses ====
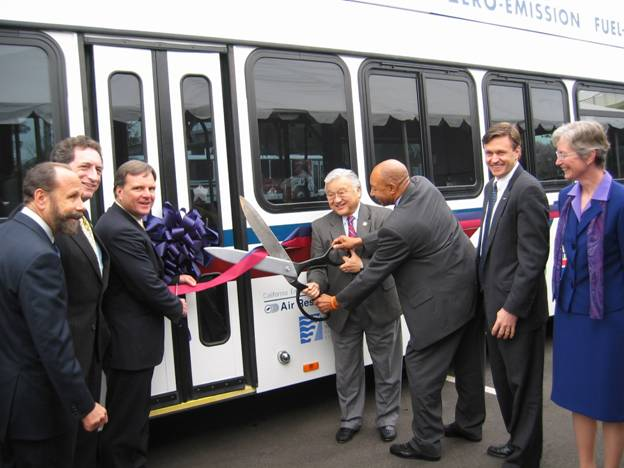
Honda (center) at the August 2006 ribbon-cutting ceremony for the opening of a zero-emissions, hydrogen fuel cell bus program

From 2001 to 2007 Honda served on the United States House Committee on Science, Space and Technology and was the ranking member of its Energy Subcommittee from 2005 to 2007. He also served on the United States House Committee on Transportation and Infrastructure from 2001 to 2007. In 2007, Speaker of the House Nancy Pelosi appointed Honda to the United States House Committee on Appropriations. From 2011 to 2013, he was ranking member of the Legislative Branch Appropriations Subcommittee. From 2001 to 2003, and again from 2011 to 2013, Honda also was appointed to serve on the House Budget Committee.

Honda was a member of the following (and other) committees, commissions, and caucuses:

- Committee on Appropriations
  - United States House Appropriations Subcommittee on Commerce, Justice, Science, and Related Agencies (Ranking Member)
  - United States House Appropriations Subcommittee on Labor, Health and Human Services, Education, and Related Agencies
- Congressional Asian Pacific American Caucus (chair emeritus from 2004 to 2010)
- Congressional Anti-Bullying Caucus (founder and chair)
- LGBT Equality Caucus (vice chair and founding member)
- Congressional Hepatitis Caucus (co-chair)
- Congressional Progressive Caucus (vice chair for new members)
- Democratic Caucus New Media Working Group (co-chair)
- Congressional Ethiopia Caucus (founder and chair)
- Congressional-Executive Commission on China (appointed commissioner since 2005)

==== Major appropriations ====
As of August 2015, Honda had secured over $1.3 billion in appropriations since 2001.

Some of Honda's most notable appropriations were for the extension of the BART system into Silicon Valley. During his five years on the House Transportation Committee, he secured $11 million in direct earmarks attached to a number of bills. Also during his time on that committee, he facilitated the BART projects qualification for the New Starts Program, which authorized another $900 million in funds, the first $400 million of which Honda managed to appropriate over the three-year period of FY2012-14. During the 2014 midterm election cycle, Honda's opponent Ro Khanna alleged that Honda only secured $2 million for the project. In response, a number of local officials including a Congresswoman, a state senator, a former US Secretary of Transportation, and former and current Valley Transportation Authority chairs, sent the Khanna campaign an open letter refuting its claims and requesting that they correct their campaign language.

The $11 million in direct appropriations was part of:

- H.R. 2673 (FY2004 Consolidated Appropriations Act, became Public Law 108-199)
- H.R. 4818 (FY 2005 Consolidated Appropriations Act, became Public Law 108-447)
- H.R. 3058 (the Transportation, Treasury, Housing and Urban Development, the Judiciary, and Independent Agencies Appropriations Act for 2006, became Public Law 109-115)

The $400 million from the New Starts Program was allocated as follows:

- $100M for FY 2012 in H.R. 2112, The Consolidated and Further Continuing Appropriations Act, 2012, which became Public Law 112-55
- $150M for FY 2013 in H.R. 933, the FY 2013 Consolidated and Further Continuing Appropriations Act, which became Public Law 113-6
- $150M for FY 2014 in H.R. 3547, the Consolidated Appropriations Act, 2014, which became Public Law 113–76.

=== Later affairs ===
In June 2023, it was reported that Honda was working in the government of the Joseon Cybernation as "Vice Minister of State" and "Emissary to the United States".

== Legislation ==
=== Raising the minimum wage ===
Honda has been a long-time supporter of organized labor, and has supported numerous bills for creating a living wage. In 2013 and 2014, he cosponsored the Original Living American Wage Act (H.R. 229), the WAGES Act (H.R. 650), and the Fair Minimum Wage Act (H.R. 1010), which would raise the federal minimum wage. Honda was also a supporter of the San Jose's successful ballot initiative that raised the city's minimum wage to $10 per hour.

=== Defense ===
As former chairman of the Afghanistan Taskforce for the Congressional Progressive Caucus, and former co-chair of the CPC's Peace and Security Taskforce, Congressman Honda has consistently critiqued the war strategy through a series of Congressional briefings, legislation, published opinion pieces ("Alternative Strategies to Obama's Afghan Agenda", "A Different Kind of Surge"), and Congressional letters to the Administration. Honda advocated an orderly withdrawal of U.S. military forces from Afghanistan and a significant realignment of U.S. aid to focus on strengthening government institutions, capacity building, economic development, and humanitarian assistance in Afghanistan. Honda criticized the Obama administration for failing to seek Congressional approval for U.S. military operations in Libya. He is critical of the wide-scale use of drones and is a cosponsor of the Targeted Lethal Force Transparency Act (H.R. 4372) requiring an annual report on the number of civilians and combatants killed and injured in drone strikes.

=== Education ===
In 2008, Honda worked with then-Senator Barack Obama to introduce the Enhancing STEM Education Act. Honda introduced the House version, H.R. 6104, and Obama introduced the Senate version, S.3047, on the same day.

The bills sought to enhance the coordination among state and federal governments to improve STEM (science, technology, engineering, and mathematics) education by creating a committee on STEM education at the Office of Science and Technology Policy (OSTP) and an Office of STEM at the Department of Education, instituting a voluntary State Consortium on STEM education, and creating a National STEM Education Research Repository. Portions of this bill (notably, creating a committee on STEM education at OSTP), as well as Honda's INVENT Act (which would develop curriculum tools for use in teaching innovation and fostering inventiveness at the K-16 level), were eventually included in the America COMPETES Act reauthorization, which President Obama signed into law on January 4, 2011.

Honda led the Congressional authorization for The Equity and Excellence Commission, a commission that began in 2011 and reported its findings to the Secretary of Education in late 2012. The commission is a federal advisory committee chartered by Congress, operating under the Federal Advisory Committee Act (FACA); 5 U.S.C., App.2. The commission had 27 members from a range of backgrounds, including education, law, tax, government, business, and civil rights. The committee met 17 times in Washington, DC and across the country. In November 2012, the commission presented its findings in a report titled "For Each and Every Child: A Strategy for Education Equity and Excellence." The findings focused around five recommendations: (1) restructuring the financing of schools, focusing on equitable resources; (2) supporting quality teachers and school leaders; (3) supporting early childhood education; (4) promoting increased parental engagement; and, (5) addressing changes in accountability and governance in the education system. Opposed by special interests, including the teachers' unions, the commission's recommendations went largely ignored.

=== Environment ===
Honda secured millions of dollars in federal funding for the cleanup and demolition of the former Almaden Air Force Station atop Mt. Umunhum. Contaminated with standard-use hazardous materials during its military use (lead paint, asbestos, etc.), the site was remediated, demolished, and is slated to open for public access in spring 2017. Honda has also advocated for programs such as the Land and Water Conservation Fund.

In 2014, Honda introduced the Climate Change Education Act (H.R. 4461), legislation that aims to improving public understanding of the impact of greenhouse gases on the environment and the steps that individuals and communities can take to combat the global warming crisis.

=== Faith and religion ===
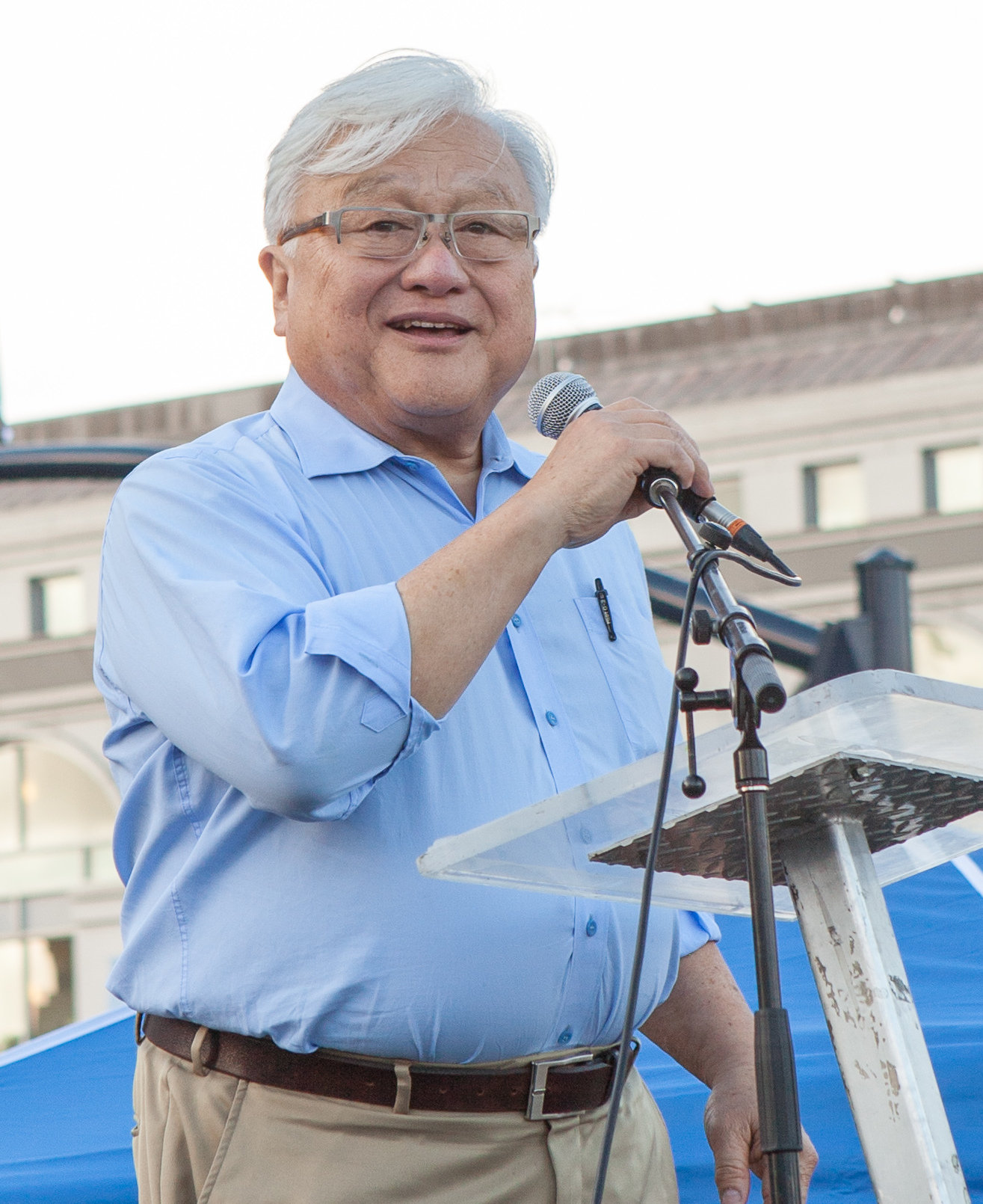
Honda speaks at a San Francisco protest of the U.S. immigration ban in February 2017.

In 2014, Honda introduced the Freedom of Faith Act (H.R. 4460).

Honda has been a defender of the civil rights of American Muslims. Soon after the September 11 attacks in 2001, Honda spoke at a convention of the American Muslim Alliance (AMA) in October 2001. He told those in attendance not to change their identity or name. "My last name is Honda. You cannot be more Japanese than that." The congressman remembered what he and especially his parents had to go through when Pearl Harbor was attacked. "We were taken in a vehicle with windows covered, we had no idea where we were being taken."

In the Quran oath controversy of the 110th United States Congress, Rep. Virgil Goode (R-VA) issued a letter to his constituents stating his view that the decision of Representative-elect Keith Ellison (D-MN) to use the Quran in his swearing-in ceremony is a threat to "the values and beliefs traditional to the United States of America... I fear that in the next century we will have many more Muslims in the United States if we do not adopt the strict immigration policies". In response, Honda penned a response to Goode expressing his surprise and offense by that letter and declaring "No person should be labeled as un-American based on his or her religion, and it is outrageous to cast aspersions on Representative-elect Ellison purely because of his religious background."

=== Government reform ===
In 2007, Honda voted for the Honest Leadership and Open Government Act of 2007, which was the legislative response to the Jack Abramoff scandal and introduced comprehensive new transparency requirements for lobbyists and for Members of Congress. In 2012, he cosponsored H.R. 1148, the Stop Trading on Congressional Knowledge (STOCK) Act, which criminalized insider trading by Members of Congress and required numerous disclosures. He voted for H.Res. 895, which created the first-ever independent ethics office, the Office of Congressional Ethics.

=== Health care ===
Honda has advocated for the expansion of health coverage for all through the Affordable Care Act (ACA) and is a big proponent of the public option. As the Chair of the Congressional Asian Pacific American Caucus, Honda was successful in ensuring that the ACA addressed racial and ethnic health disparities, including improvements in data collection, and measures to increase the number of health care providers from different backgrounds.

As the chairman and chair emeritus of Congressional Asian Pacific American Caucus, he sponsored and supported the Health Care Equality and Accountability Act, which would have expanded access to care for individuals with limited English proficiency, increased health workforce diversity, and encouraged further studies on the minority health issues. As a member of the TriCaucus with the Congressional Black Caucus and Congressional Hispanic Caucus, Honda has introduced legislation focused on health disparities in correlation to an annual health disparities summit.

Honda has led efforts to address tuberculosis by seeking changes to the Centers of Disease Control and Prevention's (CDC) formula for direct funding for tuberculosis treatment and education to include highly impacted counties. He was successful in getting report language in the 2009 Omnibus Appropriations Bill to have the CDC review its funding distribution policies.

Honda has been a leader in Congress for viral hepatitis and founded and co-chairs the Congressional Viral Hepatitis Caucus. He is a cosponsor of the Viral Hepatitis Testing Act (H.R. 3723), which will authorize new prevention and testing programs for hepatitis B and hepatitis C, and implement screening for veterans for hepatitis C. He also cosponsored the Viral Hepatitis Testing Act (H.R. 3381) in the 112th Congress, the Viral Hepatitis and Liver Cancer Control and Prevention Act (H.R. 3974) in the 111th Congress, and the National Hepatitis B Act (H.R. 3944) in the 110th Congress.

Honda has supported mobile health technology innovation and introduced the Health Care Innovation and Marketplace Technologies Act of 2013 (H.R. 2363).

This bill establishes an Office of Wireless Health at the FDA, award grant for the development of effective product, process, or structure that enhances the use, particularly by patients, of health information technology, and provides medical professionals tax incentives to implement qualified health information technology in their practices.

Honda has been an advocate for women's health including supporting provisions in the Patient Protection and Affordable Care Act such as the elimination of gender-based discrimination in insurance prices, recognizing that being a woman is not a preexisting condition that should force women to pay higher premiums. Honda opposed the Stupak–Pitts Amendment to the Affordable Care Act (ACA), which would have prohibited the use of federal funds "to pay for any abortion or to cover any part of the costs of any health plan that includes coverage of abortion" except in cases of rape, incest or danger to the life of the mother. The amendment was dropped by co-author Rep. Bart Stupak in exchange for an executive order promised by President Obama which would address the concerns of the Stupak-Pitts amendment supporters.

Honda has supported Medicare and Medicaid programs throughout his career, fighting for the health rights of seniors and low-income families. He introduced the People's Budget, the Congressional Progressive Caucus 2012 budget alternative, which would keep Medicare and Medicaid solvent while closing the national debt within 10 years.

Honda supports the permanent repeal of the Sustainable Growth Rate (SGR) and cosponsored the SGR Repeal and Medicare Provider Payment Modernization Act of 2014 (H.R. 4015) which would have repealed the SGR and improved the physician payment system to reward value over volume.

=== Human rights ===
On the issue of comfort women, in 2007 Honda proposed US H.Res. 121, which stated that Japan should formally acknowledge, apologize, and accept historical responsibility in a clear and unequivocal manner, refute any claims that the issue of comfort women never occurred, and educate current and future generations "about this horrible crime while following the recommendations of the international community with respect to the 'comfort women'."

Honda stated, "the purpose of this resolution is not to bash or humiliate Japan." On July 30, 2007, the House of Representatives passed Honda's resolution after 30 minutes of debate, in which no opposition was voiced. Honda was quoted on the floor as saying, "We must teach future generations that we cannot allow this to continue to happen. I have always believed that reconciliation is the first step in the healing process." Honda later secured report language in the Fiscal Year 2014 Consolidated Appropriation Act (submitted July 2013) urging the Secretary of State to encourage the Government of Japan to address issues raised in H.Res.121. President Obama signed the spending bill into law on January 17, 2014.

Honda works on the elimination of human trafficking. He cosponsored the Fraudulent Overseas Recruitment and Trafficking Elimination Act of 2013 (H.R. 3344). The bill addresses predatory recruiters who use international labor recruitment as a human trafficking medium. On January 23, 2014, Honda hosted a training at the San Jose International Airport for airport and airline employees on how to detect signs of human trafficking.

Honda is a cosponsor of the Border Security, Economic Opportunity, and Immigration Modernization Act (H.R. 15), which entails comprehensive immigration reform to increase high skill visas, reunite families, and provide a pathway to citizenship for those living in the shadows.

=== LGBT issues ===
Honda has been recognized as a long-time supporter of equality for lesbian, gay, bisexual and transgender people, with a 100% scorecard rating from the Human Rights Campaign since 2001. HRC endorsed Honda for his 2014 reelection. In the 1990s, he supported same-sex partner benefits as a Santa Clara County Supervisor. In 2008, he was a co-founder of the Congressional Equality Caucus, when there were only two openly gay congresspersons. He opposed the use of taxpayer funds to protect the Defense of Marriage Act in the United States Supreme Court.

In 2013, Honda worked with Mayor of Campbell Evan Low to raise awareness for the ban against blood donations from gay and bisexual men. In 2015, Honda revealed in a speech at the event Courageous Conversation, a one-day symposium that addresses how administrators can work to make their schools safer for their students, that his granddaughter Malisa is transgender. "As both an individual, and as an educator, I have experienced and witnessed bullying in its many forms. And as the proud jichan, or grandpa, of a transgender grandchild, I hope that my granddaughter can feel safe going to school without fear of being bullied. I refuse to be a bystander while millions of people are dealing with the effects of bullying on a daily basis."

=== Manufacturing ===
In 2013, Honda introduced the Market Based Manufacturing Incentives Act (H.R. 615), one of the main bills in the Democratic Party's Make it in America Agenda, which would create a commission of private-sector experts to designate market-changing technologies. These technologies would be eligible for a consumer tax credit as long as they are made in the United States. Honda introduced the Scaling Up Manufacturing Act (H.R. 616). The bill would provide companies a 25% tax credit on the costs associated with building their first manufacturing facility in the United States.

Honda was a vocal supporter of the National Network for Manufacturing Innovation proposed by President Obama to help revitalize American manufacturing. He is a cosponsor of the bipartisan Revitalizing American Manufacturing Innovation Act (H.R. 2996) and has urged President Obama to locate a manufacturing hub in Silicon Valley to focus on the domestic development of the next generation of semiconductor manufacturing tools.

Honda used his position as a member of the House Appropriations Committee and the Commerce, Justice, Science Subcommittee to prioritize funding for the National Institute of Standards and Technology's Hollings Manufacturing Extension Partnership (MEP) program which works with small and medium-sized manufacturers to help them create and retain jobs, increase profits, and save time and money.

=== Science and technology ===
As the Representative for the heart of Silicon Valley, Honda has been intimately involved in technology and nanotechnology policy for many years. He has supported the principle of network neutrality, and is a cosponsor of the Open Internet Preservation Act (H.R. 3982).

Honda was critical of the National Security Agency's surveillance of electronic communications as a violation of privacy. He is an original cosponsor of the Uniting and Strengthening America by Fulfilling Rights and Ending Eavesdropping, Dragnet Collection, and Online Monitoring Act (USA FREEDOM ACT - H.R 3361) which seeks to rein in the dragnet collection of data by the NSA, increase transparency of the Foreign Intelligence Surveillance Court, provide businesses the ability to release information regarding FISA requests, and create an independent constitutional advocate to argue cases before the FISC. Honda has been a proponent of government intelligence transparency and has pushed to require that top-line intelligence spending be disclosed during annual budget submission to Congress through his co-sponsorship of the Intelligence Budget Transparency Act (H.R. 3855).

In 2002, he introduced one of the first nanotechnology bills in Congress, the Nanoscience and Nanotechnology Advisory Board Act of 2002, which sought to establish a Nanoscience and Nanotechnology Advisory Board to advise the President on a range of policy matters. Such a board was recommended by the National Research Council in its review of the National nanotechnology Initiative, Small Wonders, Endless Frontiers.

In 2003, he worked with then-Science Committee Chairman Sherwood Boehlert (R-NY), to introduce the Nanotechnology Research and Development Act of 2003.

This bill authorized federal investments in nanotechnology research and development, restructured the National Nanotechnology Initiative to improve interagency coordination and the level of input from outside experts in the field, and laid the path to address novel social, ethical, philosophical, legal, environmental health issues that might arise. H.R. 766 was passed overwhelmingly by the U.S. House of Representatives on May 7, 2003, signed into law on December 3, 2003, and to date has been funded at nearly $4 billion.

Honda continued his interest in nanotechnology by convening the Blue Ribbon Task Force on Nanotechnology with then-controller Steve Westly in 2005. This group met numerous times to discuss and develop strategies to promote the San Francisco Bay Area and all of California as the national and worldwide center for nanotechnology research, development and commercialization. Under the direction of Working Chair Scott Hubbard, then-Director of the National Aeronautics and Space Administration's Ames Research Center, the Task Force spent a year developing recommendations that would assure California a leading position in what could be a trillion-dollar economic sector. The recommendations were included in the BRTFN report, Thinking Big About Thinking Small.

Honda developed two pieces of legislation based on the report: 1) the Nanomanufacturing Investment Act of 2005 and 2) the Nanotechnology Advancement and New Opportunities Act.

Many provisions of these bills were included in larger pieces of legislation, the National Nanotechnology Initiative Amendments Act of 2009 and the America COMPETES Reauthorization Act, that passed the House of Representatives in the 111th Congress.

Mike Honda was recognized by the Foresight Institute, which awarded him its Foresight Institute Government Prize in 2006.

=== Research and development tax credit ===
Congressman Honda has supported expanding and making permanent the Research and Development tax credit, and in the 113th Congress is a cosponsor of the bipartisan H.R. 4438, the American Research and Competitiveness Act of 2014. He has called the research credit, "the best incentive in the tax code to ensure that companies continue to conduct their R&D in the U.S."

=== Seniors and retirement security ===
Honda has been a vocal advocate for expanding the Social Security program. In the 113th Congress, Honda introduced H.R. 3118, the Strengthening Social Security Act, with Congresspersons Linda Sanchez (D-CA) and Rush Holt (D-NJ), which would increase benefits for current beneficiaries, eliminate the cap on how much of an individual's earnings can be paid into Social Security, change the benefits formula to increase payments by about $70 a month, and adopt a higher cost of living adjustment called CPI-E, designed to reflect the cost of healthcare for seniors.

Also in the 113th Congress, Honda authored H.R. 4202, the CPI-E Act of 2014, which would apply CPI-E to index federal retirement programs other than Social Security, to include programs such as civil service retirement, military retirement, Supplemental Security Income, veterans pensions and compensations, and other retirement programs with COLAs triggered directly by Social Security or civil service retirement. As a member of the Congressional Progressive Caucus Budget Taskforce, Honda also inserted this CPI-E provision into the FY 2015 CPC Budget, entitled the "Better Off Budget." Honda said during floor debate on the CPC budget, that the provision was intended to be a first step to applying CPI-E to all federal retirement programs, including Social Security.

=== Veterans ===
Honda has been a leading voice to overhaul and improve the current VA system. As an appropriator, he worked with his colleagues in both parties to not only call for change, but to provide funds to create a new electronic health record program between the Department of Defense and Veterans Affairs. He is also working to ensure that the government makes use of the knowledge and experience of health information technology experts, such as those in Silicon Valley, to ensure this new platform will eliminate the current backlog of claims. Honda helped obtain $2.8 million in grants to aid homeless and at-risk veterans and their families in Silicon Valley.

=== Women's rights ===
Honda has a 100% legislative score from Planned Parenthood and from the National Abortion Rights Action League (NARAL) and has been a long-time supporter of pro-choice legislation and for women's health due to his voting record. Honda has supported Paycheck Fairness Act and voted for the Lily Ledbetter Fair Pay Act — the first piece of legislation to be signed by President Barack Obama in 2009.

During the debate over the new health care bill, Honda voted against the Stupak–Pitts Amendment to the Affordable Care Act (ACA), which would have prohibited the use of federal funds "to pay for any abortion or to cover any part of the costs of any health plan that includes coverage of abortion" except in cases of rape, incest or danger to the life of the mother. The amendment was dropped by its co-author Stupak in exchange for an executive order promised by President Obama which would address the Stupak-Pitts concerns.

In 2013, Honda voted for the reauthorization of the Violence Against Women Act (VAWA), which included updated protections for Native American women, immigrant women, and provided specialized support and resources for LGBT, religious and ethnic communities. VAWA reauthorization also included the Trafficking Victims Protection Reauthorization Act, which Honda has also supported. Honda introduced the Domestic Violence Judicial Support Act of 2013, which would strengthen the judicial programs that comprise the basis of VAWA. To support full implementation of the Obama Administration's Executive Order 13595 and the U.S. National Action Plan (NAP) on Women, Peace, and Security, and to secure Congressional oversight, Honda introduced the Women, Peace, and Security Act of 2013, along his female colleagues Congresswomen Jan Schakowsky, Eddie Bernice Johnson, and Niki Tsongas.

=== Civilian body armor ban ===
In July 2014, Honda introduced a bill to ban level 3 body armor for anyone not in law enforcement. In September, it was referred to the subcommittee on Crime, Terrorism, Homeland Security, and Investigations. This bill would ban anyone except law enforcement and military personnel from obtaining level 3 body armor. He was quoted as saying: "We should be asking ourselves, why is this armor available to just anyone, if it was designed to be used only by our soldiers to take to war?".

=== Ethics investigation ===
It has been alleged that Honda and key members of his congressional staff violated House rules by using taxpayer resources to bolster his 2014 re-election campaign. In September 2015, the House Ethics Committee decided to extend the review of the matter after the Office of Congressional Ethics (OCE) released its report on the allegation. The OCE report noted "there is substantial reason to believe that Representative Honda improperly tied official events to past or potential campaign or political support." As of August 8, 2016, the House Ethics Committee had not decided whether Honda violated House rules.

== Personal life ==
Honda's wife, Jeanne, was a kindergarten teacher at Baldwin Elementary School in San José. She died in 2004. He has two children: Mark, an aerospace engineer, living in Torrance, and Michelle, a marketing and communications manager, in San Jose. Michelle is the mother of one daughter and two sons.

In February 2015, Honda's announcement that he is a "proud jiichan", or grandfather, of his transgender granddaughter Malisa, gained regional, national, and international coverage.

== Electoral history in the U.S. House of Representatives ==
2000 California's 15th congressional district election
Primary election
Party	Candidate	Votes	%
Democratic	Mike Honda	62,876	66.58%
Democratic	Bill Peacock	22,499	23.82%
Democratic	Dick Lane	3,968	4.20%
Democratic	Robin Parker	3,646	3.86%
Democratic	Connor Vlakancic	1,449	1.53%
Total votes		94,438	100.00%
General election
Democratic	Mike Honda	128,545	54.26%
Republican	Jim Cunneen	99,866	42.15%
Libertarian	Ed Wimmers	4,820	2.03%
Natural Law	Douglas C. Gorney	3,591	1.52%
Independent	Phillip Kronzer (write-in)	82	0.03%
Total votes		236,904	100.00%
Democratic gain from Republican			

2002 California's 15th congressional district election
Primary election
Party	Candidate	Votes	%
Democratic	Mike Honda (incumbent)	38,636	100.00%
Total votes		38,636	100.00%
General election
Democratic	Mike Honda (incumbent)	87,482	65.77%
Republican	Linda Rae Hermann	41,251	31.01%
Libertarian	Jeff Landauer	4,289	3.22%
Total votes		133,022	100.00%
Democratic hold			

2004 California's 15th congressional district election
Primary election
Party	Candidate	Votes	%
Democratic	Mike Honda (incumbent)	58,531	100.00%
Total votes		58,531	100.00%
General election
Democratic	Mike Honda (incumbent)	154,385	72.03%
Republican	Raymond L. Chukwu	59,953	27.97%
Total votes		214,338	100.00%
Democratic hold			

2006 California's 15th congressional district election
Primary election
Party	Candidate	Votes	%
Democratic	Mike Honda (incumbent)	49,400	100.00%
Total votes		49,400	100.00%
General election
Democratic	Mike Honda (incumbent)	115,532	72.33%
Republican	Raymond L. Chukwu	44,186	27.67%
Total votes		159,718	100.00%
Democratic hold			

2008 California's 15th congressional district election
Primary election
Party	Candidate	Votes	%
Democratic	Mike Honda (incumbent)	46,642	100.00%
Total votes		46,642	100.00%
General election
Democratic	Mike Honda (incumbent)	170,977	71.66%
Republican	Joyce Stoer Cordi	55,489	23.26%
Green	Peter Myers	12,123	5.08%
Total votes		238,589	100.00%
Democratic hold			

2010 California's 15th congressional district election
Primary election
Party	Candidate	Votes	%
Democratic	Mike Honda (incumbent)	57,662	100.00%
Total votes		57,662	100.00%
General election
Democratic	Mike Honda (incumbent)	126,147	67.60%
Republican	Scott Kirkland	60,468	32.40%
Total votes		186,615	100.00%
Democratic hold			

2012 California's 17th congressional district election
Primary election
Party	Candidate	Votes	%
Democratic	Mike Honda (incumbent)	60,252	66.70%
Republican	Evelyn Li	24,916	27.58%
No party preference	Charles Richardson	5,163	5.72%
Total votes		90,331	100.00%
General election
Democratic	Mike Honda (incumbent)	159,392	73.54%
Republican	Evelyn Li	57,336	26.46%
Total votes		216,728	100.00%
Democratic hold			

2014 California's 17th congressional district election
Primary election
Party	Candidate	Votes	%
Democratic	Mike Honda (incumbent)	43,607	48.18%
Democratic	Ro Khanna	25,384	28.05%
Republican	Vanila Singh	15,359	16.97%
Republican	Joel Van Landingham	6,154	6.80%
Total votes		90,504	100.00%
General election
Democratic	Mike Honda (incumbent)	69,561	51.75%
Democratic	Ro Khanna	64,847	48.25%
Total votes		134,408	100.00%
Democratic hold			

2016 California's 17th congressional district election
Primary election
Party	Candidate	Votes	%
Democratic	Ro Khanna	52,059	39.08%
Democratic	Mike Honda (incumbent)	49,823	37.40%
Republican	Peter Kuo	12,224	9.18%
Republican	Ron Cohen	10,448	7.84%
Democratic	Pierluigi C. Oliverio	5,533	4.15%
Libertarian	Kennita Watson	3,125	2.35%
Total votes		133,212	100.00%
General election
Democratic	Ro Khanna	142,268	61.01%
Democratic	Mike Honda (incumbent)	90,924	38.99%
Total votes		233,192	100.00%
Democratic hold			

== See also ==
- List of Asian Americans and Pacific Islands Americans in the United States Congress

U.S. House of Representatives
Preceded by Tom Campbell	Member of the U.S. House of Representatives from California's 15th congressional district 2001–2013	Succeeded by Eric Swalwell
Preceded by David Wu	Chair of the Congressional Asian Pacific American Caucus; 2004–2011	Succeeded by Judy Chu
Preceded by Sam Farr	Member of the U.S. House of Representatives from California's 17th congressional district 2013–2017	Succeeded by Ro Khanna
U.S. order of precedence (ceremonial)
Preceded by Gary Miller as Former U.S. Representative	Order of precedence of the United States as Former U.S. Representative	Succeeded by Devin Nunes as Former U.S. Representative
