= 2024 San Jose mayoral election =

- March 5, 2024
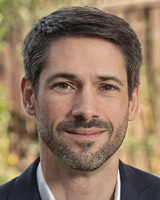

Candidate	Matt Mahan	Tyrone Wade
Popular vote	144,701	22,363
Percentage	86.6%	13.4%
- Results by precinct Mahan: 70–80% 80–90% >90% Wade: 60–70% >90% Other: Tie No data
Mayor before election
Matt Mahan
Elected Mayor
Matt Mahan

The 2024 San Jose mayoral election was held on March 5, 2024, to elect the mayor of San Jose, California, to a four-year term. Incumbent mayor Matt Mahan, who was first elected to a two-year term in 2022, handily won re-election against a minor challenger. This was the first mayoral election in San Jose held during a presidential election cycle following the passage of Measure B in 2022.

== Candidates ==
=== Declared ===
- Matt Mahan, incumbent mayor
- Tyrone Wade, retired marriage counselor and candidate for mayor in 2018

=== Declined ===
- Cindy Chavez, Santa Clara County supervisor and runner-up for mayor in 2022 and 2006

== Endorsements ==
Matt Mahan

Newspapers

- The Mercury News

Organizations

- Silicon Valley Biz PAC

== Results ==
2024 San Jose mayoral election
Candidate	Votes	%
Matt Mahan (incumbent)	144,701	86.61
Tyrone Wade	22,363	13.39
Total votes	167,064	100.00
