= 2022 San Jose mayoral election =

- June 7, 2022 (primary); November 8, 2022 (general)
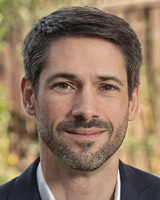

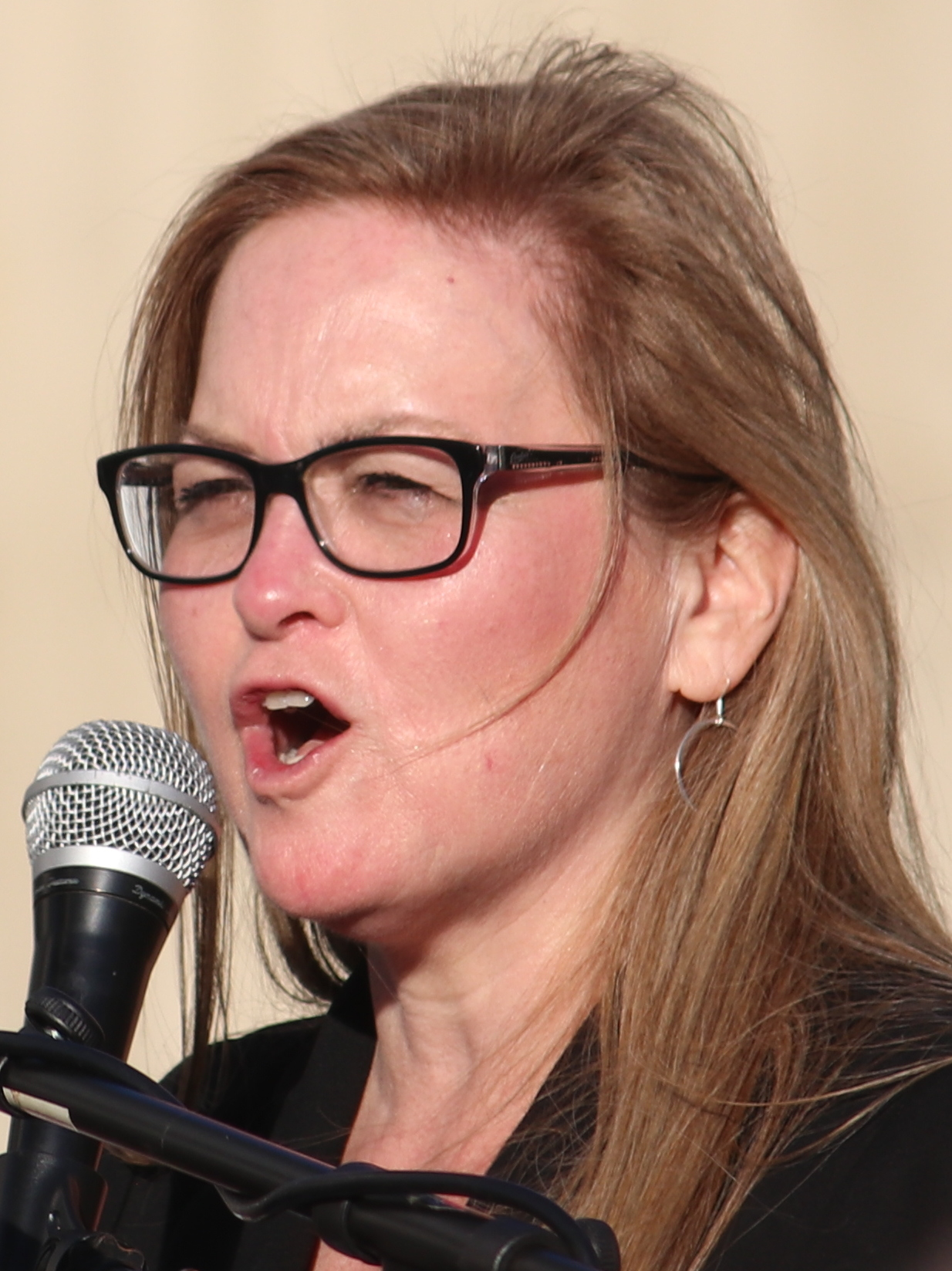
Candidate	Matt Mahan	Cindy Chavez
Popular vote	128,376	122,329
Percentage	51.21%	48.79%
- Results by precinct Mahan: 50–60% 60–70% 70–80% 80–90% >90% Chavez: 50–60% 60–70% 70–80% 80–90% >90% Other: Tie No data
Mayor before election
Sam Liccardo
Elected Mayor
Matt Mahan

The 2022 San Jose mayoral election was held on November 8, 2022, to elect the next mayor of San Jose for a two-year term. A top-two primary was held on June 7, 2022, and no candidate received more than 50% in this primary election. Santa Clara County Supervisor Cindy Chavez and San Jose City Councilmember Matt Mahan advanced to a November 8 runoff election. On November 16, Cindy Chavez conceded the race to Matt Mahan.

Due to San Jose term limits, which sets a maximum of two total terms, incumbent mayor Sam Liccardo was not eligible to run for reelection. The 2022 mayoral election would be the last held on a gubernatorial election cycle, as a result of the passage of Measure B in 2022. Following mayoral elections were to coincide with the presidential election cycle. This meant that the winner of the 2022 election would have a two-year term rather than the standard four years. However, they would be allowed to serve for two full four-year terms afterward, for a total of 10 years. The election was nonpartisan, as are all local elections in California.

== Background ==
San Jose is the 10th largest city in the United States. All local elections in the State of California are officially nonpartisan. San Jose uses a top-two primary system; if no candidate received a majority of the June 7, 2022 vote, a runoff would be held between the top two candidates on November 8, 2022.

On April 28, 2021, San Jose Councilmember Raul Peralez, who then represented Council District 3, Downtown San Jose, announced his candidacy. On the same day, Councilmember Dev Davis, who represented District 6, Willow Glen, also announced a campaign for mayor.

== Primary candidates ==
=== Declared ===
- Cindy Chavez, President of the Santa Clara County Board of Supervisors (2020–present), former vice mayor of San Jose (2005–2007), former San Jose city councilmember for District 3 (1998–2006), and candidate for mayor in 2006 (Democratic)
- Dev Davis, San Jose city councilmember, District 6 (2016–present) (Independent)
- Travis Hill, student
- Matt Mahan, San Jose city councilmember, District 10 (2021–present) (Democratic)
- Raul Peralez, San Jose city councilmember, District 3 (2014–present) (Democratic)
- James Spence, former San Jose police officer (Republican)
- Marshall Woodmansee, San Jose State University student (Independent)

=== Disqualified ===
- Jonathan Esteban, candidate for Nevada's 4th congressional district in 2020

== Primary election ==
=== Endorsements ===
Cindy Chavez (D)

Executive branch officials

- Norman Mineta, 14th United States Secretary of Transportation (2001–2006); 33rd United States Secretary of Commerce (2000–2001); U.S. Representative (1975–1995); 59th Mayor of San Jose (1971–1975) (deceased)

U.S. Representatives

- Anna Eshoo, U.S. Representative from CA-18 (1993–)
- Mike Honda, former U.S. Representative from CA-17 (2001–2017)
- Ro Khanna, U.S. Representative from CA-17 (2017–)
- Zoe Lofgren, U.S. Representative from CA-19 (1995–)

State legislators

- Ash Kalra, California State Assemblymember from the 27th District (2016-); former San Jose District 2 Councilmember.
- Evan Low, California State Assemblymember from the 28th district (2014–); former Mayor of Campbell (2009–2014)

Municipal officials

- All currently serving San Jose City Council members (Post Primary)

Labor unions

- South Bay Labor Council

Organizations

- Santa Clara County Democratic Party
Matt Mahan (D)

Federal officials

- Ann Ravel, former chair of the Federal Election Commission and former counsel to Santa Clara County

Municipal officials

- Sam Liccardo, incumbent Mayor of San Jose (2015–)

Organizations

- Silicon Valley Association of Republican Women

Newspapers and other publications

- The Mercury News
Raul Peralez (D)

Municipal officials

- Sylvia Arenas, San Jose City Councilmember from the 8th district (2016–)
- Magdalena Carrasco, San Jose City Councilmember from the 5th district (2014–)
- Maya Esparza, San Jose City Councilmember from the 7th district (2018–)
- Ron Gonzales, 63rd Mayor of San Jose (1999–2007)
- Sergio Jimenez, San Jose City Councilmember from the 2nd district (2020–)

=== Polling ===
Poll source	Date(s) administered	Sample size (Note: Key: A – all adults RV – registered voters LV – likely voters V – unclear)	Margin of error	Cindy Chavez	Dev Davis	Matt Mahan	Raul Peralez	Undecided
FM3 Research (D) (Note: This poll was sponsored by Mahan's campaign.)	February 24 – March 1, 2022	587 (LV)	± 4.0%	27%	5%	17%	7%	44%
Tulchin Research (D) (Note: This poll was sponsored by Peralez's campaign.)	February 5–10, 2022	500 (LV)	± 4.4%	28%	6%	7%	13%	40%
New Bridge Strategy (R)	June 28 – July 1, 2021	400 (LV)	± 4.9%	23%	4%	5%	7%	59%

=== Results ===
Primary results (June 7, 2022)
Candidate	Votes	%
Cindy Chavez	65,501	39.13
Matt Mahan	54,076	32.30
Dev Davis	18,235	10.89
Raul Peralez	15,121	9.03
James Spence	11,549	6.90
Travis Hill	1,722	1.03
Marshall Woodmansee	1,199	0.72
Total votes	167,403	100.00

== General election ==
=== Results ===
General election (November 8, 2022)
Candidate	Votes	%
Matt Mahan	128,376	51.21
Cindy Chavez	122,329	48.79
Total votes	250,705	100.00

== Notes ==
Partisan clients
