= Matt Mahan =

American politician and tech entrepreneur (born 1982)

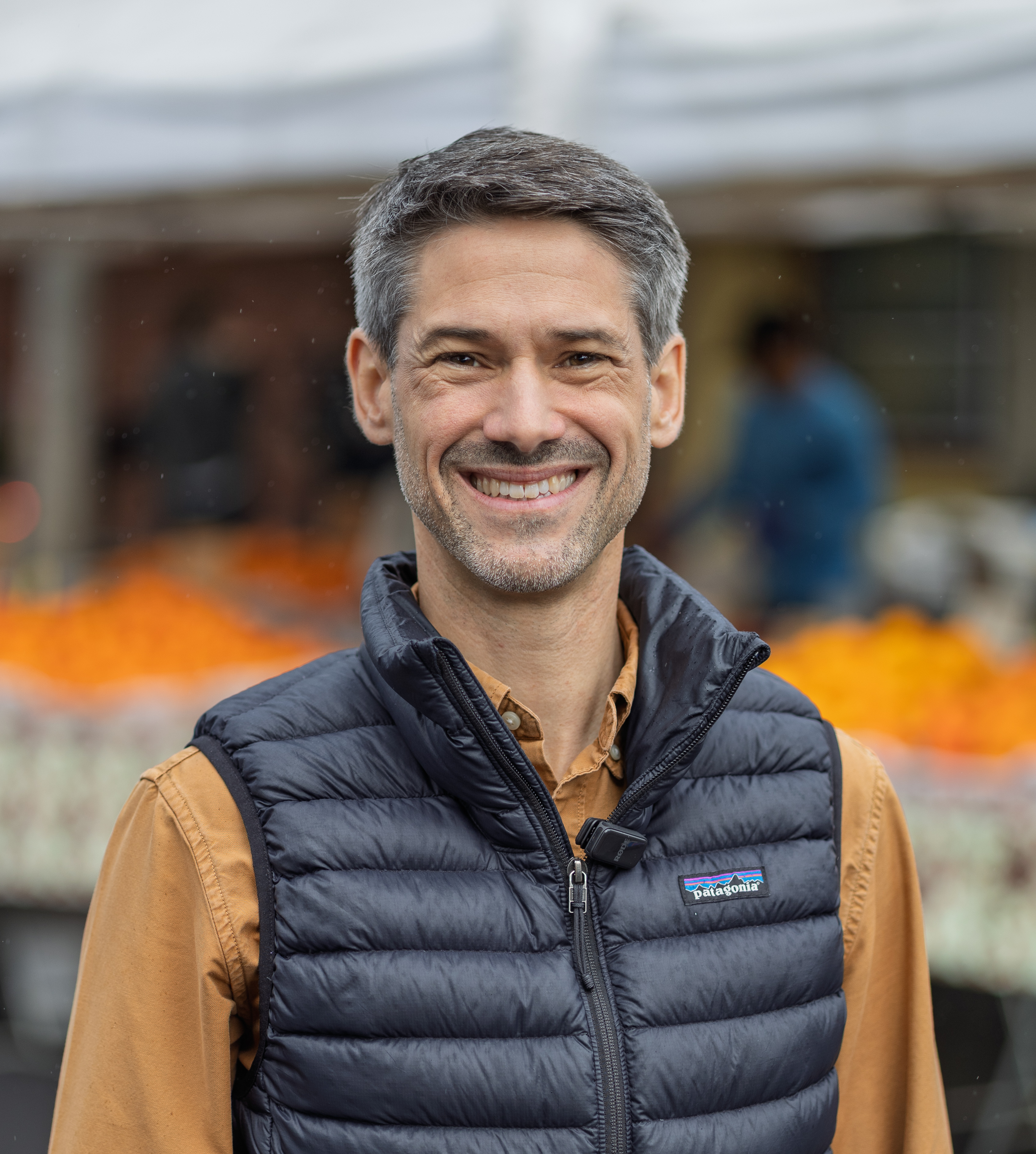
- Mahan in 2026

66th Mayor of San Jose
- Incumbent
- Assumed office January 1, 2023
- Preceded by: Sam Liccardo

Member of the San Jose City Council from the 10th district
- In office January 5, 2021 – January 1, 2023
- Preceded by: Johnny Khamis
- Succeeded by: Arjun Batra

Personal details
- Born: Matthew William Mahan; November 18, 1982 (age 43) San Francisco, California, U.S.
- Party: Democratic
- Spouse: Silvia-Wedad Scandar (m. 2012)
- Children: 2
- Education: Harvard University (BA)
- Website: Campaign website

Matthew William Mahan (/ˈmeɪhæn/ MAY-han) (born November 18, 1982) is an American technology entrepreneur and politician serving as the 66th mayor of San Jose, California since 2023. A member of the Democratic Party, he previously served as a member of the San Jose City Council from 2021 until 2023. He was the co-founder and CEO of Brigade Media, a technology company focused on civic engagement, and was a candidate in the 2026 California gubernatorial election.

== Early life and education ==
Mahan was born in San Francisco, California, and was raised in Watsonville, California. His father was a letter carrier and his mother was a schoolteacher; he stated that his family lived "paycheck to paycheck" in a working-class community. Raised Catholic, he attended Bellarmine College Preparatory on a low-income scholarship. While in high school, Mahan worked with former state senator Jim Beall and former Santa Clara counsel Ann Ravel.

Mahan graduated magna cum laude from Harvard University in 2005 with a degree in social studies. He served as president of the Harvard Undergraduate Council. He also received a Michael C. Rockefeller Memorial Fellowship to Bolivia, where he spent the year after graduation working on economic development projects.

== Professional career ==
Mahan spent a year building irrigation systems in Bolivia and then joined Teach for America where he was matched to Alum Rock Middle School in San Jose and taught seventh and eighth grade English and history from 2006 to 2008.

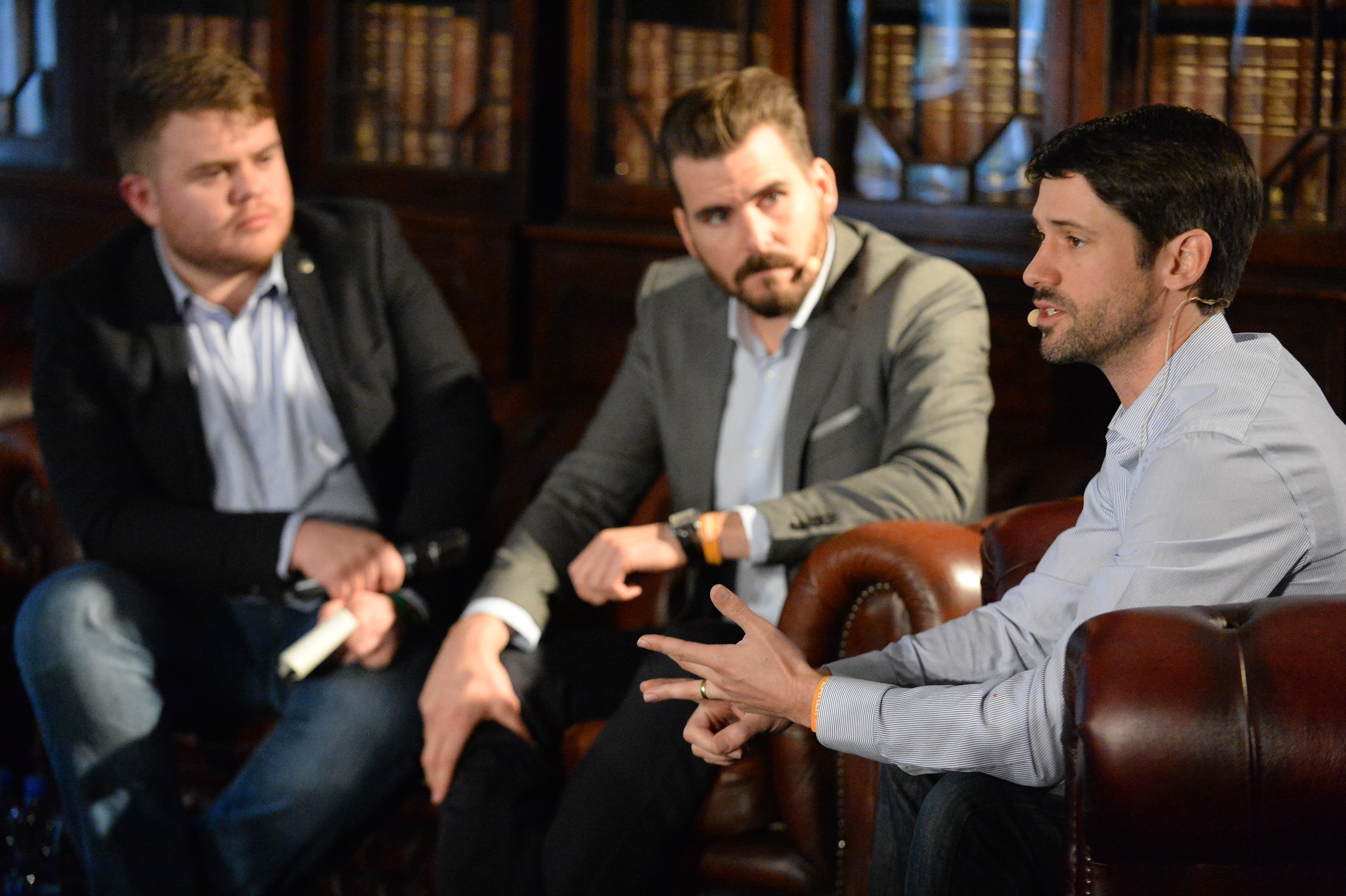
Mahan speaking at Web Summit 2015

In 2008, Mahan joined a tech startup led by Sean Parker and Joe Green. Together, they formed Causes, a for-profit civic technology Facebook application. Mahan became CEO and president of Causes in 2013.

In 2014, Mahan launched Brigade with investments from Parker, Ron Conway, Marc Benioff, and others. Brigade was created as a social medium for civic engagement. In 2019, Brigade was acquired by Pinterest and its technology was purchased by Countable.

== Political career ==
=== San Jose City Council ===
In early 2020, Mahan entered the San Jose City Council District 10 race and was endorsed by Santa Clara county assessor Larry Stone, then-mayor Sam Liccardo, then-vice mayor Chappie Jones, and city council members Lan Diep and Pam Foley. The Business San Jose Chamber Political Action Committee also endorsed him, saying they supported Mahan's plan to spend tax dollars appropriately and reduce tax burdens to encourage business growth in the city and wanted a transparent government. He won the seat with 58% of the vote, succeeding term-limited incumbent Johnny Khamis and took office in January 2021. He was elected for a four-year term. Arjun Batra was appointed to fill his vacated seat in 2023, after Mahan was elected mayor.

=== Mayor of San Jose ===
==== Campaigns ====
In September 2021, Mahan became a candidate for mayor of San Jose. He proposed an accountability dashboard which would track progress on issues like crime and homelessness. He pledged to end automatic raises for politicians and city department heads unless progress is shown. Mahan received the endorsement of three former mayors of the city, including Liccardo, who stated that he liked Mahan's commonsense and realistic solutions and disliked Cindy Chavez's campaign of fear politics.

In November 2022, he was elected mayor of San Jose, defeating Santa Clara County supervisor Cindy Chavez. That same year, San Jose passed Measure B, which would align mayoral elections with presidential elections. As a result, Mahan's term would be two years, rather than the standard four-year term.

He was re-elected in 2024 with marginal opposition, defeating minor candidate Tyrone Wade with 86.6% of the vote. He was elected for a four-year term.

==== Tenure ====
Mahan opposed an August 2023 deal with San Jose's municipal unions that raised employee wages and increased paid parental leave, arguing that the increased cost would lead to a budget deficit and force the city to cut services. The deal did not require his approval to go into effect.

Between January and May 2026, Mahan missed seven of 19 city council meetings while campaigning for governor. The absences occurred as the city worked to close a projected $50 million budget deficit.

=== 2026 California gubernatorial campaign ===
On January 29, 2026, Mahan announced his candidacy in the 2026 California gubernatorial election to succeed Democratic incumbent Gavin Newsom, who is term-limited. Politico and ABC noted that Mahan's campaign received support from Silicon Valley donors, including Google cofounder Sergey Brin, and Palantir co-founder Joe Lonsdale. He was endorsed by U.S. representative and his mayoral predecessor Sam Liccardo and public support from Y Combinator CEO Garry Tan, Kraken co-CEO Arjun Sethi, and Founders Fund CMO Mike Solana.

In April, nonprofit founder Raul Claros filed a complaint with the California Fair Political Practices Commission alleging improper coordination with an independent expenditure committee by joining a call where the committee discussed strategy with Rick Caruso and Michael Moritz. By May, SF Gate reported that Mahan's campaign had drawn in nearly $40 million but that polls showed him with between 4% and 10% support among likely voters. The same month, a pro-Mahan independent expenditure committee shut down and another refunded a $1 million donation from Netflix CEO Reed Hastings.

Mahan was eliminated in the primary, conceding minutes after initial votes were released.

== Policy positions ==
Mahan's political support has included business-aligned groups, while labor organizations have criticized his policies.

=== Police and public safety ===
In his first address as mayor, Mahan focused on public safety and outlined efforts to reform San Jose’s booking process in coordination with the county district attorney. He advocated expanding the use of law enforcement technologies, including license plate readers and speed cameras.

In 2023 and 2024, Mahan publicly supported stronger enforcement against drug trafficking while also promoting expanded treatment options. In 2024, in contrast to other state Democratic leaders, he endorsed California Proposition 36, which increased sentences for certain theft and drug related crimes. Mahan has argued that prior reforms had contributed to increases in drug-related deaths, theft, and homelessness.

In October 2024, Mahan and other city council members called for the resignation of councilmember Omar Torres following allegations against him of child sexual misconduct. After weeks of investigation and pressure from the public, and other members of the local government, Torres stepped down and was subsequently arrested.

=== Elections and redistricting ===
In 2025, as California's Proposition 50 (a measure authorizing temporary legislatively drawn congressional maps) headed to the ballot, Mahan criticized Governor Gavin Newsom's combative approach to state/national politics and said he would reluctantly support the measure despite concerns about partisan redistricting.

=== Affordable housing ===
In 2020, voters approved Measure E to fund permanent affordable housing through a property transfer tax. In 2022, Mahan decreased the funds made available to affordable housing to prioritize shelter construction, quick-build communities, and temporary housing. His administration proposed redirecting portions of Measure E funds toward temporary homeless housing in the 2024–25 budget, prompting debate over the balance between permanent affordable housing and short-term shelter.

== Personal life ==
Mahan married Silvia-Wedad Scandar in 2012. The couple met at Harvard in their freshman year at school. They have two children and live in San Jose's Almaden Valley neighborhood.

Political offices
Preceded by Sam Liccardo	Mayor of San Jose; 2023–present	Incumbent
