= Sam Liccardo =

American politician (born 1970)

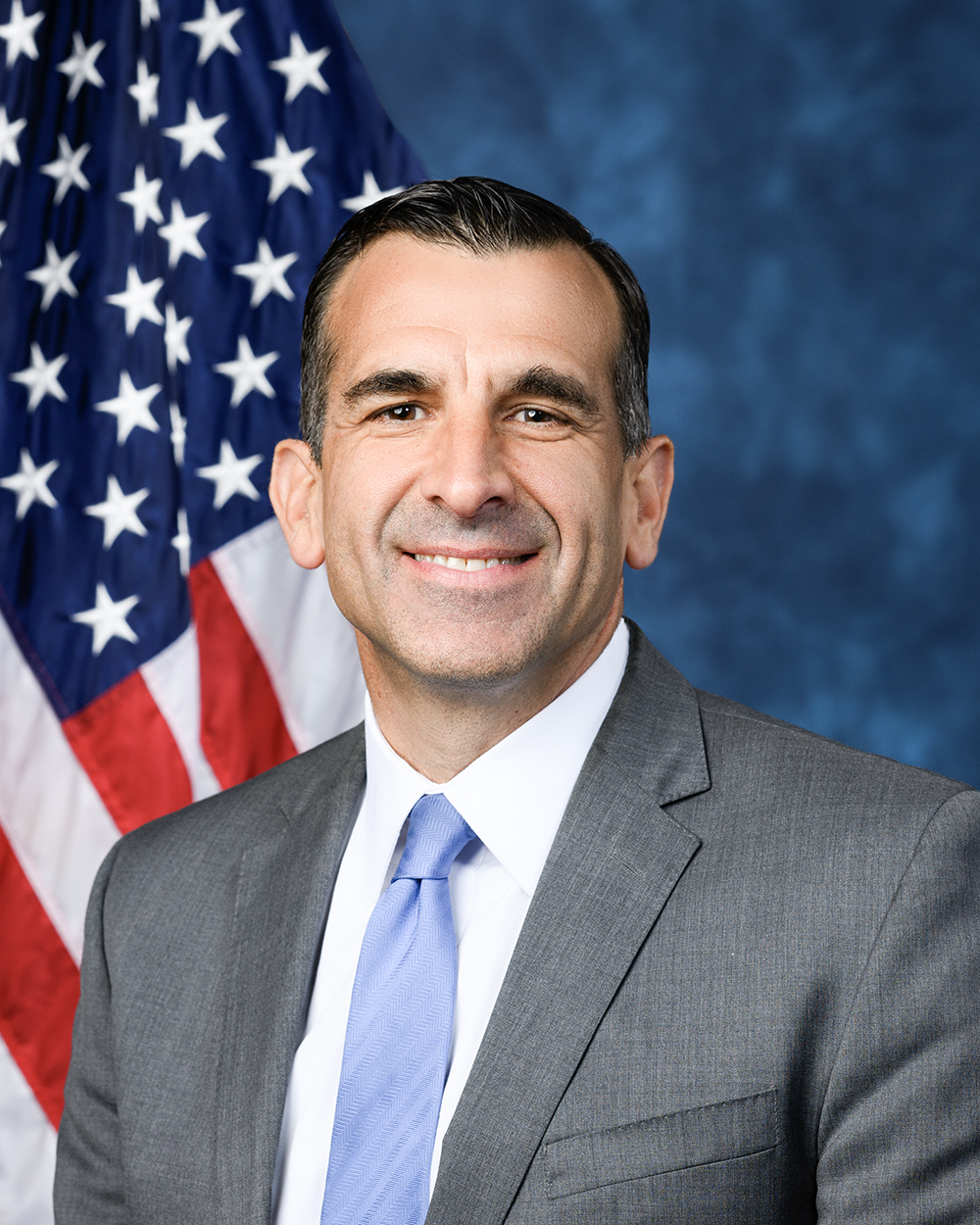
- Official portrait, 2025

Member of the U.S. House of Representatives from California's 16th district
- Incumbent
- Assumed office January 3, 2025
- Preceded by: Anna Eshoo

65th Mayor of San Jose
- In office January 1, 2015 – January 1, 2023
- Preceded by: Chuck Reed
- Succeeded by: Matt Mahan

Member of the San Jose City Council from the 3rd district
- In office January 1, 2007 – December 31, 2014
- Preceded by: Cindy Chavez
- Succeeded by: Raul Peralez

Personal details
- Born: Samuel Theodore Liccardo; April 16, 1970 (age 56) Saratoga, California, U.S.
- Party: Democratic
- Spouse: Jessica Garcia-Kohl (m. 2013)
- Education: Georgetown University (BA); Harvard University (MPP, JD)
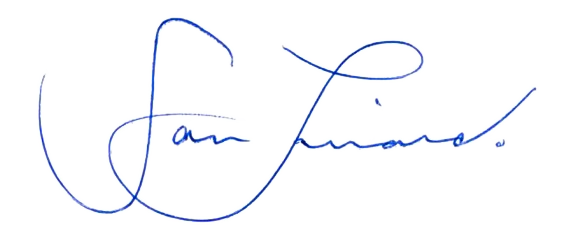
- Signature
- Website: House website Campaign website

Samuel Theodore Liccardo (born April 16, 1970) is an American attorney and politician currently serving as the U.S. representative from California's 16th congressional district. Previously, he served as the 65th mayor of San Jose from 2015 to 2023. A member of the Democratic Party, Liccardo was elected mayor in November 2014. He was reelected in 2018 with 75.8% of the vote. As the leader of the California Big City Mayors Coalition, Liccardo advocated on statewide issues including homelessness and COVID-19 response.

== Early life and education ==
Sam Liccardo was one of five children of Salvador and Laura (née Aceves) Liccardo. He was named for his paternal grandfather, who owned and operated a neighborhood grocery store in downtown San Jose, the Notre Dame Market. Liccardo is of Sicilian and Irish descent, and also of Mexican Californio ancestry, tracing his ancestors to the early Californio inhabitants of the Bay Area and to more recent Mexican immigrants who worked in the Almaden mines.

Liccardo grew up in Saratoga, California, and graduated from Bellarmine College Preparatory in 1987. Liccardo received a bachelor's degree in government from Georgetown University, where he graduated magna cum laude and Phi Beta Kappa. He later earned his Juris Doctor and Master of Public Policy at Harvard Law School and Harvard Kennedy School. Prior to his election to public office in 2006 he served as a criminal prosecutor in the Santa Clara County District Attorney's office.

== San Jose City Councilman ==
In 2006, Liccardo ran for San Jose's District 3 Council seat. After placing first in an eight-candidate June primary with 43% percent of the vote, Liccardo went on to place first in the November runoff election, this time with 61.3%. In June 2010, he won his reelection to the City Council with 80.16% of the primary vote.

As councilman, Liccardo pushed for more affordable housing, championing an inclusionary zoning ordinance in 2008 that required developers to either build 15% of their units in any project to be affordable and rent-restricted, or to pay fees to finance affordable housing construction elsewhere. The statewide homebuilding industry vocally opposed the measure, and sued after its passage; subsequent litigation prevented its implementation until the California Supreme Court eventually sided with the City of San Jose in 2015. Liccardo also advocated for more high-rise housing in San José's downtown, including the construction of the $135 million, 23-story high rise at One South Market.

== Mayor of San Jose ==
=== 2014 election ===
In 2014, Liccardo ran for Mayor of San Jose to succeed termed-out Mayor Chuck Reed. He placed second to County Supervisor Dave Cortese in a five-candidate June primary with 25.7% of the vote, but placed first in the November runoff with 50.8% of the vote. The contentious run-off election focused on the city's chronic budgetary challenges, as well as Liccardo's support for pension reforms led by Mayor Reed that had City employee unions and their allies heavily supporting Cortese. Liccardo's financial support emanated primarily from the tech business community, but he also had support of several environmental organizations.

=== Pension reform ===
In the decade prior to his election as mayor, San Jose saw retiree pension and health care contributions nearly quadruple as a result of retroactive benefit increases, poor market returns, and rapidly rising unfunded liabilities. In order to offset rising retirement contributions, the city council enacted steep budget cuts, cutting the payroll by more than one thousand employees. As a consequence, San Jose became the major U.S. city with the most thinly-staffed city hall and ranked 49th out of the largest 50 U.S. cities in police staffing as of 2020.

In his first year in office, he helped guide negotiations on an agreement with all 11 of city's employee unions that closed the retiree healthcare plan to new employees, predicted to save the city $3 billion in employee retirement costs over the course of three decades. In the 2016 elections, voters approved the agreement by passing Measure F with more than 61% of the vote. This measure supplanted a more contentious pension reform plan, which has faced a series of legal challenges since its 2012 passage. By 2022, San Jose's budget director reported that pension and retiree healthcare obligations had begun declining, enabling projections for balanced budgets for the following five years.

=== Transportation ===
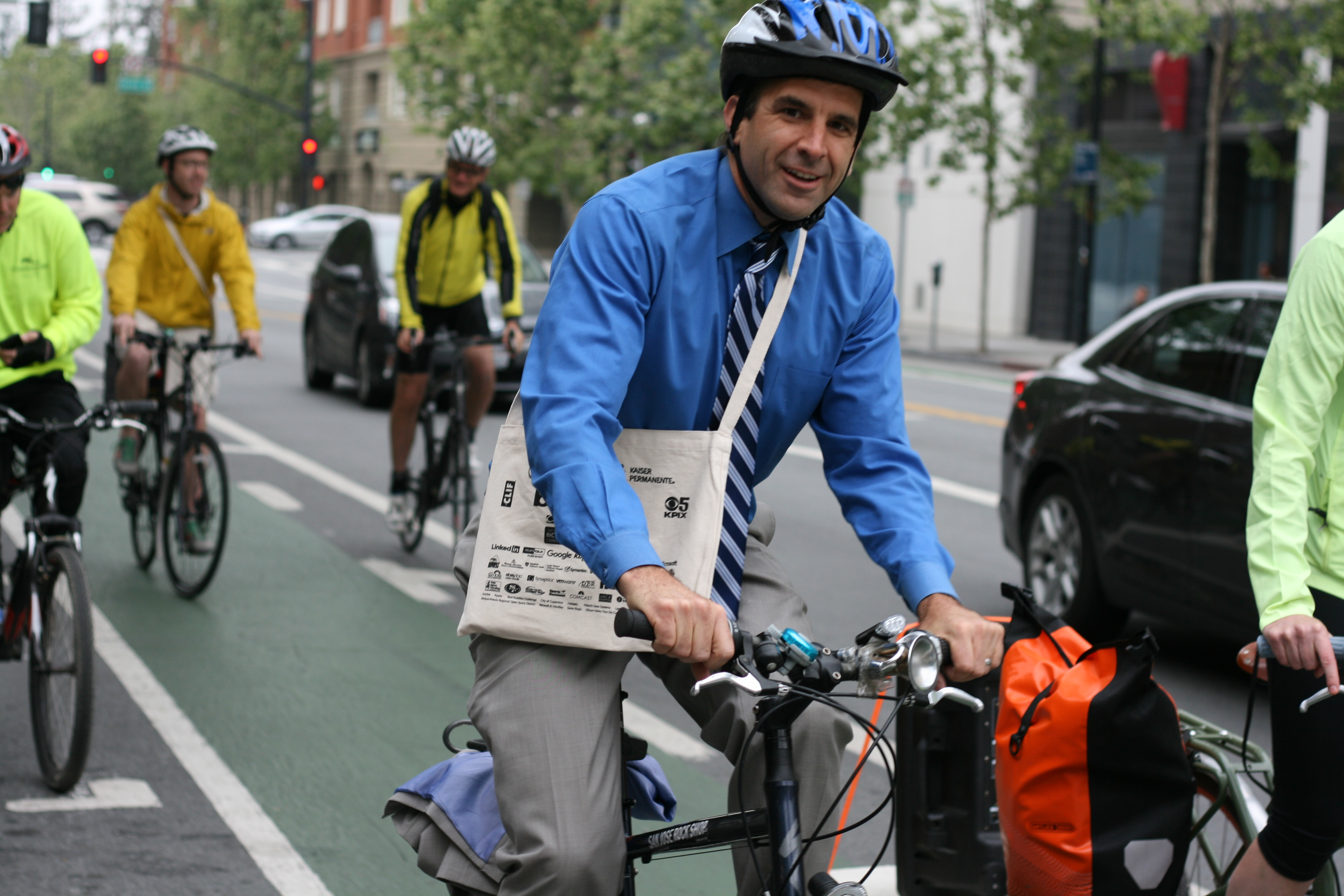
Sam Liccardo biking in downtown San Jose

As Mayor, Liccardo has pushed for transit, cycling, and other alternatives to the automobile in San Jose, a city that grew rapidly in an auto-dominated, suburban model in the 1950s and 60s. Both during his time as City Councilmember and mayor, Liccardo served as a board member of the Valley Transportation Authority (VTA) (which he chaired twice) and Metropolitan Transportation Commission (MTC), advocating for the creation of a bikeshare program, expansion of Bay Area Rapid Transit (BART) to San Jose, and for the launch of the region's first bus-rapid-transit line, all of which began operations during his mayoral tenure. Liccardo was a leading advocate and fundraiser for several ballot measures to fund transit improvements that most notably included funding for the extension of BART to Downtown San Jose, most recently for the $6.3 billion VTA Measure B in 2016, and Regional Measure 3 in 2018. Measure B's passage by more than 70% of the voters did not settle the matter, as lawsuits and controversy ensued from some who opposed the tax as well as specific projects in the measure, but the lawsuit has since been resolved.

Liccardo was also instrumental in forging a consensus among Bay Area regional leaders to support putting Measure RR on the ballot, the passage of which in November 2020 will help preserve and expand Caltrain transit service, connecting San Jose and Santa Clara County with San Francisco. Liccardo has been a strong advocate of bringing High Speed Rail to Silicon Valley and the Bay Area, and has worked to secure regional dollars to pay for a share of that construction of that line, which has already commenced in the segment running through California's Central Valley. Liccardo has also urged more innovative approaches to supplant the region's plodding, poorly performing light rail, such as autonomous, electric bus rapid-transit.

As a cyclist, Liccardo long advocated for physically separated bike lanes, and under his tenure, a "Better Bikeways" network of bike lanes separated from vehicular traffic by buffers and low-cost bollards has emerged throughout the Downtown, and increasingly in surrounding neighborhoods.

=== "Smart City Vision" ===
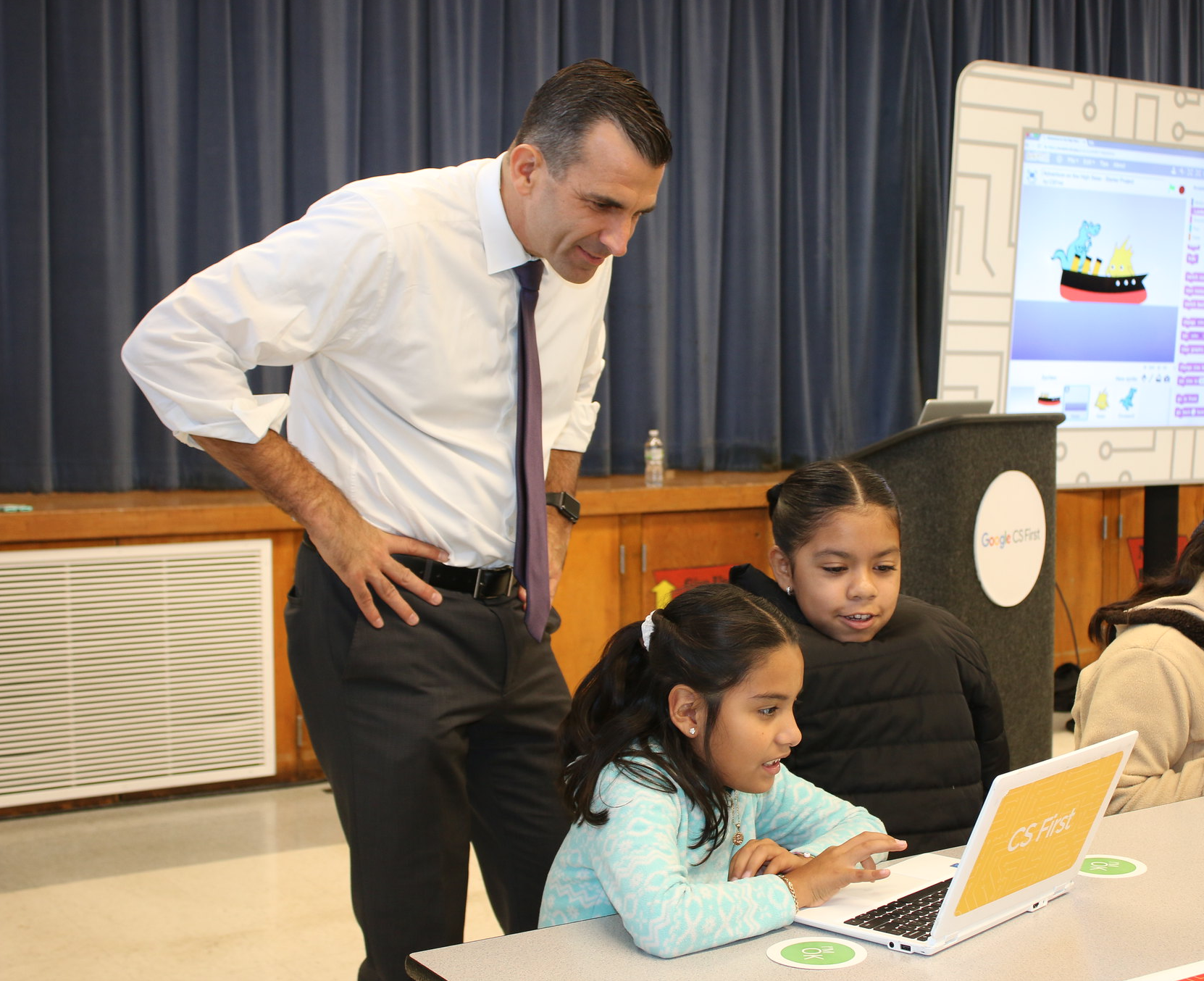
Sam Liccardo attends a Google-sponsored computer science education event

In March 2016, Liccardo unveiled a "Smart City Vision", with the expressed goal to make San José the "most innovative city in America by 2020." Liccardo hired Shireen Santosham to be his Chief Innovation Officer and lead the newly created Mayor's Office of Technology and Innovation (MOTI). The Smart City Vision received unanimous approval from the City Council in March, and in June 2016 the city created an Office of Civic Innovation to meet its goals. Since then, Liccardo formed a partnership with Facebook to deploy the company's wireless, high-speed internet technology called "Terragraph" in downtown San José, and the City of San José launched a project to bring free wireless internet to two schools in San José's East Side Union High School District.

In 2019, Liccardo launched the San José Digital Inclusion Fund, a $24 million initiative to bridge the digital divide in San Jose by extending broadband, distributing devices, and improving digital skills among tens of thousands of low-income families. The pandemic accelerated the city's efforts, resulting in distribution of free hotspots to 15,800 children by October 2020, with another 50,000 residents receiving broadband service through the city's Wi-Fi partnership with the East Side Union High School District. After Council approved funding in late 2020, Liccardo announced the city's progress of reaching 100,000 residents, along with plan to connect 300,000 East San Jose residents—the population of a city the size of Pittsburgh or St. Louis—by full build-out in 2022.

Other partnerships emerged through the city's innovation work under Liccardo's lead. For example, San José became the first city to launch a "Cash for Trash" program, in partnership with Mastercard, to enable homeless residents to earn and safely keep money in exchange for cleaning the city's streets, neighborhoods, and creeks. Mastercard's CityKey technology enabled unhoused to safely keep cash, while preventing purchases in such businesses as liquor stores, and could be used to facilitate the provision of health and other services.

Airbnb and San Jose partnered on several housing-related initiatives that leveraged innovative uses of the AirBnB platform in San José as a pilot city. The "Open Homes" program help victims of natural disaster find emergency housing with an AirBnB host without cost, and since its launch in San José, now serves cities globally. Another San Jose and AirBnB partnership with the nonprofit Bill Wilson Center and San José State University provides AirBnB sponsor homes for unhoused college students for extended durations.

Recognizing San Jose's success in its digital inclusion efforts, as well as their use of data, analytics, and technology in such initiatives as improving emergency medical response, identifying high-risk traffic crash corridors, and responding to vulnerable residents during the pandemic, Government Technology ranked San José No. 1 among large U.S. cities in its Digital Cities Survey in 2020.

In 2022, Liccardo appointed Clay Garner to lead the Mayor's Office of Technology and Innovation.

=== Housing crisis ===
Throughout Liccardo's tenure, many San Jose residents suffered under very high rent burdens attributable in part to California's housing shortage. To boost housing supply, Liccardo led efforts to reduce fees on construction of granny units and Downtown high-rises, increase housing densities—including such innovative approaches such as "coliving—near transit, and streamline approvals of "backyard homes," also known as alternate dwelling units.

Liccardo has also pushed for more public resources for affordable housing, building on his work on inclusionary housing as a councilmember. In 2018, he led a coalition of affordable housing advocates to propose Measure V, a $450 million housing bond measure which secured 64% of the vote, but still narrowly failed due to California's 2/3 threshold for passage of bond measures. Liccardo vowed to push to find a successful alternative, and in 2019, he partnered with SiliconValley@Home and other affordable housing organizations to put Measure E—a supplemental transfer tax on properties sold for $2 million or more—on the March 2020 ballot. The measure passed with 53% support, and will generate up to an estimated $70 million annually for affordable housing and homeless response.

San Jose's efforts to house its 6,000 homeless residents have been hindered by the extremely high costs of housing construction in the region. In response, Liccardo pushed to find more innovative, cost-effective ways to house the homeless, including the use of prefabricated and modular construction, construction of "tiny homes," and the rehabilitation of deteriorating motels. With the non-profit Destination:Home, he also pushed to find collaborative approaches with landlords to take more homeless veterans as tenants; on Veteran's Day in 2015, he and Santa Clara County Supervisor Dave Cortese launched the "All the Way Home" campaign with Destination:Home. One year after launching the program, the group announced it had found homes for more than 500 homeless veterans, and had housed 1,940 by 2020.

In late 2017, Liccardo called for the construction of 25,000 new housing units in San Jose, including 10,000 affordable units. Liccardo since publicly admitted that the lack of housing affordability and homelessness have persisted as crises for which he had made insufficient progress, and is very unlikely to reach those goals, particularly as a severe recession, pandemic, the failure of Measure V, and high construction costs have inhibited progress.

=== 2017 Coyote Creek flood ===
On February 21–22, 2017, after one month of heavy rainfall, Anderson Dam overspilled, causing the Coyote Creek flooded in central San Jose, displacing 14,000 people. Residents complained that the city failed to uphold its duty to protect and warn its citizens. Liccardo and other city officials accepted responsibility for failures to warn residents in their emergency response, but also pointed to very inaccurate flood projections and warnings from the regional agency responsible for flood protection in the county, the Santa Clara Valley Water District.

=== Environment and energy ===
Liccardo's environmental initiatives have focused on preserving open space, halting sprawling development, launching a community choice energy program, and reducing GhG emissions in energy consumption, building design, and transportation. In 2015, Liccardo publicly expressed a desire to halt plans for large-scale development in Coyote Valley—an environmentally sensitive, little-developed area south of San Jose—instead preserving it as wildlife habitat and open space for future generations. Working with the Peninsula Open Space Trust and the Open Space Authority, a plan was assembled to purchase large tracts of land to preserve the Valley, using philanthropic and public sources. In 2018, Liccardo proposed and led Measure T, a bond measure that would enable the use of $50 million for purchase of open space to risks of flooding and wildfires, targeting Coyote Valley. After overwhelming support of Measure T from the electorate the City worked with POST and OSA to consummate a transaction for almost 1,000 acres of land, and the Council unanimously approved it.

In 2018, the development company Ponderosa Homes sought to build approximately 1,000 single-family luxury homes in the mostly undeveloped Evergreen foothills of San Jose, in contravention of the city's General Plan. They spent $6 million to urge voters to approve Measure B what they characterized as the "Evergreen Senior Homes Initiative." Liccardo led a coalition of environmental organizations, neighborhood leaders, and community groups to defeat Measure B despite being badly outspent. Liccardo and the group further proposed and won voter approval for another initiative, Measure C, which sharply limits development in the hillsides and rural edges of the city, to avoid future attempts by developers to bypass the General Plan with heavily funded ballot measures.

Under Liccardo's tenure, San Jose followed an aggressive agenda to decarbonize its grid and to reduce greenhouse gas emissions. In May 2017, Liccardo urged, and the San Jose City Council unanimously agreed to launch a Community Choice Energy program, becoming the largest city in the country to do so. Mayor Liccardo advocated for the adoption of a Community Choice Energy program as a way to take action against climate change while President Trump's administration turned back to fossil fuels. San Jose Clean Energy, as the new utility is called, provides nearly every San Jose resident and business with electricity generated 92% from carbon-free sources, such as solar and hydroelectric. Two years later, San Jose became the largest U.S. city to adopt mandates of all-electric new construction for all new buildings, with a few limited exceptions.

=== Economic development ===
During Liccardo's tenure prior to the pandemic, San Jose underwent an unprecedented expansion of tech employers, with announcements of new campuses from major companies such as Amazon, Apple, Google, Micron, Microsoft, NetApp, Verizon, and Western Digital, as well as fast-growing tech companies, such as Okta, Roku, Splunk, and Supermicro. San Jose also saw major expansions from its headquartered companies, such as Adobe, Broadcom, and Zoom. Liccardo's relationship with technology companies, and particularly his fundraising from tech companies for philanthropic and political purposes, became a topic of ongoing media scrutiny.

Although Liccardo aggressively sought to lure and grow tech in San Jose, he adamantly refused to offer any public subsidies—through incentives, tax breaks, or fee reductions—for that purpose, insisting that tech leaders placed far greater emphasis on access to talent and infrastructure, and that any public expenditure would be wasted. After Amazon generated extensive national news coverage for its "beauty contest" of cites for its "HQ2" campus, Liccardo wrote an op-ed in the Wall Street Journal asserting that San Jose would not offer any public subsidies or tax breaks—and urging other cities to follow suit.

The planned Google development in San Jose's Downtown West—comprising more than six million square feet of office space, retail, restaurants, and thousands of apartments in an urban village around the Downtown transit center, became a major focus during Liccardo's tenure. For several years before the 2017 announcement, Liccardo had repeatedly sought to encourage Google to consider a Downtown campus, and in late 2016, met with executives to discuss plans for an expansive project that would comprise twice the size of Apple's nearby global headquarters.

Although the project appeared popular with most San Jose residents, based on polling showing more than 70% support for the development, a growing tech backlash, or "techlash" emerged from some progressive and union-affiliated groups over the impact of tech's growth on rising housing costs and displacement. They protested over the impacts of Google's growth on homelessness and already-high housing costs, and criticized Liccardo for his private meetings with Google executives for several months prior to the June 2017 public announcement of the deal, as well as his signing of a "nondisclosure agreement" during the time in which the company sought to avoid the price-inflating effect of public knowledge of Google's intentions while it was purchasing dozens of privately owned parcels in the Downtown area. Liccardo countered that no negotiation with Google over the public land purchase transpired until after the public announcement, and that dozens of public meetings transpired to ensure full scrutiny of the project before Council approval. Liccardo was also criticized for failing to disclose a Downtown condominium that his wife owned prior to their 2013 marriage until 2018—a disclosure that occurred prior to the council's approval of the Google deal, but after negotiations had commenced. Liccardo apologized for failing to sooner include his wife's property in his annual public financial disclosures, but the City Attorney concluded that there was no legal conflict of interest because the condo was not sufficiently proximate to the project. Liccardo also owns his home Downtown, which has been publicly disclosed since 2008.

Through negotiations with the city, Google ultimately agreed to purchase the public land at an elevated price, and through a public Memorandum of Understanding, Google committed to build thousands of apartments and condos, and that 25% would be rent-restricted and affordable. Google further agreed to pay millions in "commercial impact" fees for affordable housing, and when combined with other amenities and community benefits, agreed to more than $1 billion in public commitments. Google made a separate public commitment of a $1 billion revolving fund to finance affordable housing in the San Jose metro area. In May 2021, the Council unanimously approved the project.

Since the pandemic, San Jose suffered severe job losses, which disproportionately impacted low- and modest- income residents in East San Jose. In response, Liccardo partnered with several organizations, including Destination:Home, Cisco Systems, and the County of Santa Clara to launch the Silicon Valley Strong Fund to support struggling families and small businesses. Within a month, the group raised more than $20 million of private donations which the City matched with federal Cares Act dollars as well to provide local direct relief for struggling families. Nonetheless, the pandemic resulted in the loss of many small businesses. Liccardo's efforts to mitigate those devastating losses have primarily focused on "San Jose Al Fresco," an initiative to enable restaurants, retailers, and service businesses to operate safely outdoors, the facilitation of small business grants and loans through a one-stop website (SiliconValleyStrong.org), and a buy-local campaign.

=== 2018 election ===
Liccardo faced no major challengers in his reelection bid, with the Mercury News reporting ahead of the June 2018 primary election that he was "virtually guaranteed to win." Liccardo was elected to a second term of office on June 5, 2018, winning support of 76% of the voters.

=== Gun violence reduction ===
San Jose endured two mass shootings during Liccardo's tenure, including one that captured national attention in May 2021 at a transit rail yard that left ten transit workers dead. Liccardo introduced several measures to reduce gun violence, such as an ordinance to crack down on criminal organizations utilizing "straw purchasers" to buy firearms at stores to evade criminal background checks, and one to close a then-existing loophole in federal and state prohibitions on the possession and sale of ghost guns.

In 2019, Liccardo announced a first-in-the-nation initiative to require that gun owners pay annual fees to fund violence-reduction efforts, and to retain liability insurance. Liccardo explained that nothing about the ordinance would take anyone's gun away, but merely to incentivize safer gun ownership, which "could save lives in a nation where 4.6 million children live in a home where a gun is kept loaded and unlocked." It could also facilitate distribution of funds to target mental health, suicide prevention, and other services for those people at greatest risk– residents of homes in which a gun is owned, according to multiple studies. After extensive study and debate, the San Jose City Council passed the measure in 2022. Several gun rights organizations sued the City immediately.

In the following two years, a U.S. District Court and a U.S. Appellate Court upheld the ordinance against constitutional challenges. In the meantime, the initiative spurred several state legislators–such as in California and New Jersey – to introduce similar requirements of their own, often referencing San Jose's spearheading efforts.

=== Public records lawsuit ===
In 2022, Liccardo and the City of San Jose were sued for alleged failure to disclose official communications in violation of the California Public Records Act. The lawsuit was brought by non-profit news outlet San José Spotlight and the First Amendment Coalition after Liccardo denied the existence of and refused to find official communications on his personal email account in previous public records requests. On August 29, 2023, a Santa Clara County Superior Court Judge ruled against Liccardo and the city for failing to locate public records at the center of the case and further admonished the use of personal accounts to conduct official public business. The City of San Jose was ordered to pay $500,000 for the plaintiff's legal fees.

== U.S. House of Representatives ==
=== Elections ===
==== 2024 ====
In December 2023, Liccardo announced his intention to run for California's 16th congressional district, which was held by retiring incumbent Anna Eshoo. He advanced to the general election a week after finishing first in the March 2024 primary, and was expected to face Evan Low and Joe Simitian in an unusual general election after a tie for second place in the initially certified results.

Two voters in the district submitted recount requests: Jonathan Padilla, a past Liccardo campaign employee, and Dan Stegink, a former San Mateo County Supervisor candidate. A spokesperson for the Liccardo campaign said in response to the Low campaign's allegations of coordination that the campaign was unaffiliated with the recount requests. Low attempted to stop the recount by sending a letter to the Santa Clara County Registrar of Voters, but his request was denied.

A formal complaint to the Federal Election Commission was filed against Padilla and the Liccardo campaign on April 19, alleging illegal coordination between the campaign and a Super PAC as well as improper use of funds for the recount, citing a poll allegedly from Liccardo's campaign testing two-way and three-way match-ups prior to the recount requests. Liccardo released an op-ed in the San Jose Spotlight on April 29, reaffirming that "neither [he] nor anyone in [his] campaign has communicated with Padilla or his donors about the recount."

At the conclusion of the recount, in which several ballots not previously counted were deemed admissible, Simitian was ultimately eliminated and Low advanced to the general election by a 5-vote margin.

On May 20, Neighbors for Results, the super PAC supporting Liccardo almost entirely funded by billionaire Michael Bloomberg, disclosed that it paid $102,000 to the group which funded the recount, Count the Vote PAC, and local media have noted past connections between Bloomberg and Liccardo, including Bloomberg Philanthropies previously selecting San Jose, which Liccardo was then mayor of, for funding and resources in 2018, later followed by Liccardo endorsing and serving as a state co-chair of Bloomberg's presidential campaign.

=== Tenure ===
Rep. Liccardo was sworn in to the 119th Congress on January 3, 2025.

=== Committee assignments ===
For the 119th Congress:

- Committee on Financial Services
  - Subcommittee on Digital Assets, Financial Technology, and Artificial Intelligence
  - Subcommittee on National Security, Illicit Finance and International Financial Institutions
  - Subcommittee on Oversight and Investigations

=== Caucus memberships ===
- Congressional Equality Caucus
- Problem Solvers Caucus
- New Democratic Coalition
- Congressional Hispanic Caucus
- Congressional Asian Pacific American Caucus
- Congressional Ukraine Caucus

== Personal life ==
Liccardo married Jessica Garcia-Kohl in 2013. He is Roman Catholic.

Liccardo made an appearance in Episode 1 of Season 6 of the HBO series Silicon Valley.

In January 2019, Liccardo was severely injured in a bicycle accident. He was admitted to Regional Medical Center with a broken sternum and vertebrae.

== Electoral history ==
Electoral history of Sam Liccardo
Year	Office		Party	Primary			General			Result	Swing	Ref.
Year	Office		Party	Total	%	P.	Total	%	P.	Result	Swing	Ref.
2006	City Council	3rd	Nonpartisan	3,616	43.00	1st	7,883	61.30	1st	Won		
2010	City Council	3rd	Nonpartisan	6,305	80.16	1st				Won		
2014	Mayor		Nonpartisan	33,521	25.75	2nd	91,840	50.76	1st	Won		
2018	Mayor		Nonpartisan	120,846	75.84	1st				Won		
2024	U.S. House	16th	Democratic	38,492	21.13	1st	179,583	58.22	1st	Won	Hold	
2026	U.S. House	16th	Democratic	139,399	75.61	1st	TBD					
Source: Secretary of State of California | Statewide Election Results

== See also ==
- List of mayors of the 50 largest cities in the United States
- List of Hispanic and Latino Americans in the United States Congress

Political offices
Preceded by Chuck Reed	Mayor of San Jose; 2015–2023	Succeeded by Matt Mahan
U.S. House of Representatives
Preceded by Anna Eshoo	Member of the U.S. House of Representatives from California's 16th congressional district 2025–present	Incumbent
U.S. order of precedence (ceremonial)
Preceded by George Latimer	United States representatives by seniority 396th	Succeeded by Ryan Mackenzie
