= 2018 San Jose mayoral election =

- June 5, 2018
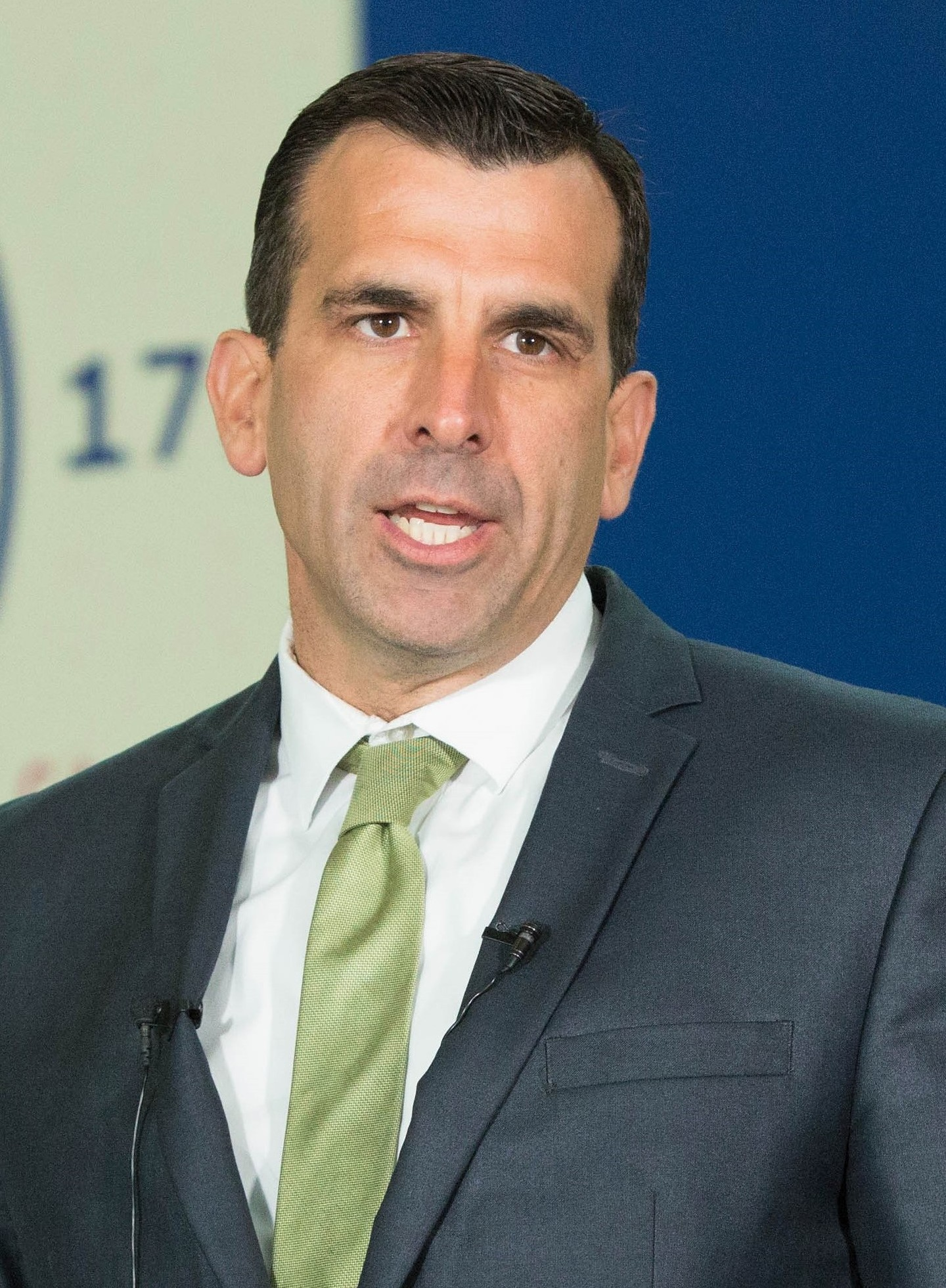

Candidate	Sam Liccardo	Steve Brown
Popular vote	120,846	22,764
Percentage	75.84%	14.29%
Candidate	Quangminh Pham	Tyrone Wade
Popular vote	11,330	4,406
Percentage	7.11%	2.8
Mayor before election
Sam Liccardo
Elected mayor
Sam Liccardo

The 2018 San Jose mayoral election was held on June 5, 2018, to elect the Mayor of San Jose, California. Since incumbent mayor Sam Liccardo received over 50% of the vote in the primary election there was no need for a run-off election in November.

Municipal elections in California are officially non-partisan.

== Results ==
Results
Candidate	Votes	%
Sam Liccardo (incumbent)	120,846	75.84
Steve Brown	22,764	14.29
Quangminh Pham	11,330	7.11
Tyrone Wade	4,406	2.77
Total votes	159,346	100.00
