= 2006 San Jose, California, mayoral election =

2006 San Jose mayoral election
- June 6, 2006 (first round); November 7, 2006 (runoff)
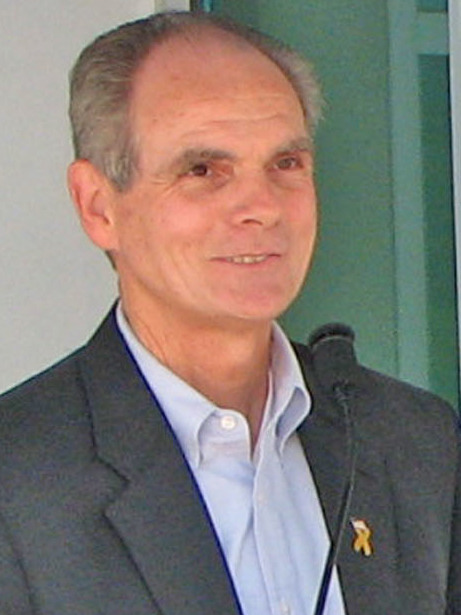

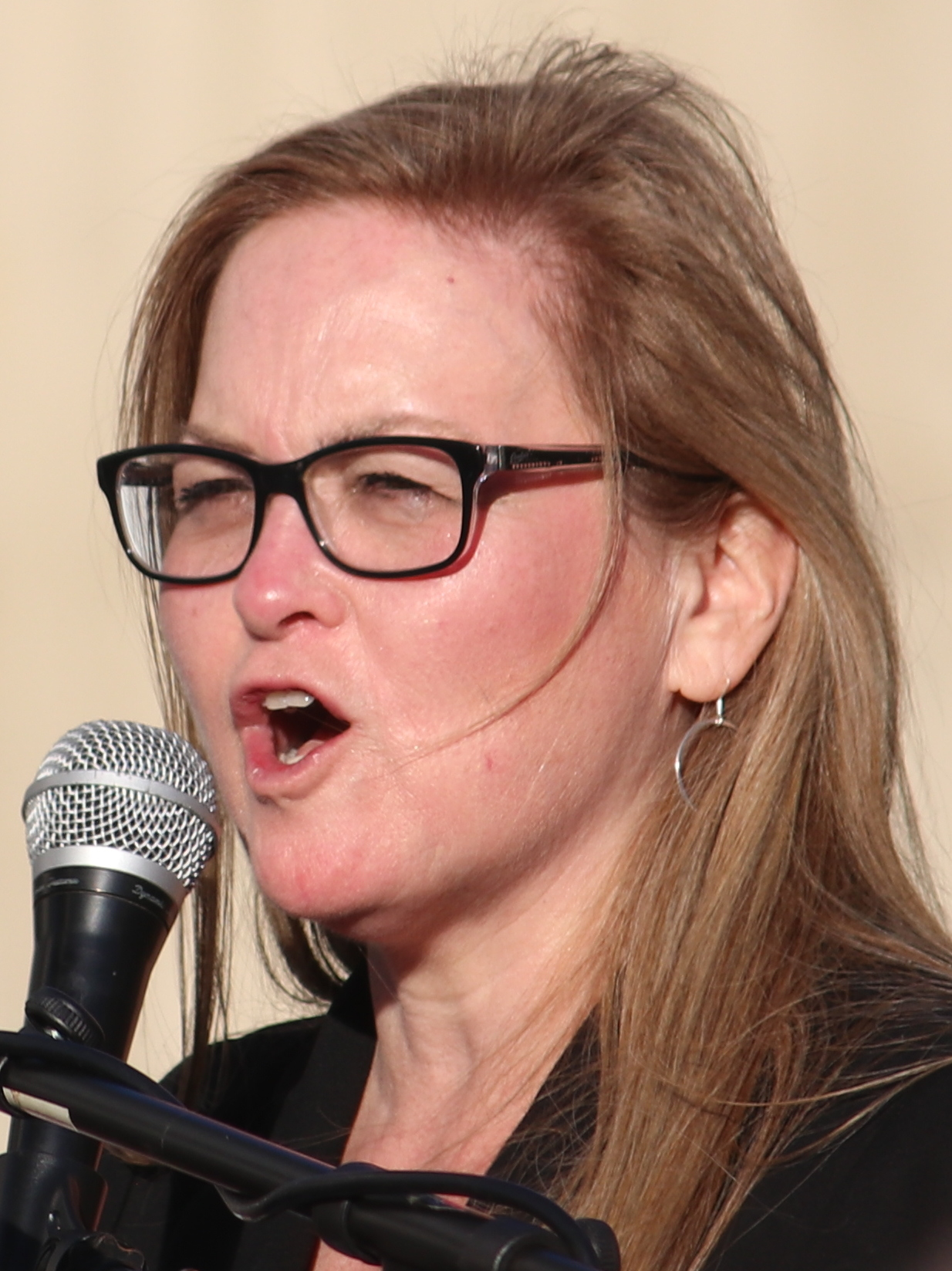

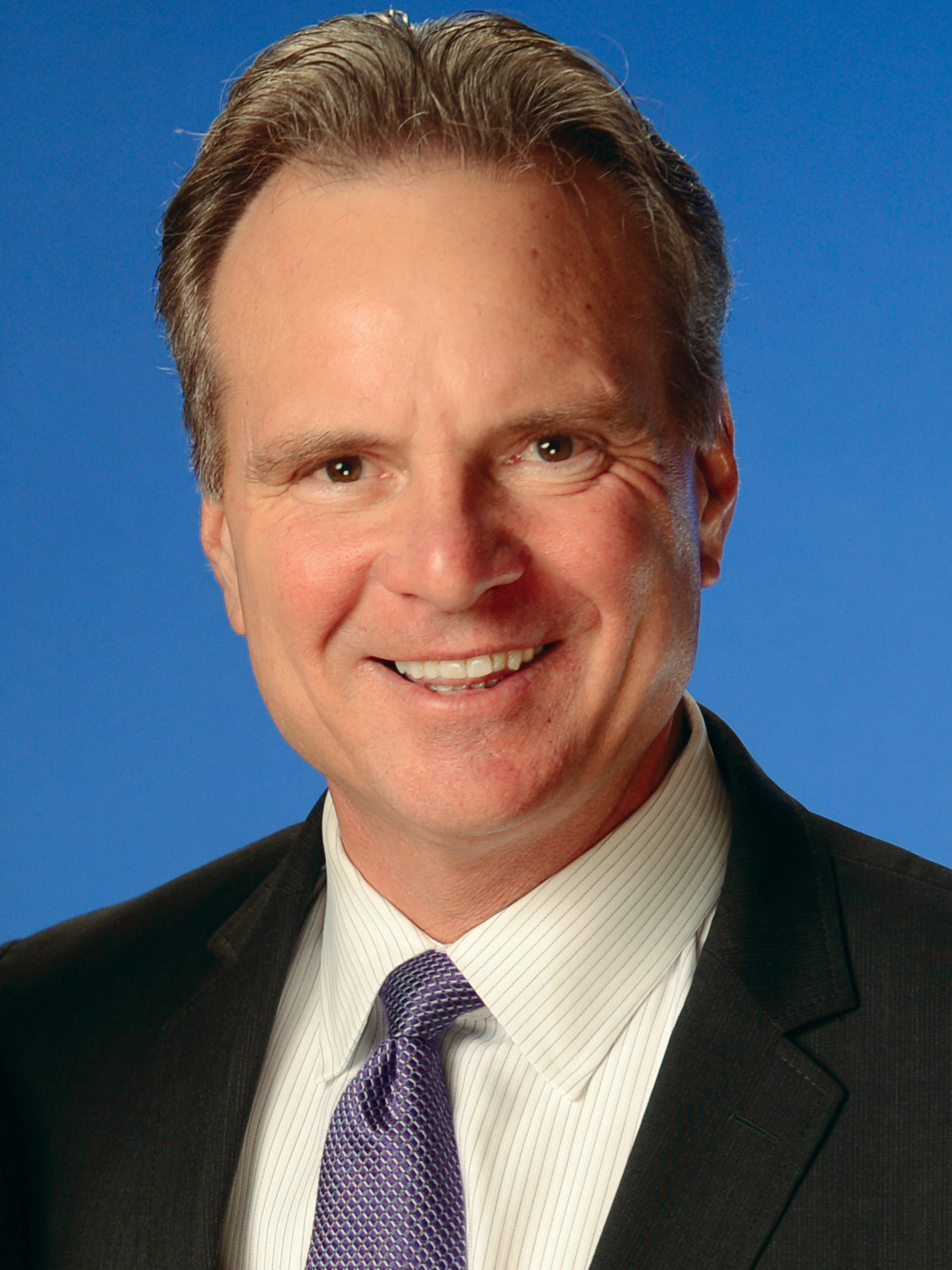

Candidate	Chuck Reed	Cindy Chavez	David Pandori
Party	Democratic	Democratic	Nonpartisan
First-round vote	36,401	29,295	22,581
First-round percentage	28.79%	23.17%	17.86%
Second-round vote	117,394	80,720
Second-round percentage	59.26%	40.74%
Candidate	David Cortese	Michael Mulcahy
Party	Democratic	Nonpartisan
First-round vote	20,691	13,580
First-round percentage	16.37%	10.74%
Mayor before election
Ron Gonzales
Democratic
Elected mayor
Chuck Reed
Democratic

The 2006 San Jose mayoral election was held on June 6 and November 7, 2006, to elect the Mayor of San Jose, California. It saw the election of Chuck Reed.

Incumbent mayor Ron Gonzales was term limited.

Because no candidate managed to receive a majority of the vote in the initial round of the election, a runoff election was held between the first round's top-two finishers.

== Candidates ==
Advanced to runoff

- Cindy Chavez, Vice mayor of San Jose since 2005 and San Jose city councilor since 1998
- Chuck Reed, San Jose. City councilor since 2000

Eliminated in first round

- John Candeias
- David Cortese, San Jose city councilor since 2000 and former member of the East Side Union High School District Board of Trustees (1992–2000)
- Timmothy K. Fitzgerald
- Larry Flores
- Michael C Macarelli
- David Pandori, deputy district attorney since 1998 and former San Jose city councilor (1991−1998)
- Jose Aurelio Hernandez
- Michael Mulcahy, realtor

== Results ==
=== First round ===
First round results
Party	Candidate	Votes	%
Democratic	Chuck Reed	36,401	28.79
Democratic	Cindy Chavez	29,295	23.17
Nonpartisan	David Pandori	22,581	17.86
Democratic	David Cortese	20,691	16.37
Nonpartisan	Michael Mulcahy	13,580	10.74
Nonpartisan	John Candeias	1,100	0.87
Nonpartisan	Timmothy K. Fitzgerald	1,032	0.82
Nonpartisan	Michael C Macarelli	654	0.52
Nonpartisan	Larry Flores	653	0.52
Nonpartisan	Jose Aurelio Hernandez	441	0.35
Total votes		126,428	100.00

Runoff results
Party	Candidate	Votes	%
Democratic	Chuck Reed	117,394	59.26
Democratic	Cindy Chavez	80,720	40.74
Total votes		198,114	100.00
