= Cindy Chavez =

American politician

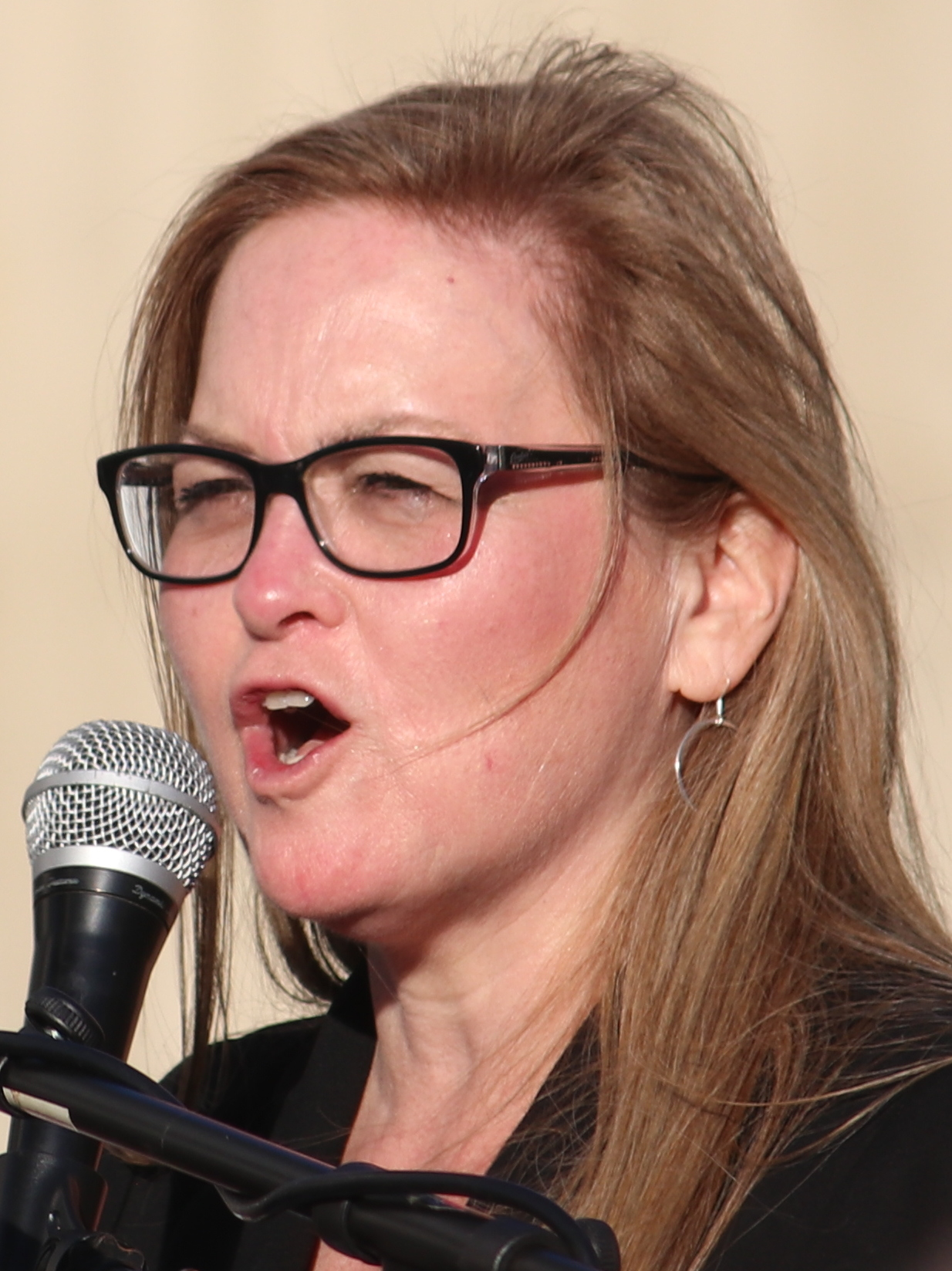

Manager of Bernalillo County
- Incumbent
- Assumed office November 13, 2024
- Preceded by: Julie Morgas Bacas

Member of the Santa Clara County Board of Supervisors from the 2nd district
- In office August 30, 2013 – November 12, 2024
- Preceded by: George Shirakawa
- Succeeded by: Betty Duong

Member of the San Jose City Council from the 3rd district
- In office January 1, 1999 – December 31, 2006
- Preceded by: David Pandori
- Succeeded by: Sam Liccardo

Personal details
- Born: April 7, 1964 (age 62) Alamogordo, New Mexico, U.S.
- Party: Democratic
- Children: 1
- Education: San Jose State University (BA)
- Website: Official website
- Other offices: 2020–2021: President of the Santa Clara County Board of Supervisors; 2005–2006: Vice Mayor of San Jose

Cindy Chavez (born April 7, 1964) is an American politician serving as the Manager of Bernalillo County, New Mexico, since 2024. She previously served on the Santa Clara County Board of Supervisors from 2013 to 2024 and on the San Jose City Council, where she was also Vice Mayor. She ran unsuccessfully for Mayor of San Jose twice, in 2006 and 2022.

== Career as Santa Clara County Supervisor ==
As a supervisor, Chavez chairs the Board's Children, Families and Seniors Committee and serves on the Finance and Government Operations Committee. She also serves as Chair of the $400 million Santa Clara Valley Transportation Authority (VTA) and is a member of the Caltrain's Peninsula Corridor Joint Powers Board Board of Directors. She is also a Director of the Bay Area Air Quality Management District.

Chavez has led efforts to create jail diversion programs for mentally ill offenders and the homeless including sobering stations, crisis stabilization beds and mobile crisis teams. She was the architect of Santa Clara County's successful $950-million dollar housing bond in the November 2016 election that will be instrumental in getting housing built for the mentally ill and homeless. Similarly, Chavez worked to develop a shelter for homeless LGBTQ youth, a large percentage of whom were kicked out of their homes.

In 2017, Chavez joined the County in filing a lawsuit against the Trump administration - Trump vs Santa Clara County - when the administration threatened to withhold federal funds affecting hospitals, social services and thousands of children, Seniors and the disabled. The administration targeted Santa Clara County for its "sanctuary city" status. A federal judge ruled in Santa Clara County's favor.

Under Chavez's leadership, the Santa Clara County Board of Supervisors approved bail reforms for low-level and non-violent offenders making Santa Clara County the first in the state of California to take action. The reforms are designed to reduce the number of people in jail and prompted the California legislature to take action.

Chavez worked to streamline and improve Santa Clara County's foster care system to include schools and improve the dually involved youth system merging child welfare with juvenile justice. Under Chavez's leadership, Santa Clara County Board of Supervisors approved $6 million to build a new resource center for foster youth (The Hub) to provide resources so they complete their education, apply to and get into college and get jobs and basic services.

Chavez was one of the two Santa Clara County Supervisors who authored the Children’s Advocacy Center proposal. The center encompasses a one-stop setting for law enforcement to investigate physical and sexual abuse of children while saving the children additional trauma of having to be transported between multiple locations while treatment, investigations and interviews are performed.

“This center is going to contribute not just to the investigations of these crimes, but also — and I’m very excited to say this — to the healing that’s so necessary when these crimes are committed,” Chavez said.

She also is taking action against human trafficking with the Santa Clara County Human Trafficking Commission she founded and co-chairs with the Santa Clara County Sheriff and District Attorney.

== Tenure on the San Jose City Council ==
Chavez was first elected to the council in 1998 and re-elected in 2002. In 2005, she was chosen by San Jose Mayor Ron Gonzales and confirmed by the council to serve as vice mayor.

As a former Downtown District Three Council Representative, Chavez chaired the Rules Committee and was on the Downtown Parking Board, Guadalupe River Park Task Force, Police and Fire Retirement Board, San Jose Beautiful and the SJ/SC Treatment Plant Advisory Committee. She sat on local and regional bodies, including the Valley Transportation Authority as vice-chair, VTA Policy Advisory Board and Nanotechnology Infrastructure and Assets Subcommittee.

== 2006 Campaign for San Jose Mayor ==
In 2006 Chavez ran for mayor in a field of ten candidates hoping to succeed termed-out Ron Gonzales. In the mayoral primary held on June 6, 2006, Chavez qualified for the two-person primary against Chuck Reed.

Chavez out-raised her opponents and was the frontrunner in polls. Chavez secured high-profile endorsements including former US President Bill Clinton, Santa Clara County Sheriff Laurie Smith, the Silicon Valley Young Democrats, Congressman Mike Honda, former San Jose mayor Susan Hammer, and former US Transportation Secretary Norman Mineta.

Ultimately, Chuck Reed led polls going into the run-off election and secured the final vote.

== Public policy community leader ==
Chavez was the director of education and outreach for the South Bay AFL-CIO Labor Council. Chavez became the executive officer of the South Bay AFL-CIO Labor Council in March 2009. The South Bay Labor Council represents ninety unions and over 100,000 union members in Santa Clara and San Benito counties. The Labor Council's stated objective is to advance candidates, causes, and policies that benefit working families. In those interests, it employs a combination of activities including community organizing, leadership training, campaigning, and issues advocacy. The Labor Council is the largest grassroots political campaign operation in the South San Francisco Bay area.

Chavez helped found and was executive director of Working Partnerships USA, a labor-aligned advocacy group. The group lobbied for the Children's Health Initiative, making Santa Clara County the first in the nation to provide health coverage to every child. They also secured passage of the San Jose Living Wage ordinance.

In early 2013, Chavez was elected as the vice-chair of the Santa Clara County Democratic Central Committee.

Chavez served for three years as budget and policy aide to then Supervisor Ron Gonzales, the first Latino Mayor of San Jose.

== 2022 Campaign for San Jose Mayor ==
Chavez finished second in the 8 November 2022 runoff, losing to councilmember Matt Mahan by 3.6 percentage points (Mah 51.8%–Chav 48.2%). While the campaigns spent similar amounts (Mahan's $1.8 million to Chavez's $1.5 million), spending by interest groups totaled approximately $3.7 million for Chavez ($885,000 for Mahan).

== Manager of Bernalillo County ==
Following her narrow defeat for San Jose Mayor in November 2022, Chavez applied unsuccessfully for a job in San Diego. Instead, it was announced on June 25, 2024, that she was selected by a 3–2 vote as a new County Manager in New Mexico. Chavez assumed the position on November 13, 2024.
