= Grant (surname) =

Grant is an English, Scottish, and French surname derived from the French graund meaning 'tall' or 'large'. It was originally a nickname given to those with remarkable size. In Scotland, it relates to Clan Grant.

== Notable people with the surname "Grant" include ==
=== A ===
- A. K. Grant (1941–2000), New Zealand writer
- Aaron Grant (1908–1966), American football player
- Abbi Grant (born 1995), Scottish footballer
- Abiola Grant (born 2002), Barbadian footballer
- Abraham P. Grant (1804–1871), American politician
- Adam Grant (born 1981), American psychologist
- Adele Gerard Lewis Grant (1881–1969), American botanist
- Adrian Grant (disambiguation), multiple people
- African Grant (born 1965), American football player
- Alan Grant (disambiguation), multiple people
- Albert Grant (disambiguation), multiple people
- Albie Grant (1943–2004), American basketball player
- Alec Grant (1893–1966), New Zealand cricketer
- Alexander Grant (disambiguation), multiple people
- Alexandra Grant (born 1973), American visual artist
- Alfred Ernest Albert Grant (1861–1933), English naval officer
- Alick Grant (1916–2008), English footballer
- Alison Grant (born 1961), New Zealand footballer
- Alistair Grant (1937–2001), British businessman
- Allean Grant (born 1983), Caymanian footballer
- Allie Grant (born 1994), American actress
- Amy Grant (born 1960), American singer-songwriter
- Amy Grant (politician), American politician
- Andrew Grant (disambiguation), multiple people
- Andy Grant (born 1984), Saint Vincentian runner
- Angela Grant (born 1950), British actress
- Ann Grant (born 1955), Zimbabwean field hockey player
- Anne Grant (1755–1838), Scottish poet
- Anthony Grant (disambiguation), multiple people
- Archibald Grant (disambiguation), multiple people
- Archie Grant (1904–1970), New Zealand railway worker
- Arthur Grant (disambiguation), multiple people
- Asahel Grant (1807–1844), American missionary
- Audrey Grant (born 1940), Canadian bridge player
- Avram Grant (born 1955), Israeli football manager

=== B ===
- Bakari Grant (born 1987), American football player
- Barbara Grant, American businesswoman
- Barra Grant (born 1948), American actress
- Beatrice Grant (1761–1845), Scottish author
- Ben Grant (disambiguation), multiple people
- Benny Grant (1908–1991), Canadian ice hockey player
- Bernard Grant (1920–2004), American actor
- Bernhard Grant (1887–1966), British philatelist
- Bernie Grant (1944–2000), British politician
- Bernie Grant (footballer) (born 1962), Scottish footballer
- Bert Grant (1878–1951), American composer
- Beryl Grant (1921–2017), Australian nurse
- Beth Grant (born 1949), American actress
- Betty Jean Grant, American politician
- Bev Grant (born 1942), American musician
- Beverly Grant (disambiguation), multiple people
- Bill Grant (disambiguation), multiple people
- Bisa Grant (born 1976), American athlete
- Blanche Grant (1874–1948), American artist
- Bob Grant (disambiguation), multiple people
- Boyd Grant (1933–2020), American basketball player and coach
- Brad Grant, Canadian trucking magnate
- Brea Grant (born 1981), American actress
- Brian Grant (disambiguation), multiple people
- Britt Grant (born 1978), American attorney
- Bruce Grant (disambiguation), multiple people
- Bryan Grant (1909–1986), American tennis player
- Buck Grant (ice hockey) (1894–1982), Canadian ice hockey player
- Bud Grant (1927–2023), American football player and coach
- Bud Grant (broadcaster) (1932–2011), American television executive
- Bunny Grant (1940–2018), Jamaican boxer

=== C ===
- Calvin A. Grant (born 1970), American ophthalmologist
- Cameron Grant (born 1970), Canadian swimmer
- Carrie Grant (born 1965), English voice coach
- Carson Grant (born 1950), American actor
- Cary Grant (1904–1986), British–American actor
- Cecil Grant (1870–1946), English academic administrator
- Chapman Grant (1887–1983), American biologist
- Charles Grant (disambiguation), multiple people
- Charlotte Grant (born 2001), Australian footballer
- Chasity Grant (born 2001), Dutch footballer
- Chet Grant (1892–1985), American football player
- Christine Grant (disambiguation), multiple people
- Christopher Grant (disambiguation), multiple people
- Ciara Grant (disambiguation), multiple people
- Cie Grant (born 1979), American football player
- Clare Grant (born 1979), American actress
- Claude H. B. Grant (1878–1958), British ornithologist
- Claudius B. Grant (1835–1921), American jurist
- Clifford Grant (1930–2021), Australian opera singer
- Clint Grant (1916–2010), American photographer
- Colesworthey Grant (1813–1880), English artist
- Colin Grant (disambiguation), multiple people
- Colquhoun Grant (disambiguation), multiple people
- Conor Grant (disambiguation), multiple people
- Coreen Grant (born 1998), Scottish rugby union footballer
- Corey Grant (born 1976), Canadian football player
- Corey Grant (running back) (born 1991), American football player
- Corinne Grant (born 1973), Australian comedian
- Cornelius Grant (born 1943), American guitarist
- Corrie Grant (1850–1924), British politician
- Craig Grant (1968–2021), American poet
- Crystal Celeste Grant (born 1980), American actress
- Cuthbert Grant (1793–1854), Canadian politician
- Cy Grant (1919–2010), Guyanese actor
- Cynthia Grant (soil scientist), Canadian scientist
- Cynthia Grant (director), Canadian theatre director

=== D ===
- Dalton Grant (born 1966), British high jumper
- Dalton Grant (rugby league) (born 1990), Welsh rugby league footballer
- Daniel Grant (disambiguation), multiple people
- Danny Grant (ice hockey) (1946–2019), Canadian ice hockey player
- Darlene Grant, American academic administrator
- Darren Grant (born 1969), American music producer
- Darren Grant (footballer) (born 1963), Australian rules footballer
- Darryl Grant (born 1959), American football player
- Davey Grant (born 1985), English mixed martial artist
- Davie Grant (1860–1903), Scottish golfer
- David Grant (disambiguation), multiple people
- Deandra Grant (born 1968), American lawyer
- Deborah Grant (born 1947), English actress
- Deborah Grant (artist) (born 1968), Canadian-American artist
- DeLawrence Grant (born 1979), American football player
- Delroy Grant (born 1957), Jamaican rapist
- Deon Grant (born 1979), American football player
- Derek Grant (disambiguation), multiple people
- Derick K. Grant (born 1973), American tap dancer
- Derrick Grant (1938–2024), Scottish rugby union footballer
- Dick Grant (1870–1956), Canadian runner
- Donald Grant (disambiguation), multiple people
- Doran Grant (born 1992), American football player
- Doris Grant (1905–2003), British nutritionist
- Dorothy Grant (born 1955), Haida fashion designer
- Doug Grant (disambiguation), multiple people
- Douglas Grant (1885–1951), Australian soldier
- Duncan Grant (1885–1978), Scottish painter
- Dwight Grant (born 1984), American mixed martial artist
- Dwinell Grant (1912–1991), American visual artist

=== E ===
- Earl Grant (musician) (1931–1970), American pianist
- Earl Grant (basketball) (born 1976), American basketball coach
- Ebenezer Grant (1882–1962), English footballer
- Eddy Grant (born 1948), Guyanese-British musician
- Edith Jacqueline Ingram Grant (1942–2020), American judge
- Edward Grant (disambiguation), multiple people
- Edwin Grant (1887–1966), American politician
- Effingham Grant (1820–1892), British businessman
- Elihu Grant (1873–1942), American scholar
- Elizabeth Grant (disambiguation), multiple people
- Emma Grant (footballer) (born 1989), Australian footballer
- Ernest Grant (American football) (born 1976), American football player
- Eugene Grant (disambiguation), multiple people
- Esme Grant, Jamaican politician
- Eva Grant (1925–2024), Greek and British figure photographer

=== F ===
- F. C. Grant (1891–1974), American scholar
- F. W. Grant (1834–1902), English scholar
- Faye Grant (born 1957), American actress
- Frances Grant, pseudonym used by the American actress and dancer Stella McCarron (1913–1982)
- Francis Grant (disambiguation), multiple people
- Frank Grant (disambiguation), multiple people
- Frederick Grant (disambiguation), multiple people

=== G ===
- Gabriel Grant (1826–1909), American doctor
- Gareth Grant (born 1980), English footballer
- Gary Grant (disambiguation), multiple people
- Gavin Grant (disambiguation), multiple people
- G. C. Grant (1866–1928), Canadian politician
- Geoffrey Grant (disambiguation), multiple people
- George Grant (disambiguation), multiple people
- Gilbert Grant (1885–1972), Canadian politician
- Glen Grant (disambiguation), multiple people
- Glendene Grant (born 1957), Canadian human rights activist
- Gogi Grant (1924–2016), American singer
- Gordon Grant (1949–1993), American actor and model
- Gordon Grant (disambiguation), multiple people
- Greg Grant (disambiguation), multiple people
- Gregor Grant (1911–1969), Scottish artist
- Guillermina Grant (born 2002), Uruguayan tennis player
- Gwen Grant (born 1940), English writer
- Gwendolyn Grant (artist) (1877–1968), Australian artist

=== H ===
- H. Roger Grant (1943/1944–2023), American historian
- Hamilton Grant (1872–1937), British diplomat
- Hannah Simpson Grant (1798–1883), American general
- Harold Grant (disambiguation), multiple people
- Harry Grant (disambiguation), multiple people
- Harvey Grant (born 1965), American basketball player
- Heathcoat Salusbury Grant (1864–1938), English naval officer
- Heber J. Grant (1856–1945), American religious leader
- Hector Grant (1924–1998), Australian cricketer
- Helen Grant (disambiguation), multiple people
- Henry Grant (disambiguation), multiple people
- Hercules Grant (born 1957), Antiguan-Canadian cricketer
- Hilda Kay Grant (1910–1996), Canadian writer
- Hope Grant (1808–1875), British Army officer
- Horace Grant (born 1965), American basketball player
- Howard Grant (disambiguation), multiple people
- Hugh Grant (born 1960), British actor
- Hugh J. Grant (1858–1910), American politician

=== I ===
- Ian Grant (disambiguation), multiple people
- Igor Grant (born 1942), American psychiatrist
- Imogen Grant (born 1996), British rower
- Ingrid Grant (born 1964), British skier
- Isabella Grant (born 2001), Australian rules footballer
- Isabelle Grant (1896–1977), American activist
- Isobel Grant, Scottish noble
- Isla Grant, Scottish singer-songwriter

=== J ===
- J. W. Grant (born 1982), American politician
- Jack Grant (disambiguation), multiple people
- Jackie Grant (1907–1978), West Indian cricketer
- Jackie Grant (footballer) (1924–1999), English footballer
- Jackson Grant (born 2002), American basketball player
- Jakeem Grant (born 1992), American football player
- James Grant (disambiguation), multiple people
- Jamie Grant (disambiguation), multiple people
- Janarion Grant (born 1993), American football player
- Jane Grant (1892–1972), American publisher
- Jarrad Grant (born 1989), Australian footballer
- Jason Grant, American music historian
- Jaydon Grant (born 1998), American football player
- Jedediah M. Grant (1816–1856), American religious figure
- Jehu Grant (1752–1840), American slave
- Jenessa Grant, Canadian actress
- Jenn Grant (born 1980), Canadian singer-songwriter
- Jennifer Grant (born 1966), American actress
- Jerai Grant (born 1989), American basketball player
- Jerami Grant (born 1994), American basketball player
- Jerian Grant (born 1992), American basketball player
- Jerome Grant, American chef
- Jerry Grant (1935–2012), American race car driver
- Jerry Grant (composer) (born 1936), American composer
- Jesse Root Grant (1794–1873), American farmer
- Jesse Root Grant (politician) (1858–1934), American politician
- Jessica Grant (born 1972), Canadian writer
- Jim Grant (disambiguation), multiple people
- Jimmy Grant (1918–1970), American baseball player
- Joan Grant (1907–1989), English author
- Joanne Grant (1930–2005), American journalist
- Job Grant (1832–1910), American politician
- Jodi Grant (born 1968), American activist
- Joe Grant (1908–2005), American artist
- John Grant (disambiguation), multiple people
- Johnny Grant (disambiguation), multiple people
- Johnson Grant (1773–1944), Scottish priest
- Jonathan Grant (born 1993), Canadian soccer player
- Jono Grant (Canadian musician) (born 1969), Canadian composer
- Jono Grant (DJ) (born 1979), British disc jockey
- Jordan Grant (field hockey) (born 1991), New Zealand field hockey player
- Jorge Grant (born 1994), English footballer
- José Luis Grant (born 1983), Honduran footballer
- Joshua Grant (disambiguation), multiple people
- Joy Grant (born 1951), Belizean politician
- Joyce Grant (1924–2006), English-South African actress
- Julia Grant (disambiguation), multiple people
- Julian Grant (born 1960), English composer
- Julie Grant (born 1946), English singer
- Julius Grant (1901–1991), British intelligence officer
- Justin Grant (born 1991), American racing driver

=== K ===
- K. M. Grant (born 1958), Scottish writer
- Kara Grant (born 1979), Canadian pentathlete
- Karl Grant (born 1970), English weightlifter
- Karla Grant, Australian journalist
- Karlan Grant (born 1997), English footballer
- Kate Grant, American activist
- Katherine Grant (disambiguation), multiple people
- Kathryn Grant (disambiguation), multiple people
- Keki Byramjee Grant (1920–2011), Indian cardiologist
- Ken Grant (born 1967), British photographer
- Kenneth Grant (disambiguation), multiple people
- Kerr Grant (1878–1967), Australian physicist
- Kerry Grant, Australian canoeist
- Keshia Grant (born 1987), New Zealand netball player
- Kevin Grant (disambiguation), multiple people
- Kilian Grant (born 1994), Spanish footballer
- Kim Grant (disambiguation), multiple people
- Kirby Grant (1911–1985), American actor
- Kristian Grant, American politician from Michigan

=== L ===
- Lachie Grant (1923–2002), New Zealand rugby union footballer
- Lachlan Grant (1871–1945), Scottish doctor
- Lady Sybil Grant (1879–1955), British writer
- Larry Grant (disambiguation), multiple people
- Laura Grant (born 2001), Scottish cricketer
- Lawrence Grant (1870–1952), English actor
- Lee Grant (disambiguation), multiple people
- Lemuel Grant (1817–1893), American engineer
- Len Grant (1906–1938), American football player
- Leroy Grant (1889–1951), American football player
- Levi Grant (1810–1891), American politician
- Lewis Grant (disambiguation), multiple people
- Lex Grant (born 1962), Scottish footballer
- Lilias Grant (??–1643/1644), Scottish writer
- Linda Grant (born 1951), British journalist
- Lindsay Grant (born 1964), Kittitian politician
- Lindsay Grant (businessperson) (1899–1989), Trinidadian businessman
- Lindy Grant (born 1952), British professor
- Linn Grant (born 1999), Swedish golfer
- Liz Grant (1930–2023), Australian pharmacist
- Lou Grant (cartoonist) (1919–2001), American cartoonist
- Lourett Russell Grant, American musician
- Lyonel Grant (born 1957), New Zealand sculptor

=== M ===
- M. Donald Grant (1904–1998), American sports executive
- Maddy Grant (born 2001), Canadian rugby union footballer
- Madison Grant (1865–1937), American lawyer
- Magdalena Grant (born 1987), Chilean journalist
- Malcolm Grant (disambiguation), multiple people
- Marcel Grant (born 1961), British filmmaker
- Margaret Grant (disambiguation), multiple people
- Maria Grant (1854–1937), Canadian activist
- Marianne Grant (1921–2007), Czech-Scottish artist
- Mark Grant (disambiguation), multiple people
- Marshall Grant (1928–2011), American bassist
- Mary Grant (disambiguation), multiple people
- Mavis Grant (born 1948), British teacher
- McKenzie Grant (1834–1897), Australian politician
- Megan Grant, American softball player
- Melissa Gira Grant (born 1978), American journalist
- Michael Grant (disambiguation), multiple people
- Michel Grant (born 1958), Swedish judoka
- Mick Grant (born 1944), English motorcycle racer
- Micki Grant (1941–2021), American singer
- Mike Grant (1873–1955), Canadian ice hockey player
- Moray Grant (1917–1977), Scottish cinematographer
- Moses Grant Jr. (1785–1861), American businessman
- Mudcat Grant (1935–2021), American baseball player
- Murdoch Grant (??–1830), Scottish salesman

=== N ===
- Nancy Grant, French-Canadian film producer
- Natalie Grant (born 1971), American singer
- Neil Grant (disambiguation), multiple people
- Nellie Grant (1855–1922), American social figure
- Nicky Grant (born 1976), Scottish footballer
- Norman Grant (disambiguation), multiple people

=== O ===
- Olga Grant, Canadian baseball player
- Oliver Grant (disambiguation), multiple people
- Orantes Grant (born 1978), American football player
- Otis Grant (born 1967), Canadian boxer
- Otis Grant (American football) (1961–2011), American football player

=== P ===
- Paa Grant (1878–1956), Australian merchant
- Pablo Grant (1997–2024), German rapper
- Pamela Grant (born 1982), Australian footballer
- Patrick Grant (disambiguation), multiple people
- Paul Grant (disambiguation), multiple people
- Percy Grant (disambiguation), multiple people
- Perry Grant (1924–2004), American producer
- Peter Grant (disambiguation), multiple people

=== Q ===
- Qua Grant (born 1999), American basketball player

=== R ===
- Rachel Grant (born 1977), Filipino actress
- Ray Grant (born 1996), Scottish footballer
- Ray Grant (curler) (1934–2020), Canadian curler
- Rebecca Grant (born 1982), English actress and singer
- Reg Grant (1914–1944), New Zealand pilot
- Reg Grant (footballer) (1932–1979), Australian rules footballer
- Rhoda Grant (born 1963), Scottish politician
- Rhyan Grant (born 1991), Australian footballer
- Rhys Grant (born 1987), Australian rower
- Richard Grant (disambiguation), multiple people
- Richie Grant (disambiguation), multiple people
- Riley Grant (born 1995), American soccer player
- Robert Grant (disambiguation), multiple people
- Roddy Grant (disambiguation), multiple people
- Rodney A. Grant (born 1959), American actor
- Rolph Grant (1909–1977), West Indian cricketer
- Rodgers Grant (1936–2012), American pianist
- Roger Grant (disambiguation), multiple people
- Ronald Grant (disambiguation), multiple people
- Rosey Grant, British meteorologist
- Rosie Grant (1908–1974), American football player
- Ruby Grant (born 2002), English footballer
- Rupert Grant (born 1973), American football player
- Russell Grant (born 1951), British astrologer
- Ruth Tunstall Grant (1945–2017), American artist
- Ryan Grant (disambiguation), multiple people
- Rylend Grant, American screenwriter

=== S ===
- Saginaw Grant (1936–2021), American actor
- Sam Grant (born 1995), English cricketer
- Samuel Grant (1741–1808), Jamaican slave hunter
- Sandy Grant, Australian Anglican minister
- Sarah D. Grant (1943–2016), American judge
- Schuyler Grant (born 1970), American actress
- Scott Grant (born 1944), British Army officer
- Seth Grant, Australian neuroscientist
- Shalita Grant (born 1988), American actress
- Shannon Grant (born 1977), Australian rules footballer
- Shauna Grant (1963–1984), American model
- Shauntay Grant, Canadian author
- Shelby Grant (1936–2011), American actress
- Stan Grant (disambiguation), multiple people
- Stanley Grant (1902–1993), British cinematographer
- Stephen Grant (disambiguation), multiple people
- Steven Grant (born 1953), American writer
- Susan Grant, American novelist
- Susan-Mary Grant (born 1962), American historian
- Susannah Grant (born 1963), American screenwriter
- Suzanne Grant (born 1984), Scottish footballer

=== T ===
- T. J. Grant (born 1984), Canadian mixed martial artist
- Taryn Grant (born 1994), Canadian water skier
- Ted Grant (1913–2006), South African politician
- Terry Grant (disambiguation), multiple people
- Theo Grant (born 2000), Canadian football player
- Thomas Grant (disambiguation), multiple people
- Tiffany Grant (born 1968), American voice actor
- Timothy Grant (disambiguation), multiple people
- Tobie Grant (1887–1968), American philanthropist
- Tom Grant (disambiguation), multiple people
- Toni Grant (1942–2016), American psychologist
- Tony Grant (disambiguation), multiple people
- Travis Grant (born 1950), American basketball player
- Trevor Grant (disambiguation), multiple people
- Troy Grant (born 1970), Australian politician
- Trudy Grant, Canadian entertainment executive
- Tylan Grant (born 2002), English actor
- Tyra Grant (born 1988), American basketball player
- Tyrone Grant (born 1977), American basketball player
- Tzufit Grant (born 1964), Israeli actress

=== U ===
- Ulysses S. Grant (disambiguation), multiple people

=== V ===
- Valentine Grant (1881–1949), American actress
- Valentino Grant (born 1964), Italian politician
- Vanessa Grant, Canadian writer
- Verne Grant (1917–2007), American botanist
- Vernon Simeon Plemion Grant (1902–1990), American illustrator
- Victoria Grant (born 1982), New Zealand rugby union footballer
- Virginia Grant (1937–2017), Canadian swimmer

=== W ===
- W. V. Grant (born 1946), American televangelist
- Waldo Grant (1946–2023), American serial killer
- Walter Grant (disambiguation), multiple people
- Wes Grant (born 1946), American football player
- Wilf Grant (1920–1990), English footballer
- Will Grant (born 1954), American football player
- William Grant (disambiguation), multiple people
- William-Pierre Grant (1872–1943), Canadian politician
- Willis Grant (1907–1981), English organist
- Wylie Grant (1879–1968), American tennis player

=== Z ===
- Zilpha Grant (1919–2011), English swimmer

== Fictional characters ==
- Dr. Alan Grant, a character in the film Jurassic Park
- Alby Grant, a character on the television series Big Love
- Athena Grant, a character on the television series 9-1-1
- Barry Grant, a character on the soap opera Brookside
- Cat Grant, a character in DC Comics
- Damon Grant, a character on the soap opera Brookside
- Ellen Grant, the main character in the 1949 American comedy movie Miss Grant Takes Richmond
- Eli Grant, a character on the soap opera Days of Our Lives
- Ginger Grant, a character on the television series Gilligan's Island
- Glory Grant, a character in Marvel Comics
- Jo Grant, a character on television series Doctor Who
- Karen Grant, a character on the soap opera Brookside
- Lou Grant, a character on the television series The Mary Tyler Moore Show
- Nancy Grant (All My Children), a character on the soap opera All My Children
- Nicolette Grant, a character on the television series Big Love
- Sheila Grant, a character on the soap opera Brookside
- Ted Grant, a character in DC Comics
- Valerie Grant, a character on the soap opera Days of Our Lives

== See also ==
- Grant (given name), a page for people with the given name "Grant"
- Grant (disambiguation), a disambiguation page for "Grant"
- Admiral Grant (disambiguation), a disambiguation page for admirals surnamed "Grant"
- General Grant (disambiguation), a disambiguation page for generals surnamed "Grant"
- Governor Grant (disambiguation), a disambiguation page for governors surnamed "Grant"
- Judge Grant (disambiguation), a disambiguation page for judges surnamed "Grant"
- Justice Grant (disambiguation), a disambiguation page for Jjustices surnamed "Grant"
- President Grant (disambiguation), a disambiguation page for presidents surnamed "Grant"
- Senator Grant (disambiguation), a disambiguation page for senators surnamed "Grant"
