= Elizabeth Murray =

Elizabeth Murray may refer to:

- Elizabeth Murray, Countess of Dysart in her own right and Duchess of Lauderdale by marriage (1626–1698), British noblewoman
- Elizabeth Murray Bourne, Australian conservationist
- Elizabeth Murray Campbell Smith Inman (1726–1785), shopkeeper, teacher, philanthropist
- Elizabeth Murray (songwriter) (1745?–1814?), Scottish songwriter, married name Murray
- Lady Elizabeth Murray (1760–1825), British aristocrat, daughter of the 2nd Earl of Mansfield
- Elizabeth Murray (painter) (1815–1882), English painter and author
- Elizabeth Leigh Murray (1815–1892), English actress
- Elizabeth Murray (artist) (1940–2007), American artist
- Elizabeth Murray (doctor) (1960–2023), British medical practitioner and academic
- Elizabeth Dunbar Murray (1877–1966) American author and educator
- Liz Murray (born 1980), American inspirational speaker
- Elizabeth Carey (social activist) (1835–1920), married name Murray, Canadian co-founder of the Halifax Infants' Home and activist for the prevention of cruelty to animals
- Elizabeth Reid Murray (1925–2014), American historian and preservationist
- Liz Murray (born 1980), American memoirist and inspirational speaker

== See also ==
- Elisabeth Murray (1909–1998), English biographer and educationist
- Bessie I. Murray, member of the Massachusetts House of Representatives
