= Elizabeth Grant =

Elizabeth Grant may refer to:

- Elizabeth Grant (songwriter) (1745?–1814?), Scottish songwriter
- Elizabeth Grant (health researcher), Scottish academic
- Liz Grant (1930–2023), Australian pharmacist and politician
- Beth Grant (born 1949), American actress
- Elizabeth Grant (anthropologist) (1963–2022), Australian architect and anthropologist
- Lana Del Rey (born 1985), American singer, born Elizabeth Woolridge Grant
- Elizabeth Grant (diarist) (1797–1885), British diarist
- Elizabeth Grant (Miss England 2016) (born 1996), British beauty pageant titleholder
