= Duncan Grant (disambiguation) =

Duncan Grant was a British painter and designer.

Duncan Grant may also refer to:

- Duncan Grant (rower) (born 1980), New Zealand rower
- Sir Duncan Grant, 13th Baronet, of the Grant baronets

== See also ==
- Grant (name)
