= Roger Grant =

Roger Grant may refer to:

- Roger Grant (oculist) (died 1724), English quack oculist
- Roger Mathew Grant, theorist of music
- H. Roger Grant, American railroad historian and author
- Roger Grant (EastEnders)
- Roger Grant (American football), Utah State running back
