= Mary Grant =

Mary Grant may refer to:

- Mary Grant Price (1917–2002), American costume designer
- Mary Grant (politician) (1928–2016), Ghanaian politician
- Mary Grant (sculptor) (1831–1908), British sculptor
- Mary A. Grant (1890-1987), American classical scholar
- Mary K. Grant (1902–1975), American industrial designer
- Mary E. Grant (born 1953), American psychiatric nurse and politician
- Mary Pollock Grant (1876–1957), Scottish suffragette, politician, missionary and policewoman
- Mary Grant (archer) (born 1949), Canadian former archer
- Mary Goodell Grant (1857–1941), American socialite and first lady of Colorado
- Maria Rosetti (1819–1893), née Marie Grant, Guernsey-born Wallachian and Romanian political activist, journalist, essayist, philanthropist, and socialite
- Mary Seacole (1805–1881), née Mary Grant, Jamaican-born woman of Scottish and Creole descent who set up a 'British Hotel' behind the lines during the Crimean War
- Liz Grant (Mary Elizabeth Grant, 1930–2023), Australian pharmacist and politician
- Mary Grant in Jules Verne novel In Search of the Castaways

== See also ==
- Mary Grant Bruce (1878–1958), Australian children's author and journalist
- Mary Grant Carmichael (1851–1935), English composer
- Mary Grant Roberts (1841–1921), Australian zoo owner
