= Katherine Grant =

Katherine Grant may refer to:

- Katherine Grant (actress) (1904–1937), American actress
- Katherine Grant, 12th Countess of Dysart (1918–2011), Scottish politician
- Katherine Whyte Grant (1845–1928), Scottish writer

== See also ==
- Kathryn Grant (disambiguation), a disambiguation page for people named "Kathryn Grant"
