= Ben Grant =

Ben Grant may refer to:

- Ben Grant (film producer), Australian film producer
- Ben Grant (rugby union) (born 1998), Australian rugby union player
- Ben Z. Grant (born 1939), Texas state legislator and judge
- Benjamin Grant (born 1970), Sierra Leonean sprinter

== See also ==
- Benny Grant (1908–1991), Canadian ice hockey goalie
