= Christopher Grant =

Christopher or Chris Grant may refer to:

- Christopher Grant (cricketer) (1935–2017), English cricketer
- Christopher Grant, editor of the video game website Polygon
- Chris Grant (footballer) (born 1972), Australian rules footballer
- Chris Grant (basketball) (born 1972), basketball executive
- Chris Grant (media executive), American media executive
