= Gordon Grant =

Gordon Grant may refer to:

- Gordon Grant (artist) (1875–1962), American artist
- Gordon Grant (actor) (1949–1993), American actor and model
- Gordon K. Grant (1908–1940), American artist
- Gordon Burton Grant (1911–2001), politician in Saskatchewan, Canada
