= Derek Grant =

Derek Grant may refer to:

- Derek Grant (drummer) (born 1977), former drummer for punk band Alkaline Trio
- Derek Grant (footballer) (born 1966), Scottish professional footballer
- Derek Grant (ice hockey, born 1974), retired Canadian ice hockey player
- Derek Grant (ice hockey, born 1990), Canadian ice hockey player
- Derick K. Grant (born 1973), American tap dancer and choreographer
- Derrick Grant (1938–2024), Scottish rugby player
