= Greg Grant =

Greg Grant may refer to:

- Greg Grant (basketball, born 1960) (born 1960), American basketball player
- Greg Grant (basketball, born 1966) (born 1966), American basketball player

== See also ==
- Gregor Grant (1911–1969), Scottish artist
