= Senator Grant =

Senator Grant may refer to:

- Bill Grant (Florida politician) (born 1943), Florida State Senate
- Edwin Grant (1887–1966), California State Senate
- John Grant (Florida politician) (born 1943), Florida State Senate
- Johnny Grant (politician), Georgia State Senate
- Levi Grant (1810–1891), Wisconsin State Senate
- Norman Grant (politician), Senate of Jamaica
- Robert Y. Grant (1819–1862), New York State Senate
