= Justice Grant =

Justice Grant or Judge Grant, may refer to:

- Britt Grant (born 1978), justice of the Georgia Supreme Court
- Claudius B. Grant (1835–1921), chief justice of the Michigan Supreme Court
- John T. Grant (judge) (1920–2010), associate justice of the Nebraska Supreme Court
- William Grant, Lord Grant (1909–1972), Lord Justice Clerk of Scotland

== See also ==
- Judge Grant (disambiguation)
- Grant (surname)
