= Frank Grant =

Frank Grant may refer to:

- Frank Grant (baseball), 19th century African-American baseball player
- Frank Grant (American football), American football player
- Frank Grant (boxer), former British boxer
- Frank Grant (All My Children), soap opera character

== See also ==
- Frank Grant Sawyer, American politician and governor of Nevada
- Frank Gant, a jazz drummer
- Francis Grant (disambiguation)
