= Norman Grant =

Norman Grant may refer to:

- Norman Grant, musician and lead singer of The Twinkle Brothers
- Norman Grant (cricketer) (1891-1966), Australian cricketer
- Norman Grant (politician), Jamaican politician
