= Mhoira Leng =

International palliative care specialist

Mhoira Leng FRSE
- Born: 1963 (age 62–63)
- Education: University of Aberdeen
- Occupation: Palliative care specialist
- Known for: International development of palliative care

Mhoira E.H. Leng (born 1963) FRSE FRCPE is one of the first Scottish specialists in palliative care. She has developed palliative care services internationally, working in Eastern Europe, India and Africa and advises international institutions and agencies on palliative care in the developing world. In 2021, Leng was admitted as a Fellow of the Royal Society of Edinburgh.

== Qualifications and early career ==
Leng studied medicine at the University of Aberdeen, graduating with MB ChB in 1987. She became a Member of the Royal College of Physicians in 1990, a Fellow of the Royal College of Physicians (Glasgow) in 1999, and Fellow of the Royal College of Physicians (Edinburgh) in 2001. Leng was employed for ten years in the NHS Scotland in North East Scotland as senior consultant, an honorary senior lecturer at the University of Aberdeen and as a clinical lead in palliative care developments. Leng then went on to work full-time to develop palliative care internationally.

== International collaboration ==
Leng works with the global health Usher Institute at the University of Edinburgh and Makarere University, Kampala, Uganda as an associate faculty member. Since 2010, she has been a mentor to the international palliative care leadership initiative at the Institute for Palliative Medicine, San Diego Hospice, San Diego California. She was one of the founders and is the medical director of Cairdeas International Palliative Care Trust, a registered charity based in Scotland. Leng is a board member of the International Association for Hospice and Palliative Care and advisor to the Mehac Foundation, India.

Leng has worked with the Christian Medical College, Vellore India and the Emmanuel Hospitals Association, as well as since1998, in developing the palliative care models with the Makarere University and Mulago Hospital, Kampala, Uganda.

Leng and Liz Grant's comparative work in defining palliative care for chronic conditions was cited in the World Health Organisation's 2004 Global Atlas of Palliative Care.

Her personal care for dying patients in Uganda is recognised by families and in the Aberdeen press she was quoted as saying:

"Listening and supporting what is important to that person and family even when time is short."

Leng was admitted as a Fellow of the Royal Society of Edinburgh in 2021.

== Selected publications ==
- 2020 Pain workshop ESMO: Africa (Response)
- 2020 Health-related quality of life, palliative care needs and 12-month survival among patients with end stage renal disease in Uganda: protocol for a mixed methods longitudinal study
- 2020 "From good hearted community members we get volunteers" – an exploratory study of palliative care volunteers across Africa
- 2018 Joint position statement Indian Association of Palliative Care and Academy of Family Physicians of India – The way forward for developing community-based palliative care program throughout India: Policy, education, and service delivery considerations
- 2017 Integrating palliative care into national health systems in Africa: a multi–country intervention study
- 2017 'I think my body has become addicted to those tablets'. Chronic heart failure patients' understanding of and beliefs about their illness and its treatment: A qualitative longitudinal study from Uganda
- 2016 A palliative care link nurse programme in Mulago Hospital, Uganda: an evaluation using mixed methods
- 2011 Review Article: Cancer Pain Management in Resource-Limited Settings: A Practice Review
- 2011 Palliative care making a difference in rural Uganda, Kenya and Malawi: three rapid evaluation field studies
- 2008 Interventions for the treatment of metastatic extradural spinal cord compression in adults
- 2007 Africans die in pain because of fears of opiate addiction
- 2001 Retrospective study of the use of hydromorphone in palliative care patients with normal and abnormal urea and creatinine
