= Donald Grant (disambiguation) =

Donald Grant (1888–1970) was as Australian politician.

Donald Grant may also refer to:

- Bud Grant (broadcaster) (B. Donald Grant, 1932–2011), American television executive
- Donald M. Grant (1927–2009), American publisher
- Donald Grant, English-language broadcaster for Nazi Germany
- Donald Grant of Grant, 5th Baron Strathspey (1912–1992), of the Barons Strathspey
- M. Donald Grant (1904–1988), American baseball club owner
- Donald Grant (rugby union) (1892–1962), Scottish rugby union player
- Donald Grant (South African politician), South African businessman and politician
- Donald Grant (surveyor) (born 1934), Australian surveyor
- Donald M. Grant, Publisher, a fantasy and science fiction small press publisher

== See also ==
- Donald Creighton (Donald Grant Creighton, 1902–1979), Canadian historian
- Donald Grant Devine (born 1944), Canadian politician, premier of Saskatchewan
- Donald Duffy (Donald Grant Duffy, 1915–1995), Australian doctor
- Donald Grant McLeod (born 1959), former field hockey player from New Zealand
- Donald Grant Millard (died 1964), American pilot, was shot down in East Germany during 1964 T-39 shootdown incident
- Donald Grant Mitchell (1822–1908), American essayist and novelist
- Donald Grant Nutter (1915–1962), American politician, governor of Montana
- Donald Thomas (American football) (Donald Grant Thomas, born 1985), American football player
