= Governor Grant =

Governor Grant may refer to:

- Alexander Grant (British Army officer) (1775–1827), Acting Governor of Sierra Leone in 1820 and 1821
- Henry Grant (British Army officer) (1848–1919), Governor of Malta from 1907 to 1909
- James Grant (British Army officer, born 1720) (1720–1806), Governor of East Florida from 1763 to 1771
- John Peter Grant (1807–1893), Governor of Jamaica from 1866 to 1874
- Lewis Grant (colonial administrator) (1777–1852), Governor of the Bahamas from 1821 to 1829 and Governor of Trinidad from 1829 to 1833
- Patrick Grant (Indian Army officer) (1804–1895), Governor of Malta from 1867 to 1872
- Robert Grant (MP) (1779–1838), Governor of Bombay from 1835 to 1838
