= Maude Carey =

Falklander postmaster

Maude Carey ISO
- First woman postmaster in the British Empire and also the first woman in the Islands to hold a driving licence.
- Born: July 24, 1888; Stanley, Falkland Islands
- Died: August 8, 1950 (aged 62); Port Stanley, Falkland Islands, United Kingdom
- Occupation: Colonial Postmaster
- Parents: Charles Carey (father); Ellen Elizabeth Carey (mother)
- Relatives: 10 other siblings

Ellen Maude Carey ISO (1888 – 8 August 1950) was the Colonial Postmaster of the Falkland Islands from 1 January 1934. She is thought to have been the first woman postmaster in the British Empire. She was also the first woman in the Islands to hold a driving licence.

== Early life ==
Ellen Maude Carey was born in 1888, one of eleven children of Charles Carey and Ellen Elizabeth Carey, née Rudd. Charles Carey was a former Royal Marine who became chief of police in the Falklands.

== Career ==
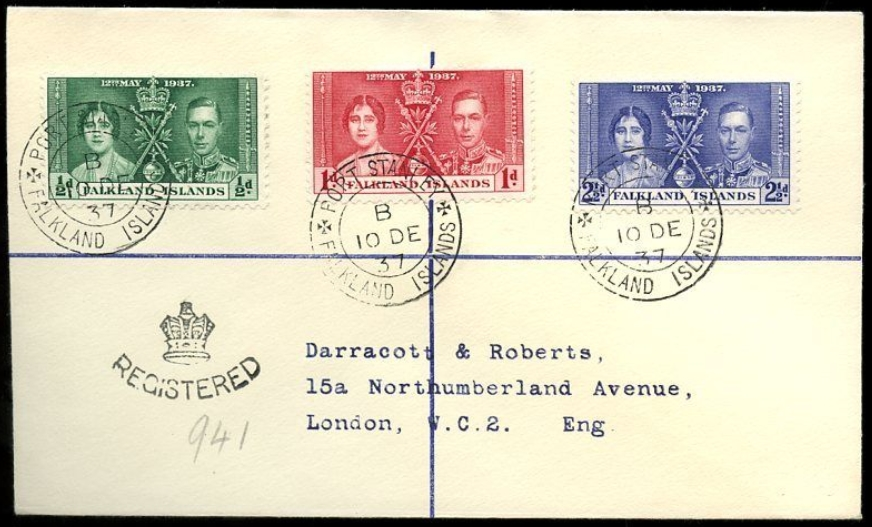
A Falkland Islands 1937 coronation stamps first day cover, typical of the 1000s required to be prepared by Maude Carey and her staff for stamp dealers and collectors.

In 1903, Carey became a teacher when just 15 years old. At age 32 she became a clerk in the Falklands Post Office, becoming postmaster on 1 January 1934. In 1935, she was presented with a Silver Jubilee Medal by King George V in Government Paddock and in 1943 she was awarded the Imperial Service Order for colonial service.

Carey built up warm relations with overseas philatelists who it was her responsibility to supply with the popular stamps of the Falkland Islands. First day covers of the 1937 coronation stamps proved a particular challenge for her and her small staff with at least 16,000 registered covers required to be prepared and dispatched within a short period of time. In correspondence with the philatelist Captain Bernhard Grant, Carey complained that first day covers were "an infernal nuisance and ought to be burned", saying that she had "such a lot of worry - the doctor almost made a fuss & ordered me not to work. However, I pegged on with my usual driving spirit and managed it fairly well." She continues, however, by promising to obtain more philatelic material for Grant.

On 16 April 1944, a fire at Port Stanley Town Hall destroyed the post office and Peter Robertson, a relative of Maude Carey who witnessed the fire with her, believes that the event greatly affected Carey's health. She retired due to ill health around 1947.

== Personal life ==
Carey seems to have been fairly well off. She was the first woman in the Falkland Islands to own a driving licence and commented in correspondence with Bernhard Grant in 1937, "My car is running smoothly & I am getting heaps of fun with it. I been in the ditch more than once but not damaged anyone or the car. The roads are narrow for turning." In the same letter, she says, "my grand piano is a beauty but is left idle". She lived at Harbour View in Port Stanley. The house still exists as of early 2015. As far as is known, Carey never married and left no issue.

== Death ==
Carey died at Harbour View on 8 August 1950. She is buried in the Port Stanley cemetery, sharing a gravestone with her brother Raymond Falkland Carey.
