= Percy Grant =

Percy Grant is the name of:

- Percy Grant (Royal Navy officer) (1887-1952), Royal Navy admiral and Chief of Navy of the Royal Australian Navy
- Percy Stickney Grant (1860–1927), American Protestant Episcopalian clergyman
