= Archibald Grant =

Archibald Grant may refer to:

- Sir Archibald Grant, 2nd Baronet (1696–1778), MP for Aberdeenshire 1722–1732
- Sir Archibald Grant, 3rd Baronet (1731–1796), of the Grant baronets
- Sir Archibald Grant, 4th Baronet (1760–1820), of the Grant baronets
- Sir Archibald Grant, 7th Baronet (1823–1884), of the Grant baronets
- Sir Archibald Grant, 13th Baronet (born 1954), of the Grant baronets
- Arch Grant (1911–2005) a Presbyterian minister, Army chaplain and historian
- Archie Grant (Archibald Brewster Grant, 1904–1970), New Zealand railway worker and trade unionist
