= Admiral Grant =

Admiral Grant may refer to:

- Albert W. Grant (1856–1930), U.S. Navy admiral
- Harold Taylor Wood Grant (1899–1965), Royal Canadian Navy vice admiral
- John Grant (Royal Navy officer) (1908–1996), British Royal Navy rear admiral
- Percy Grant (Royal Navy officer) (1867–1952), British Royal Navy admiral
- William Lowther Grant (1864–1929), British Royal Navy admiral
