= Walter Grant =

Walter Grant may refer to:

- Walter Grant (Scottish footballer), Scottish football midfielder
- Walter Grant (footballer, born 1884) (1884–1961), English football inside forward
- Walter Colquhoun Grant (1822–1861), British Army officer and settler in British Columbia.
- W. V. Grant (Walter Vinson Grant Jr., born 1945), televangelist
- Walter S. Grant (1878–1956), officer in the United States Army
