= Nedd =

Coordinates: 58.23638°N 5.17541°W

Nedd: Scottish Gaelic: An Nead
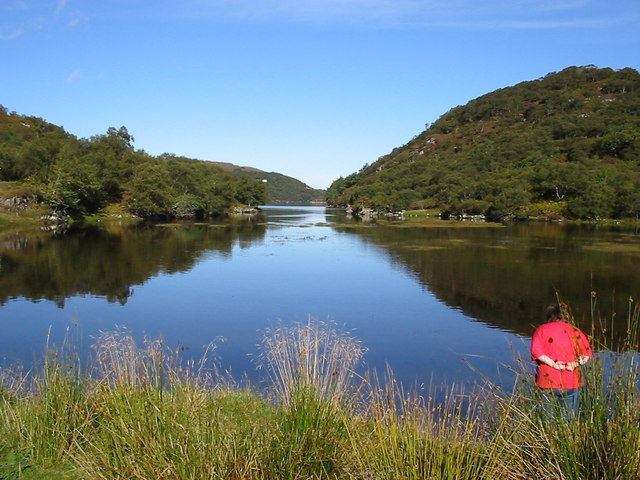
- High tide at Nedd

- Location within the Sutherland area
- OS grid reference: NC136319
- Council area: Highland
- Lieutenancy area: Sutherland
- Country: Scotland
- Sovereign state: United Kingdom
- Post town: Lairg
- Postcode district: IV27 4
- Police: Scotland
- Fire: Scottish
- Ambulance: Scottish

Nedd (Scottish Gaelic: An Nead) is a small village, which lies on the western head of Loch Nedd in Lairg, western Sutherland, Scottish Highlands and is in the Scottish council area of Highland.

The village of Drumbeg lies less than 1 mile north west along the B869 road.

Murdoch Grant, a famous victim of murder, was killed close to Nedd. The financier John Stewart was born in Nedd.
