= Edward Grant (disambiguation) =

Edward Grant (1926–2020) was an American historian of medieval science.

Edward, Eddie or Ted Grant, or similar names may also refer to:

== Sports ==
- Edward Grant (cricketer) (1874–1953), English cricketer
- Eddie Grant (baseball) (1883–1918), American baseball player killed in World War I
- Eddie Grant (footballer) (1928–1979), Scottish footballer
- Eddie Grant (rugby union) (born 1946), Ireland rugby union international from Northern Ireland

== Others ==
- Edward Grant (headmaster) (1540s–1601), English classical scholar, poet and headmaster
- Ted Grant (1913–2006), South African politician
- Eddy Grant (born 1948), Guyanese-born musician and record producer
- Wildcat (Ted Grant), a DC Comics superhero

== See also ==
- Edwin Grant, American politician in the California legislature
