= Andrew Grant =

Andrew Grant may refer to:

- Andrew Grant (writer) (born 1968), British novelist
- Andrew Grant (politician) (1830–1924), Scottish Liberal politician
- Andrew Grant (physician), physician and writer
- Andrew Grant (volleyball) (born 1985), Australian volleyball player
- Andrew Grant (minister), Scottish minister
- Andy Grant (born 1984), middle-distance runner from Saint Vincent and the Grenadines
- Andrew Grant (landscape architect), British landscape architect, most notable for designing Singapore's Gardens by the Bay.
