= Albert Grant =

Albert Grant may refer to:

- Albert W. Grant (1856–1930), admiral of the US Navy during World War I
  - USS Albert W. Grant
- Albert Grant (company promoter) (1831–1899), Irish-born British company promoter
- Albie Grant (1943–2004), American basketball player
