= Francis William Grant =

Francis William Grant may refer to:

- Francis Ogilvie-Grant, 6th Earl of Seafield (1778–1853), Scottish politician, member of parliament for Elginshire and other constituencies
- Francis William Grant (1814–1840), Scottish politician, member of parliament for Inverness-shire, son of the 6th Earl

== See also ==
- Francis Grant (disambiguation)
