= Lewis Grant =

Lewis Grant may refer to:

- Lewis Grant (colonial administrator), British colonial administrator
- Lewis A. Grant, American general

== See also ==
- Lewis (Ludovick) Grant-Ogilvy, 5th Earl of Seafield
