= Daniel Grant =

Daniel Grant may refer to:

- Daniel Grant (politician) (1826–?), English Member of Parliament for Marylebone
- Daniel Grant (arts journalist), American journalist and author of career guides for artists
- Danny Grant (ice hockey) (1946–2019), Canadian hockey player
- Danny Grant (footballer) (born 1999), Irish association football player
- Dan Grant, American consultant
