= Christine Grant =

Christine Grant may refer to:

- Christine Grant (administrator), American academic administrator
- Christine Grant (alpine skier) (born 1962), New Zealand alpine skier
- Christine Grant (scientist), American chemical engineer
