= Julia Grant (disambiguation) =

Julia Grant (1826–1902), was the wife of U.S. President Ulysses S. Grant.

Julia Grant may also refer to:

- Julia M. Grant (1873–1944), philanthropist and widow of New York City mayor Hugh J. Grant
- Julia Grant Cantacuzène (1876–1975), born Julia Dent Grant, author and historian
- Julia Grant (transgender activist) (1954–2019), British activist and author
