= Glen Grant =

Glen Grant may refer to:

- Glen Grant (historian) (1947–2003), Hawaiian historian, author and folklorist
- Glen Grant distillery, single malt Scotch distillery
- Glen Grant, lieutenant colonel, British military expert
