= Johnson Grant =

Scottish priest

Johnson Grant (1773–1844) was a Scottish priest of the Church of England. He was alleged to be an evangelical early in his ministry, but his mature written works lampooned evangelicals in vitriolic fashion and modern scholarship views Grant as a High churchman.

== Life ==
He was born at Edinburgh, the son of Dr Gregory Grant and Mary, daughter of Sir Archibald Grant of Monymusk (son of Francis Grant, Lord Cullen). He matriculated at St John's College, Oxford, on 21 October 1795, and took his degree of BA in 1799, and MA in 1805.

Ordained in the Church of England by Henry Majendie, Grant became curate to Edward Owen. He was in succession at Ormskirk, Lancashire, Frodsham and Latchford in Cheshire, where he succeeded James Glazebrook as perpetual curate at the Chapel of Ease in 1803.

In 1809 Grant moved to London, as curate of Hornsey, and then of and St Pancras. in Middlesex. Through the interest of Majendie, he was presented to the living of Binbrooke St. Mary, Lincolnshire, in 1818, and to the incumbency of Kentish Town, London, in 1822, where he remained till his death on 4 December 1844. The Jesuit priest Ignatius Grant (originally 'Johnson Grant': 1820–1904), much involved in the 'Oxford Movement', was his son.

== Works ==
Grant wrote, in addition to occasional sermons and pamphlets:

1. 'A Manual of Religious Knowledge,’ 1800, 2nd ed. 1805, 3rd ed. 1809.
2. 'Reverie considered as connected with Literature,’ 1802 (in 'Memoirs' of Manchester Literary and Philosophical Society).
3. 'A Summary of the History of the English Church,’ 1811–26, 4 vols.
4. 'Sermons,’ 1812.
5. 'Sacred Hours.'
6. 'Arabia, a Poem,’ 1815.
7. 'God is Love, freely translated from Eckartshausen,’ 1817.
8. 'The Crucifixion, a Series of Lent Lectures,’ 1821.
9. 'A Memoir of Miss Frances Augusta Bell,’ 1827.
10. 'The Last Things. a Series of Lent Lectures,’ 1828.
11. 'Six Lectures on Liberality and Expediency,’ 1830.
12. 'A Course of Lectures for the Year,’ 1833–1835, 2 vols.
13. 'The Joshuad, a Poem,’ anonymous, 1837.
14. 'Sketches in Divinity,' 1840.
15. 'Discourses, &c.,’ 1843.
