= Margaret Grant =

Margaret Grant may refer to:

- Margaret Macpherson Grant (1834–1877), Scottish heiress and philanthropist
- Margaret Grant (boccia), Irish boccia player
- One of the many pseudonyms of John R. Coryell, American dime novelist
- A pen name used by William Brown Meloney V and Rose Franken when they wrote together
