= Gavin Grant =

Gavin Grant may refer to:

- Gavin Grant (editor), science fiction editor and writer
- Gavin Grant (executive) (born 1955), chief executive of the RSPCA
- Gavin Grant (footballer) (born 1984), English footballer
