= Howard Grant =

Howard Grant may refer to:

- Howard Grant (boxer) (born 1966), Canadian boxer
- Howard Grant (jockey) (1930s–2018), American Thoroughbred horse racing jockey
- Howard P. Grant, African American civil engineer
