= Hercules Grant =

Antiguan-born Canadian cricketer (born 1957)

Personal information
- Full name: Hercules Grant
- Born: 30 May 1957 (age 69); Piggotts, Saint George Parish, Antigua
- Batting: Right-handed
- Bowling: Right-arm fast-medium

International information
- National side: Canada

Domestic team information
- Years: Team
- 1978: Suffolk

Career statistics
| Competition | List A |
|---|---|
| Matches | 1 |
| Runs scored | 15 |
| Batting average | 15.00 |
| 100s/50s | –/– |
| Top score | 15 |
| Balls bowled | 72 |
| Wickets | 1 |
| Bowling average | 41.00 |
| 5 wickets in innings | – |
| 10 wickets in match | – |
| Best bowling | 1/41 |
| Catches/stumpings | –/– |
- Source: CricketArchive, 11 July 2011

Hercules Grant (born 30 May 1957) is an Antiguan-born Canadian cricketer. During his cricket career, he was a right-handed batsman who bowled right-arm fast-medium.

Grant was born in Piggotts, Saint George Parish, Antigua. He played non first-class matches for Antigua in 1976, in that same year he played for the Leeward Islands Under-19s. He played in England in 1978, making his debut for Suffolk in his only List A appearance against Sussex in the Gillette. In this match, he scored 15 runs before being dismissed by Imran Khan, while with the ball he took the wicket of Kepler Wessels for the cost of 41 runs from 12 overs. In that same season he made 2 Minor Counties Championship appearances against Hertfordshire and Buckinghamshire. He later moved to Canada, where he played 2 matches for the Canada national cricket team, both against the United States in 1987 and 1991.

He attended the University of Alberta, receiving a BScPT in 1984 and a MEd in 1993. Grant holds a Ph.D. in rehabilitation medicine, also from the University of Alberta.
