= Doug Grant =

Doug Grant may refer to:

- Doug Grant (footballer) (born 1938), Scottish footballer
- Doug Grant (ice hockey) (born 1948), Canadian ice hockey player

== See also ==
- Douglas Grant (1885–1951), Australian soldier
