= Helen Grant =

Helen Grant may refer to:

- Helen Grant (field hockey) (born 1979), England women's field hockey player
- Helen Grant (politician) (born 1961), British Member of Parliament
- Helen Grant (author) British author of Gothic novels
- Helen Grant (Holby City), character from the UK television series Holby City, played by Susannah York

== See also ==
- Maria Grant (Helen Maria Grant; 1843–1907), Canadian women's rights activist and politician
- The Helen Grant Books, series of novels by US author Amanda Minnie Douglas (1831–1916)
