= Christopher Grant (cricketer) =

English cricketer

Personal information
- Full name: Christopher Robert Wellesley Grant
- Born: 19 December 1935; Lincoln, Lincolnshire, England
- Died: 22 October 2017 (aged 81); Newark-on-Trent, Nottinghamshire, England
- Batting: Left-handed

Domestic team information
- Years: Team
- 1968: Nottinghamshire

Career statistics
| Competition | First-class | List A |
|---|---|---|
| Matches | 3 | 1 |
| Runs scored | 125 | 2 |
| Batting average | 20.83 | – |
| 100s/50s | –/– | –/– |
| Top score | 48 | 2* |
| Balls bowled | – | – |
| Wickets | – | – |
| Bowling average | – | – |
| 5 wickets in innings | – | – |
| 10 wickets in match | – | – |
| Best bowling | – | – |
| Catches/stumpings | –/– | –/– |
- Source: Cricinfo, 3 May 2014

Christopher Robert Wellesley Grant (19 December 1935 – 22 October 2017) was an English cricketer active in the late 1960s. Born at Lincoln, Lincolnshire, Grant was a left-handed batsman. He died at Newark-on-Trent, Nottinghamshire.

Grant made his debut in first-class cricket for Nottinghamshire against Derbyshire in the 1968 County Championship, with him making two further first-class appearances in 1968 against the touring Australians and Sussex. He scored 125 runs in his three matches, top-scoring with 48. He also made a single appearance in List A cricket in 1968, against Worcestershire in the Gillette Cup.
