= Derek Grant (footballer) =

Scottish footballer

Personal information
- Date of birth: 19 May 1966 (age 60)
- Place of birth: Edinburgh, Scotland
- Position: Defender

Senior career*
Years	Team	Apps	(Gls)
1985-1988	Cowdenbeath	81	(9)
1988-1990	Airdrieonians	79	(4)
1990-1992	Meadowbank Thistle	77	(4)
1992-1996	Montrose	118	(27)
1996-1997	Berwick Rangers	22	(1)
- Bo'ness United
- * Club domestic league appearances and goals

Derek Grant (born 19 May 1966) is a Scottish professional footballer who played as a defender for Meadowbank Thistle.

== Club career ==
Grant started his career at Cowdenbeath. He made 81 appearances for the Blue Brazil between 1985 and 1988.

His good form earned him a £35,000 move to Airdrieonians in 1988. He spent 3 years with the Diamonds and turned out 79 times in the league for the North Lanarkshire club.

The defender signed for Meadowbank Thistle in 1990 where he made 77 league appearances over the next two years.

He was on the move again in 1992, this time signing for Montrose. He made 118 appearances for the Gable Endies, including a stunning winner in a 1-0 Scottish Challenge Cup quarter final tie against Stirling Albion.

Grant signed for Berwick Rangers in 1996. It would prove to be his final stint in the Scottish Football League. After one season at the Borderers, he left the club and moved into the Lowland Football League with Bo'ness United.
