= Trevor Grant =

Trevor Grant may refer to:

- Trevor Grant (cricketer), English cricketer
- Trevor Grant (footballer), Australian rules footballer
- Trevor Ogilvie-Grant, 4th Baron Strathspey, English baron
