= Roger Grant (oculist) =

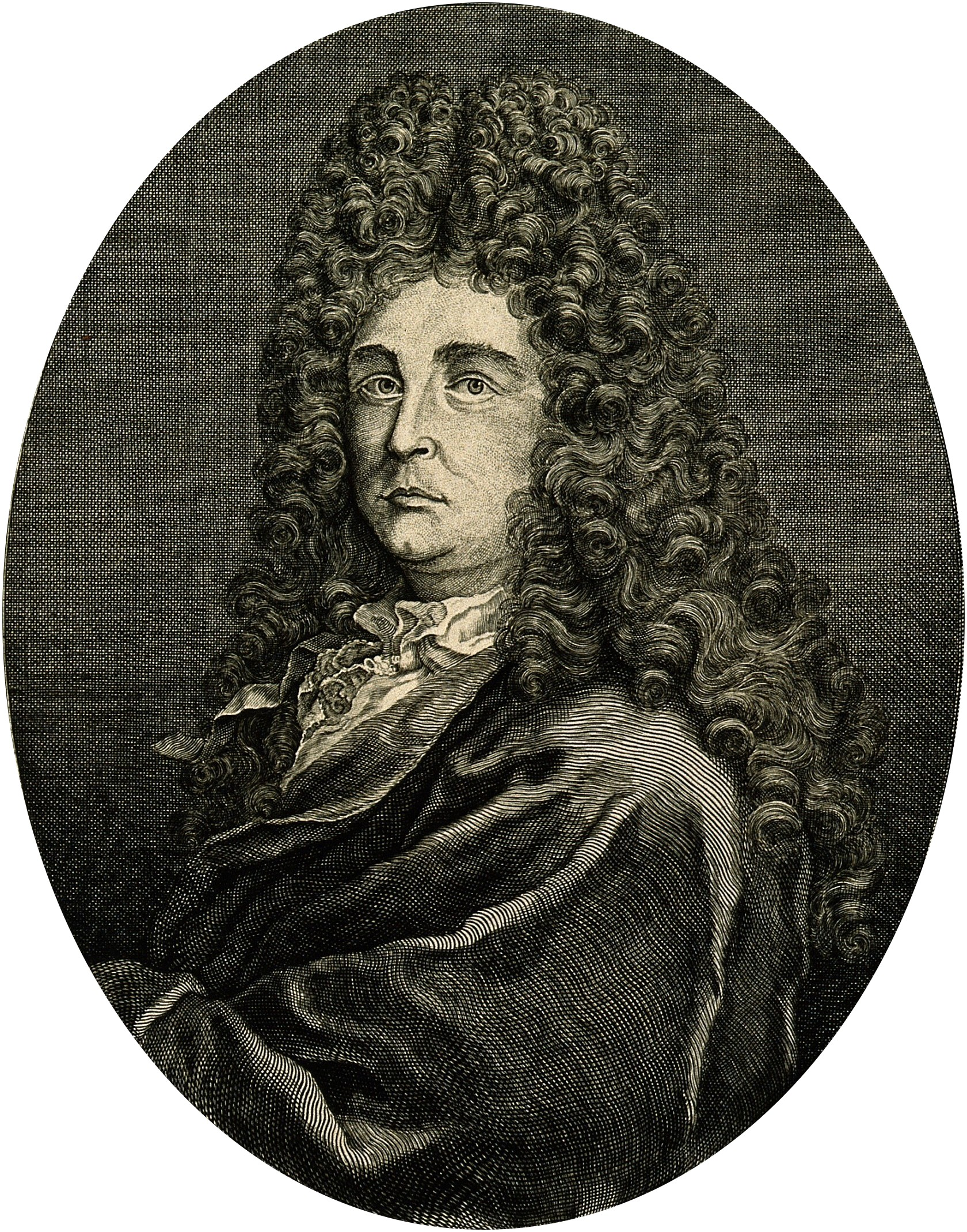
Roger Grant

Roger Grant (died 7 April 1724) was an unqualified English quack oculist.

Grant, having lost an eye as a soldier in the German emperor's service, set up as an oculist in Queen Anne's reign in Mouse Alley, Wapping. He was appointed oculist to Anne and to George I, and acquired considerable wealth.

He is satirically referred to as 'putting out eyes with great success' in No. 444 of The Spectator (30 July 1712). A sheet describing his professed cures is in the British Museum Library, and also an Account of a Miraculous Cure of a Young Man in Newington, London, 1709, written to discredit his pretensions. The pamphlet states that Grant was a Baptist preacher, had been a cobbler, and was illiterate.
