= Colin Grant =

Colin Grant may refer to:

- Colin Grant (author) (born 1961), British author of Jamaican origin
- Colin Grant (bishop) (1832–1889), Scottish clergyman, Roman Catholic Bishop of Aberdeen, 1889
- Colin Grant (footballer) (born 1944), Scottish footballer
- Colin Grant (musician), Canadian fiddler; former member of Còig
