= Ben Z. Grant =

American politician, judge, author, and playwright

Benjamin Zane Grant (born 25 October 1939) is a former Texas state legislator and judge. He is also an author and playwright.

== Law career ==
Grant graduated from Panola College in Carthage, Texas and Northwestern State University in Natchitoches, Louisiana. He received a Doctor of Jurisprudence degree from the University of Texas School of Law in 1968, and was admitted to the State Bar of Texas later that year. During law school, Grant worked for the General Land Office and Veterans Land Board, taught night school at Austin High School, and worked as an aide for Representative Cread L. Ray.

After Ray decided not to seek reelection in 1970, Grant ran in his place and represented District Three in the Texas House of Representatives from January 12, 1971 to January 8, 1981. During his first term, the 62nd Legislature, Grant became a member of the "Dirty Thirty," a group of representatives who "grouped against... [several state] officials charged in a bribery-conspiracy investigation by the United States Securities and Exchange Commission." Grant served nine years as Chairman of the Texas House Judiciary Committee.

Grant did not seek re-election to the House in 1981; he successfully campaigned for the judgeship of the Seventy-First Judicial District Court in Marshall. Shortly after Grant's reelection to the 71st Court in 1984, Governor Mark White appointed him to the Sixth Court of Appeals in Texarkana. Grant served for seventeen years on the Court of Appeals from 1985 to 2003, retiring with the status of senior judge.

Grant sought the Democratic nomination for Texas Lieutenant Governor in 2006.

Grant has formerly served as president of the Northeast Texas Bar Association and the State Bar Judicial Section Executive Committee. He also served six years as president of the Texas Judicial Council.

== Literary career ==
Grant has authored several books: The Last Dragon, a children's book; and two novels, The Wolf Has No Pillow and Troubles Walk North. He has also written or co-written numerous plays, including The Kingfish, a play about the life of Huey P. Long, which was co-authored with Larry L. King. The play is published by the Southern Methodist University Press. His other plays are Came The Cajuns, From Hardscrabble, a two-act play set in rural East Texas, Evangeline's Song, The Sage of the Sabine – the Strife and Times of Isaac Van Zandt, and Roarin', Rantin' Rabbie.

Grant wrote a weekly column, "The History Around Us," for the Marshall News Messenger, beginning in 1998.

== Family ==
Grant has two children; his daughter Brea is an actress and director, and his son Zane is involved in film and TV production.
