= Ian Grant =

Ian Grant may refer to:

- Ian Lyall Grant (1915–2020), British army officer, engineer and government official
- Ian Grant (physicist) (1930–2025), British physicist
- Ian F. Grant (born 1940), New Zealand historian, writer, editor and publisher
- Ian Grant (businessman) (1943–2022), chairman and First Commissioner of the Crown Estate

== See also ==
- Iain Hamilton Grant (born 1963), British philosopher
