= Adrian Grant =

Adrian Grant may refer to:

- Adrian Grant (cricketer) (born 1961), Barbadian cricketer
- Adrian Grant (squash player) (born 1980), British professional squash player
- Adrian Grant (writer and producer), British writer and producer
