= Roddy Grant =

Roddy Grant may refer to:

- Roddy Grant (footballer) (born 1966), English-born Scottish former professional footballer
- Roddy Grant (rugby union) (born 1987), rugby union player with Edinburgh and Scotland sevens
