= Paul Grant =

Paul Grant may refer to:

- Paul Grant (actor) (1966–2023), British actor
- Paul Grant (basketball) (born 1974), American basketball player
- Paul Grant (bodybuilder) (1943–2003), British bodybuilder
- Paul Grant (Days of Our Lives), a television character
- Paul Grant (footballer) (born 1993), Scottish footballer
- Paul Grant (guitarist), member of 3 Colours Red rock band
- Paul K. Grant, chair of the Libertarian National Committee (1983–1985)
- Paul Grant (physicist) (1935–2023), American/Irish physicist and science writer
- Paul Grant (rugby union) (born 1987), New Zealand rugby union player
- Paul Grant Rogers (1921–2008), American lawyer and politician
