= F. W. Grant =

- Born: 25 July 1834; Putney, England
- Died: 25 July 1902 (aged 68); Plainfield, New Jersey
- Notable work: The Numerical Bible
- Religion: Christian
- Theological work
- Era: Mid 19th Century
- Language: English
- Tradition or movement: Brethren
- Notable ideas: Structural and numerical form of Scripture; Emphasized the two majestic revelations of God: Nature and Scripture

Frederick William Grant (1834–1902) was a Brethren biblical scholar, renowned for his studies in the structural and numerical form and content.

== Biography ==
F. W. Grant was born on 25 July 1834 in the Putney area of London. Educated at King's College School, London in the hope of eventual employment in the British War Office, when this course failed, he emigrated to Canada, initially joining and being ordained into the Anglican Church there. He moved again to the US and New York, finding a final home in New Jersey. He became associated with a group of exclusive brethren which eventually became known as the Grant fellowship.

He published numerous books based on his scriptural studies and in 1880 "Help and Food" a monthly magazine was launched and edited by Grant until his death.

He died in Plainfield, New Jersey on the 25th July 1902 which coincidentally was his 68 birthday. An Obituary in Help and Food (September 1902) records F. W. Grant's death on Friday, July 25, 1902, and his burial "on Lord’s Day, his sixty-eight birthday." Though technically the magazine was incorrect as his burial on Sunday was two days after his birthday.

== Works ==
- Ought We To Be Watching? a reply to Mr. Laing's tract on the "Second coming of the Lord. Toronto: ?s.n. 1877.
- Facts and theories as to a future state: the Scripture doctrine considered with reference to current denials of eternal punishment. New York: M. Cathcart, Toronto: S.W. Hallows. 1879. ISBN 9780665897948.
- The Numerical Bible: being a revised translation of the Holy Scriptures with expository notes, arranged, divided, and briefly characterized according to the principles of their numerical structure. New York: Loizeaux Bros. 1882. [1890-1904]

Vol. 1: Genesis to Deuteronomy
Vol. 2: Joshua to 2 Samuel
Vol. 3: Psalms
Vol. 4: Ezekiel
Vol. 5: Matthew to John
Vol. 6: Acts to 2 Corinthians
Vol. 7: Hebrews to Revelation

- A Letter Relating to the Division at Montreal. New York: ?. 1885.
- The Numerical Structure of Scripture; a seal upon its perfect inspiration, and a divinely given help to its right interpretation. New York: Loizeaux Bros. 1887.
- The Mysteries of the Kingdom of Heaven. New York: Loizeaux Bros. 1889.
- Genesis in the Light of the New Testament. New York: Loizeaux Bros. 1900.
- Man and the Future State; a Scriptural refutation of universalism, restorationism and annihilationism. Treasury of truth, no. 139. New York: Loizeaux Bros. 1924.
- God's Evangel; being gospel papers. New York: Loizeaux Bros. 1926.
- A Divine Movement: and our path with God to-day. New York: Loizeaux Bros.
- Leaves From the Book
- Atonement: In Type, Prophecy, and Accomplishment
- The Crowned Christ
- Lessons of the Ages
- The Prophetic History of the Church
- Spiritual Law in the Natural World
- Lessons from Exodus
- Deliverance
- Peter's Conversion
- The Two Natures
- The Sovereignty of God in Salvation
- Nicolaitanism: The Rise and Growth of the Clergy

== Bibliography ==
- Reid, John (1995). F.W. Grant: His life, ministry and legacy. Emmaus Bible College.
