= Terry Grant =

Terry Grant may refer to:

- Terry Grant (gridiron football) (born 1987), American former football player
- Terry Grant (stunt driver) (born 1963), British stunt driver
- Terry Grant, tracker featured in Canadian reality television series Mantracker
