= Bernhard Grant =

British philatelist

Bernhard Shirley Henniker Grant (19 November 1887 – 4 March 1966) was a British philatelist who signed the Roll of Distinguished Philatelists in 1940.

Grant was born in Boughton Monchelsea, Kent, to William Shirley Petman Grant and Edith Margaretta Catherine Grant. He had an award-winning collection of stamps of the Falkland Islands and of Iceland Experimental Airmails 1930–50.

He died in Maidstone in 1966.

== Selected publications ==
- The Postage Stamps of the Falkland Islands & Dependencies Stanley Gibbons, 1952.

== See also ==
- Maude Carey, Postmaster of the Falkland Islands
