= Elizabeth Dunbar Murray =

American historian

- Born: October 25, 1877; Natchez, Mississippi, US
- Died: May 19, 1966 (aged 88); Natchez, Mississippi, US
- Occupation(s): author and educator

Elizabeth Dunbar Murray (25 October 1877 – 19 May 1966) of Natchez, Mississippi, was an author, director, impersonator, and conducted the Murray School of Expression.

== Early life and education ==
Murray was the eldest daughter of William Forman and Mary Conway Shields Dunbar, born at her parents' home "Birdsnest" in Natchez, Mississippi. She was the granddaughter of Judge Joseph Dunbar Shields, the author of The Life and Times of S.S. Prentiss. She was the grand-niece of the historian Colonel J.F.H. Claiborne. Elizabeth Dunbar married Alexander Murray (of Canada) on 16 April 1901.

She graduated from the Natchez Female College and the Boston School of Expression. She taught at both schools as well. As an author, she wrote books about Natchez local history: Early Romances of Historic Natchez and My Mother Used to Say: A Natchez Belle of the Sixties.

== Career ==
Murray was an advocate for the prosperity of Natchez through the presentation of historical accounts and pageantry. She served as President of the Dramatic Club in Natchez. She was a member of Natchez community organizations and authored letters to the editor of the Natchez Democrat, empowering women of Natchez and creating social impact prior to women's right to vote.

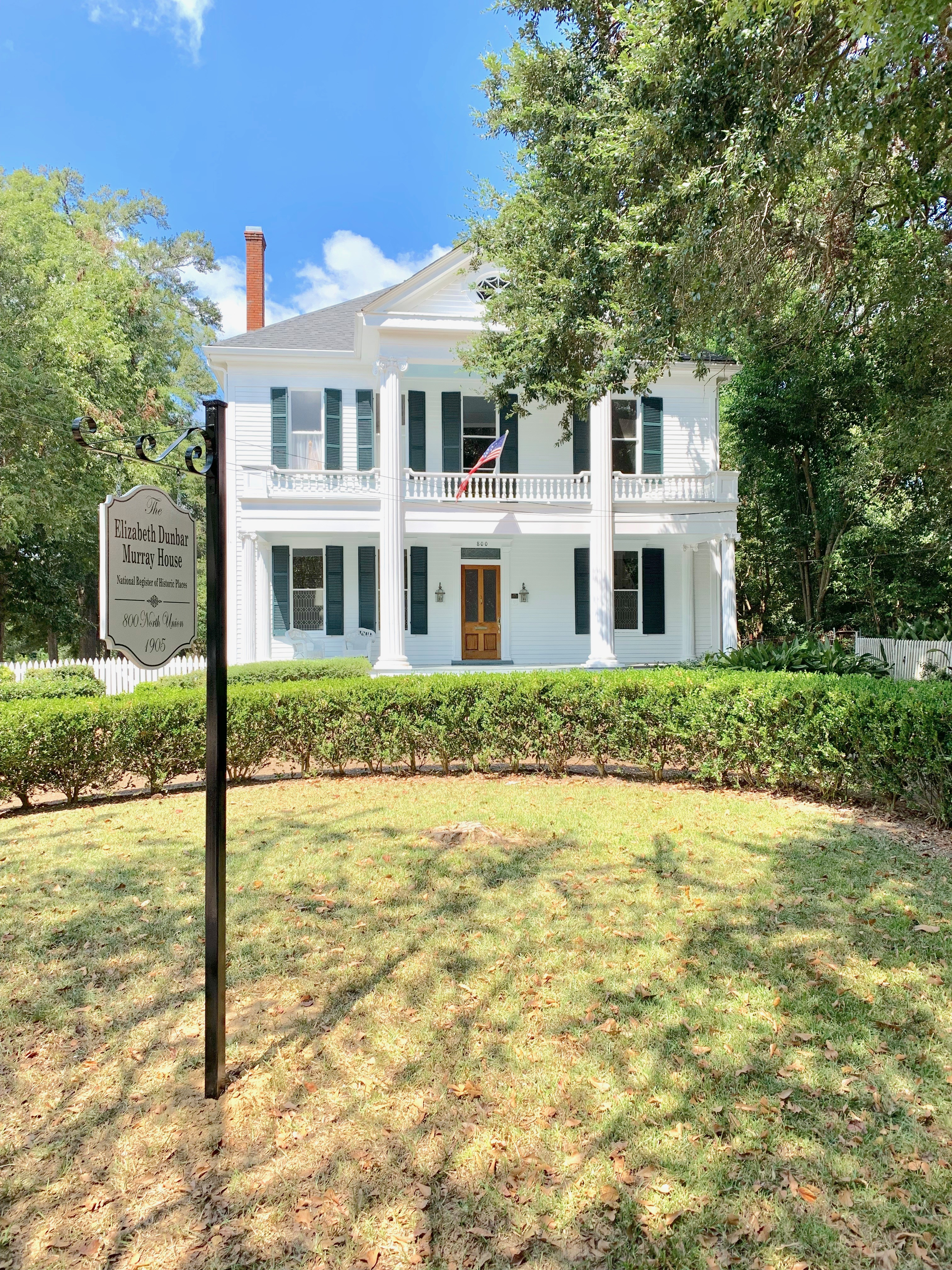
The Elizabeth Dunbar Murray House

Murray directed the first play presented at the opening of Memorial Hall in Natchez on 18 April 1922. She had a residence studio for her pupils in expression at her home, located at 800 North Union Street. The home was built for Murray 1906 (estimated date) and is located in the Upriver Residential District, which is on the National Register of Historic Places. Murray lived in the home until her death in 1966. She conducted the Murray School of Expression for forty five years at her home.

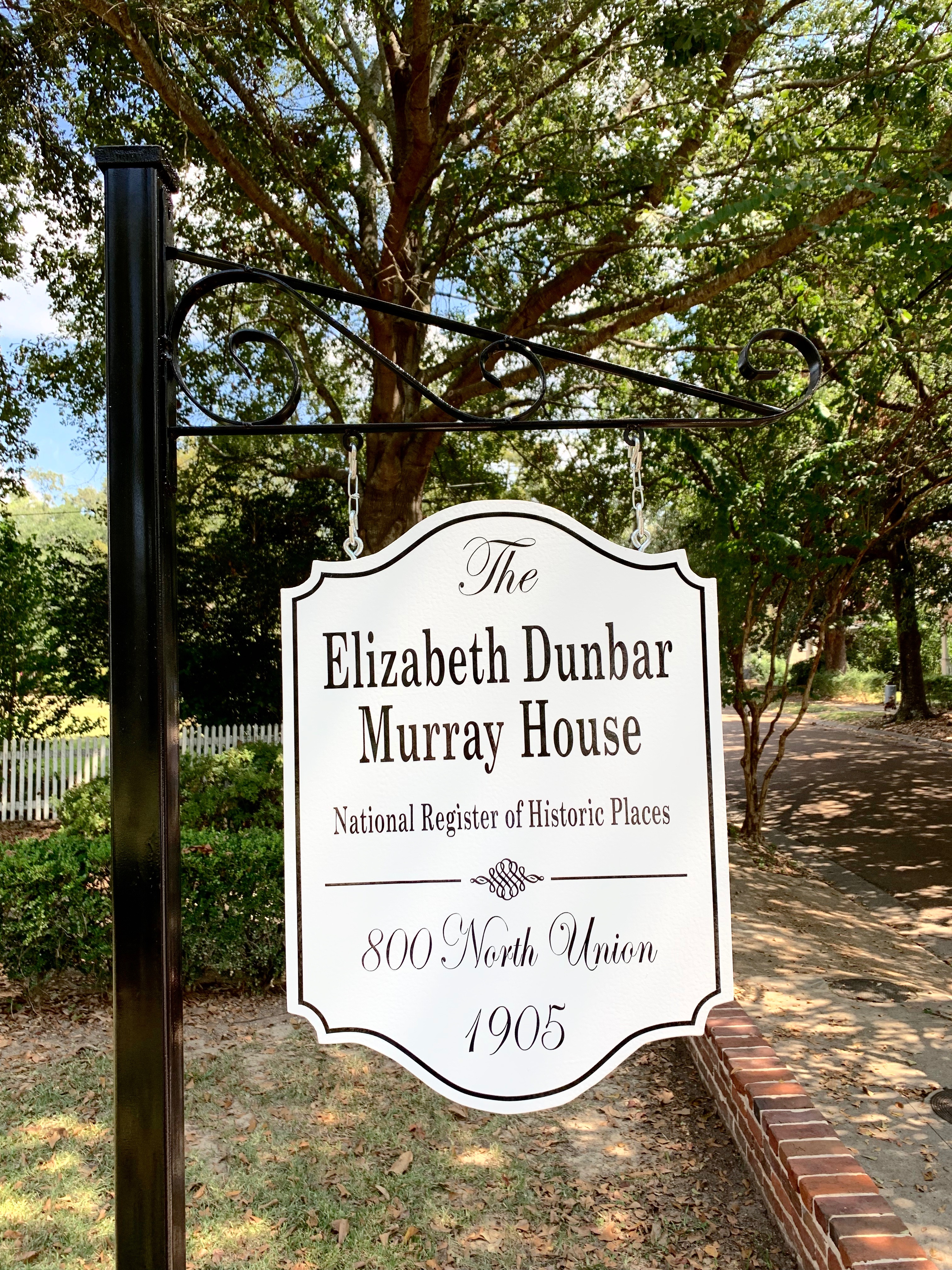

== Selected works ==
- Early Romances of Historic Natchez
- My Mother Used to Say: A Natchez Belle of the Sixties
