= Frederick Grant =

Frederick or Fred Grant may refer to:

- Frederick Dent Grant (1850–1912), American general and minister to Austria-Hungary
- Fred Grant (cricketer) (1891–1946), Trinidadian change bowler
- Freddy Grant (1905–1986), British Guiana-born British-American jazz and calypso musician
- Fred Grant (gridiron football) (1925–1993), American fullback and coach
- Freddie Grant, English footballer in 2018–19 National League semi-finals
