= Roger Grant (American football) =

Profile
- Position: Running back

Personal information
- Born: c. 1971; Chico, California, U.S.

Career information
- College: Butte College (1989); Utah State (1990–1991)

Roger Grant Jr. (born c. 1971) is a former American football running back. He played college football for Butte College and the Utah State Aggies. A native of Chico, California, Grant was the son of Roger Grant Sr., who played at the running back position for Humboldt State in 1963 and 1964. In 1989, he played for Butte College, rushed for 1,209 yards and 17 touchdowns, led the team to an 11–1 record and a victory in the Lions Bowl, and was named Golden Valley Conference player of the year. In 1990, he transferred to Utah State and tallied 1,370 rushing yards and in 1991 tallied 1,017 rushing yards. His yardage total in 1990 was the fifth highest in the country among major-college players. On September 8, 1990, he broke the Utah State single-game record with 292 rushing yards against Long Beach State. In his two years playing for Utah State, he tallied 2,387 rushing yards, 104 receiving yards, 27 passing yards, and 12 touchdowns.

== See also ==
- Utah State Aggies football statistical leaders#Rushing
