= Mary A. Grant =

- Born: November 10, 1890; Topeka, Kansas
- Died: February 17, 1987 (aged 96); Lawrence, Kansas
- Occupations: Classical scholar, College professor
- Awards: University of Kansas Women's Hall of Fame (1975)

Academic background
- Education: University of Kansas (B.A., M.A.); University of Wisconsin (Ph.D.)
- Thesis: The Ancient Rhetorical Theories of the Laughable: The Greek Rhetoricians and Cicero (1919)

Academic work
- Discipline: Classics
- Institutions: University of Kansas
- Main interests: Classical literature, Greek mythology, folklore, rhetoric
- Notable works: The ancient rhetorical theories of the laughable: the Greek rhetoricians and Cicero; Cicero's "Orator" and Horace's "Ars Poetica"; Folktale and Hero-tale Motifs in the Odes of Pindar

Mary Amelia Grant (November 10, 1890-February 17, 1987) was an American classical scholar.

== Biography ==
She was born on November 10, 1890, in Topeka, Kansas to Emerson Warren Grant, a civil engineer, and Jennie Bradbury Grant. In 1913, she earned a bachelor's Degree at the University of Kansas, where she subsequently earned her master's Degree in 1914. Later, in 1919, she earned her Ph.D. at the University of Wisconsin after having completed her dissertation entitled “The Ancient Rhetorical Theories of the Laughable: The Greek Rhetoricians and Cicero.” From 1916-1917 she worked as a Latin instructor at the Western College for Women in Oxford, Ohio, and then later—from 1921-1922—at the University of Kansas. Afterwards, from 1922-1960, she served as the professor of Latin and Greek, also at the University of Kansas. Within her tenure as professor, in the midst of the Great Depression, she took students into her home. From 1944-1960, she worked as the curator for the Wilcox Classical Museum. After retiring in 1960, she was later—in 1975—inducted into the University of Kansas's Women's Hall of Fame. During her life, she donated significant amounts of funding to the Classical Association of the Middle West and South, contributing to the establishment of the Mary A. Grant scholarship. Grant also donated the "Grant-Bradbury Collection" to the University of Kansas, which preserved letters and other materials related to the life of William H. Bradbury, her maternal grandfather and a soldier in the American Civil War. She died on February 17, 1987, in Lawrence, Kansas.

Her dissertation was described by the classicist Paul Shorey as a "serviceable assemblage of the material indicated by the title." Another classicist, T. Callander, offered more extensive praise, referring to it as a "creditable piece of work to the Wisconsin series." Callander states that it offered a "decided advance" on a then 20-year-old study on the same subject authored a scholar named Ernst Arndt. In a later publication, Folk-Tales in Pindar, Grant sought to catalogue various stories from the works of Pindar according to the Motif-Index of Folk Literature and compare them to Native American myths including similar motifs. While reviewing the work, the classicist Malcolm Willcock praises the factual accuracy of her writing, though he criticizes her original commentary as sometimes "injudicious" and occasionally reliant on misconstruing certain details of the text. In contrast, reviewer Noel Robertson praises her work as "original," lauding her book as providing a "valuable service" to scholarship, and recommending that similar work be undertaken for other Greek myths. Another reviewer, the classicist Edmund G. Berry, stated that it offers no new "revolutionary views concerning Pindar's relationship to folklore" and that "no new light is shed on the 'hero-tale' of the book's title." Geoffrey Kirk also reviewed this book, describing it as "unpretentious and pleasantly written" and stating that it draws attention here and there to some unusual characteristics of Greek myths." Ultimately, the classicist Hugh E. Pillinger concluded that the text was more valuable to a scholar of folklore than a classicist.

== Publications ==
- Grant, Mary A., and George Converse Fiske. “Cicero’s ‘Orator’ and Horace’s ‘Ars Poetica.’” Harvard Studies in Classical Philology, vol. 35, 1924, pp. 1–74. JSTOR, https://doi.org/10.2307/310709. Accessed 4 Oct. 2026.
- Grant, Mary A. “The Location of a Shrine of Vacuna.” The Classical Journal, vol. 18, no. 4, 1923, pp. 220–24. JSTOR, http://www.jstor.org/stable/3288704. Accessed 4 Oct. 2026.
- Grant, Mary A. “The Childhood of the Gods.” The Classical Journal, vol. 24, no. 8, 1929, pp. 585–93. JSTOR, http://www.jstor.org/stable/3289580. Accessed 4 Oct. 2026.
- Grant, Mary A., and George R. Waggoner. "The History of the Wilcox Museum and of the Department of Classics and Classical Archaeology at the University of Kansas 1866-1966." (1966).
- Grant, Mary A. The Syntactical Effects of Compounding Verbs with Prepositions. Diss. University of Kansas, 1914.
- Grant, Mary Amelia. The ancient rhetorical theories of the laughable: the Greek rhetoricians and Cicero. No. 21. University of Wisconsin, 1924.
- Grant, Mary A. "EDUCATION ON MT. OLYMPUS." The Classical Outlook 14.8 (1937): 45-46.
- Grant, Mary Amelia, ed. The myths of Hyginus. No. 34. Lawrence: University of Kansas Press, 1960.
- Grant, Mary A. "Folktale and Hero-tale Motifs in the Odes of Pindar." (1967).
