= Stephen Grant =

Stephen Grant or Steven Grant may refer to:

- Stephen Grant (comedian) (born 1973), British comedian and radio presenter
- Stephen Grant (footballer) (born 1977), Irish golfer and former footballer
- Stephen Grant, convicted for 2007 murder of Tara Lynn Grant
- Steve Grant (born 1969), American football player and motivational speaker
- Steve Grant, British singer, member of Tight Fit
- Steven Grant (born 1953), comic book writer
- Steven B. Grant (born 1983), mayor of Boynton Beach, Florida
- Steven Grant (character), one identity of the Marvel Comics fictional character Moon Knight
  - Steven Grant (Marvel Cinematic Universe), the character's Marvel Cinematic Universe counterpart
