= Kevin Grant =

Kevin Grant may refer to:

- Kevin Grant (soccer), Canadian soccer player
- Kevin Grant (historian), American academic historian
