= Kenneth Grant =

Kenneth Grant may refer to:

- Kenneth J. Grant (1839–1932), Canadian Presbyterian missionary
- Kenneth Grant (politician) (1866–1922), member of the Queensland Legislative Assembly
- Kenneth Grant (umpire) (1899–1989), West Indian cricket umpire
- Kenneth Grant (bishop) (1900–1959), Scottish Roman Catholic bishop
- Kenneth Grant (occultist) (1924–2011), English occultist
- Kenny Grant, American-Swedish basketball player and coach
- Ken Grant (born 1967), photographer
- Kenneth Grant (American football) (born 2003), American football player
