= Susan-Mary Grant =

Professor of American history

Susan-Mary Grant (born 1962) is a professor of American history at Newcastle University. Her works generally cover the history of the United States.

She received her PhD from the University of London. Her PhD supervisor was Peter J. Parish. After several temporary academic appointments, she joined the faculty of Newcastle University in 1992. In 1993 Grant co-founded and is the current chair of the association of British American Nineteenth Century Historians. She is on the editorial board of Nations and Nationalism. From 2005 to 2010 she was the editor of the American Nineteenth Century History journal. In 2007 she delivered the British Academy's Sarah Tryphena Phillips Lecture in American Literature and History.

In May 2016 Grant was part of the expert panel on BBC Radio 4's In Our Time episode on the Gettysburg Address and in March 2018 was on the panel for Tocqueville.

== Publications ==
- Grant, Susan-Mary (2016), Oliver Wendell Holmes, Jr. : Civil War soldier, Supreme Court Justice, Routledge historical Americans., Routledge, ISBN 978-0415656542
- Grant, Susan-Mary (2012), A concise history of the United States of America, Cambridge concise histories, Cambridge University Press, ISBN 978-0521612791
- Grant, Susan-Mary; Holden-Reid, Brian (2010), Themes of the American Civil War : the War between the States, Routledge, ISBN 978-0203872758
- Grant, Susan-Mary (2006), The war for a nation : the American Civil War, Warfare and history., New York, ISBN 9780415979900
- Grant, Susan-Mary; Parish, Peter J (2003), Legacy of disunion : the enduring significance of the American Civil War, Conflicting worlds., Louisiana State University Press, ISBN 9780807128473
- Grant, Susan-Mary (2002), New Light On The Lady With The Lamp - Susan-Mary Grant looks at the influence of Florence Nightingale on medical care in both the Crimea and the US civil war, History Today. 52, no. 9: [London, s.n.], p. 11, ISSN 0018-2753
- Grant, Susan-Mary (2000), North over South : northern nationalism and American identity in the antebellum era, Univ. Press of Kansas, ISBN 9780700610259
