= Gary Grant =

Gary Grant may refer to:

- Gary Grant (actor), British television actor
- Gary Grant (basketball) (born 1965), American basketball player
- Gary Grant (musician) (1945–2024), American musician
- Gary Grant (politician) (1934–2022), American politician
- Gary Grant (serial killer) (born 1951), American serial killer

== See also ==
- Cary Grant
