= Andrew Grant (physician) =

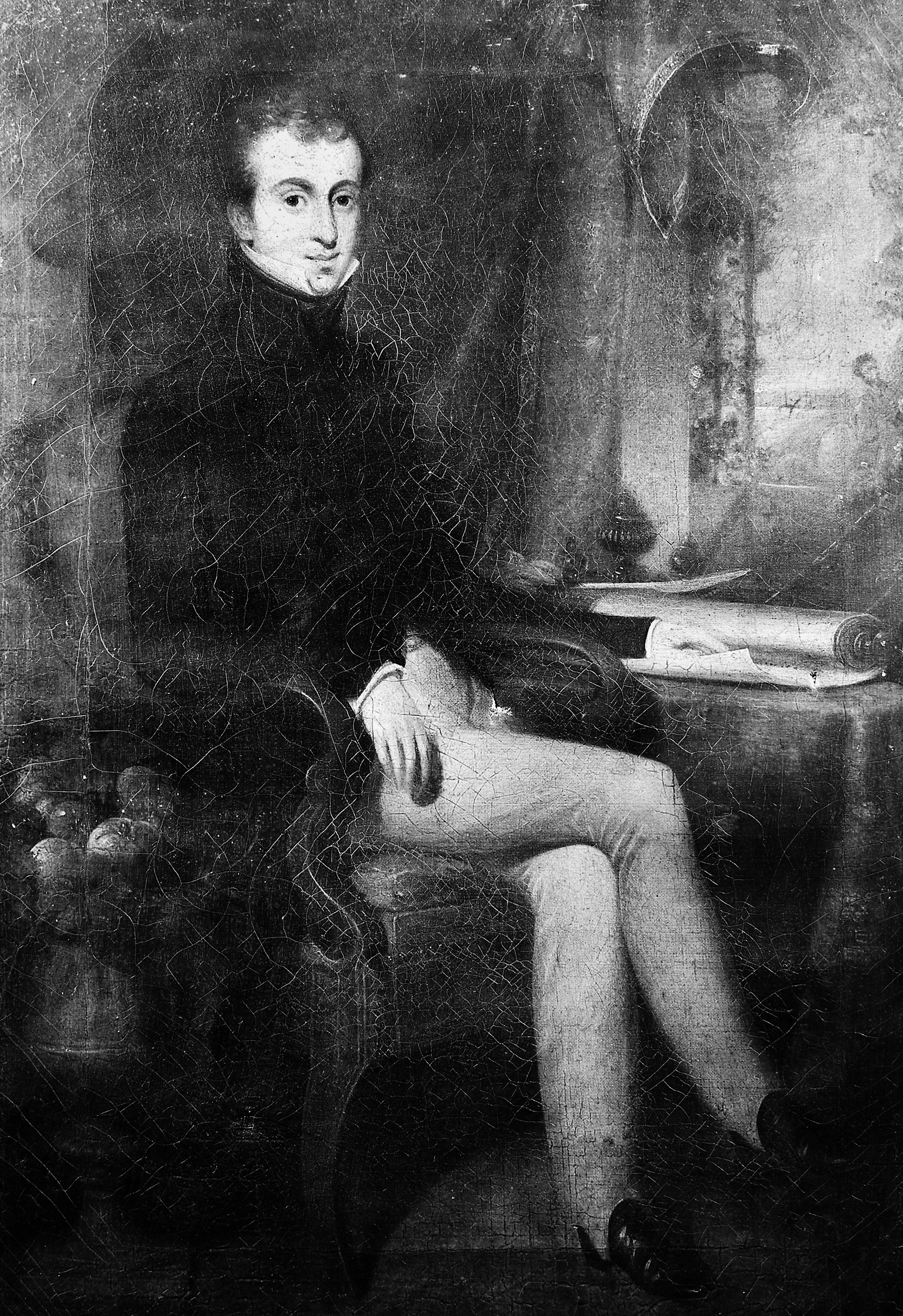
Andrew Grant

Andrew Grant, M.D. (fl. 1809) was a physician and writer.

Grant wrote a History of Brazil, 8vo, London, 1809, of which a French translation, with additions, appeared at St. Petersburg in 1811.
