= Thomas Grant =

Thomas Grant may refer to:

== Sports ==
- Tom Grant (baseball) (born 1957), American baseball player
- Thomas Grant (cricketer) (1879–1934), Australian cricketer
- Oliver Grant (rugby union) (Thomas Oliver Grant, born 1933), Scottish rugby player
- Thomas Grant (footballer) (born 1995), Scottish footballer
- Tommy Grant (Canadian football) (1935–2011), Canadian football player
- Tommy Grant (ice hockey) (born 1986), Canadian ice hockey player

== Other ==
- Sir Thomas Tassell Grant (1795–1859), English inventor
- Thomas Grant (bishop) (1816–1870), Catholic bishop
- Thomas Vincent Grant (1876–1966), Canadian senator
- Thomas Grant (barrister) (born 1969), English barrister and author
- Tom Grant (jazz musician) (born 1946), American smooth jazz pianist and vocalist
- Tommy Grant (EastEnders) (appeared 2004), character in the television series EastEnders
