= Larry Grant =

Larry Grant may refer to:

- Larry Grant (American football) (born 1985), professional football player
- Larry Grant (elder) (born 1936), Canadian educator and Indigenous elder
- Larry Grant (politician) (born 1946), Idaho businessman and politician
- Larry Grant (trainer) at Seagram Cup Stakes

== See also ==
- Lawrence Grant (1870-1952), English actor
