= Edith Jacqueline Ingram Grant =

American judge (1942–2020)

Edith Jacqueline Ingram

Personal details
- Born: Edith Jacqueline Ingram; January 16, 1942 Sparta, Georgia
- Died: June 5, 2020 (aged 78) Sparta, Georgia
- Parents: Robert T. Ingram (father); Katherine Hunt Ingram (mother)
- Relatives: Jerold O. Ingram; Robert L. Ingram
- Education: Fort Valley State College (BS)
- Occupation: Educator, Judge

Edith Jacqueline Ingram (16 January 1942 - 5 June 2020) was an American judge. She and Romae Turner Powell became the first African American women judges in Georgia in 1968-1969. Ingram served on Hancock County Court of the Ordinary for 36 years. She moved to Hancock County's probate court in 1973, making her the first African American woman probate judge in the United States. Her service to the courts resulted in recognition from the Georgia General Assembly. Before becoming a judge, she taught at Georgia schools.

== Early life ==
Born in 1942, Edith Ingram lived in Sparta, Georgia with her parents, Robert T. Ingram and Katherine Hunt Ingram, and two brothers, Jerold O. Ingram and Robert L. Ingram. She attended East End Elementary School and later graduated from L.S. Ingraham High School. After high school, Ingram attended The City College of New York to pursue a nursing degree. Ingram lived in New York for a brief time before returning to Georgia in 1960. She graduated from Fort Valley State College (FVSU) in 1963 with a Bachelor of Science in education.

== Career ==
Ingram worked as an elementary and high school educator in Griffin, Georgia and Sparta, Georgia before pursuing law in 1968. In 1973, she moved to Hancock County's probate court, making her the first African American female probate judge in the United States. She was responsible for overseeing marriages, wills, and civil disobedience cases. During his term as the Governor of Georgia, President Jimmy Carter awarded Ingram the honorary title of Lieutenant Colonel aide-de-camp and appointed her to serve as a member of the State Democratic Executive Committee. She later worked for Joe Frank Harris as a part of the Georgia Governor's staff. The Georgia House of Representatives and Georgia Senate both passed resolutions in February 2000, honoring Ingram for her then 32 years of service for the Hancock County Probate Court.

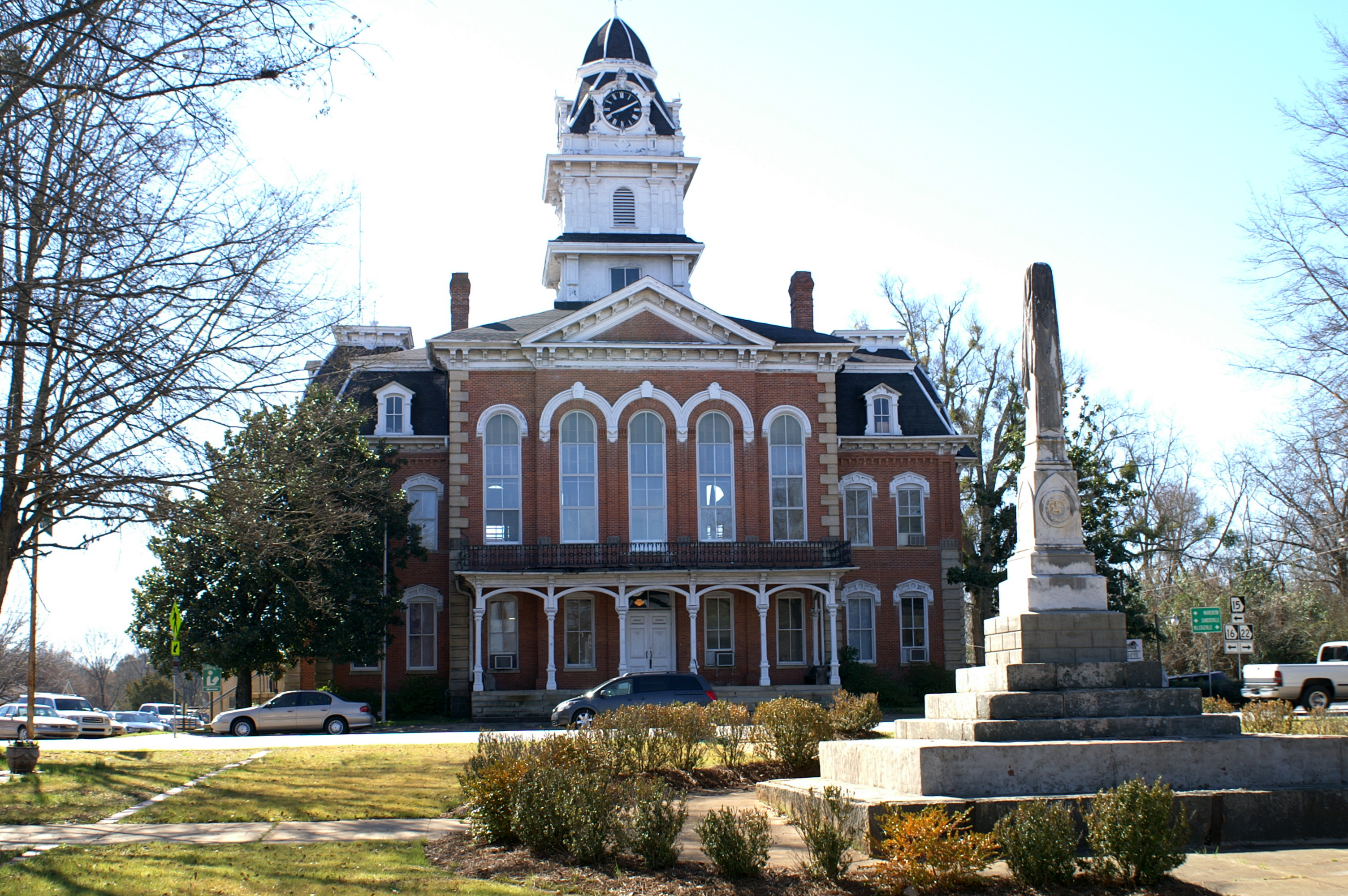
Hancock County Courthouse where Ingram-Grant presided over cases for 36 years.

Ingram continued to serve as a probate judge for Hancock County until 2004, when she retired after 36 years. She was honored in the collection Black Firsts: 4,000 Ground-Breaking and Pioneering Historical Events, which recognizes the achievements of African-Americans. She also has a scholarship named after her at FVSU.

Throughout her career, she was a member of multiple professional organizations including Delta Sigma Theta Sorority, the Hancock County NAACP, the Georgia Coalition of Black Women, and the Georgia Association of Probate Judges. As a member of the Georgia Coalition of Black Women, Ingram, along with others, supported increasing voter registration and ending poverty and drug use within African-American communities. Ingram also served as a board member of the Ebony International Learning Academy and Preparatory School.

== Personal life and death ==
Before her time as a judge, Ingram was an educator at Moore Elementary School in Griffin, Georgia and Hancock Central High School in Sparta, Georgia. Ingram was recruited by the Hancock County Democratic Club to run for public office. She was inspired to run for public office by her father, winning in 1968 and holding office for the next 36 years. On June 5, 2020, Edith Ingram died from natural causes at her home in Sparta, Georgia.

== Citations ==
12.^ "Running for freedom", by Steve Lawson. Page 159.

== Works cited ==
- Bland, Marben (November 24, 2019). "Judge Edith J. Ingram Scholarship". Marben Bland.
- Burse, Sabrina (June 8, 2020). "'She cared about all people': Hancock County mourns first black female judge". 13WMAZ.
- Craddock, Melissa (June 28, 1989). "Lowery urges coalition members to 'take charge of their destiny'". Houston Home Journal. Houston County, Georgia.
- Hudson, Sistie G. (February 14, 2000). "HR 1036-Ingram, Honorable Edith; commend". Georgia House Of Representatives Archives.
- Ingram, Edith (January 25, 2006). "The History Makers Video Oral History Interview with The Honorable Edith Ingram" (Interview). Interviewed by Evelyn Pounds. Sparta, Georgia.
- McDonald, R. Robin (June 9, 2020). "'True Advocate of Equality': Nation's First African American Probate Judge Dies at 78". Law.com. Daily Report.
- Smith, Faye (February 22, 2000). "SR 594 - Hon. Edith Ingram - commend". Georgia Senate Archives.
- Smith, Jessie Carnie (December 2012). Black Firsts: 4,000 Ground-Breaking and Pioneering Historical Events. United Kingdom: Visible Ink Press. p. 233.
- Velasquez, Angelina (June 5, 2020). "Probate Judge Edith Ingram passes at age 78". CBS46 News Atlanta. Archived from the original on 2021-04-30.
