= Isla Grant =

Scottish singer

- Born: Wigtownshire, Scotland
- Origin: Scotland
- Occupations: Singer, songwriter, musician
- Years active: 2000–present
- Website: islagrant.com

Isla Grant is a Scottish singer and songwriter. Born in Wigtownshire, Scotland, Grant grew up in a musical family and was greatly influenced by the folk music of her region. She learned to play the guitar and took an interest in American country music. Grant started her own record label I.G.E. and released her first album on her own label in October 2008. Her albums have experienced chart success in Australia and New Zealand, with six of them entering the top 10 on New Zealand's albums chart.

== Discography ==
=== Albums ===
List of albums, with Australian and New Zealand chart positions
| Title | Album details | Peak chart positions | |
| Title | Album details | AUS | NZ |
|---|---|---|---|
| Only Yesterday | Released: 2000; Format: CD; Label: CMR Records, Sony (88697758832) | - | - |
| A Dream Comes True | Released: 2001; Format: CD; Label: Rajon (CDR0101) | - | - |
| Mother | Released: 2002; Format: CD; Label: Rajon (CDR0042) | - | - |
| The Beauty of My Home | Released: 2003; Format: CD; Label: Rosette Records (ROSCD 2039) | - | - |
| Childhood Memories | Released: August 2003; Format: CD; Label: Rajon (CDR0030) | 92 | - |
| The Best of Isla Grant | Released: 2004; Format: CD; Label: CMR Records, Sony (88697434262); Note: Compilation | - | 6 |
| When the Day is Gone | Released: July 2005; Format: CD; Label: Rosette Records (ROSCD2058) Rajon (CDR0432) | 52 | 40 |
| Faith Love & Hope | Released: 2006; Format: CD; Label: Rosette Records (ROSCD 2069) | - | - |
| Isla Grant By Request | Released: 2006; Format: 3×CD; Label: Rajon (CDR0767); Note: Compilation | - | 20 |
| Down Memory Lane | Released: 2007; Format: CD; Label: Rosette Records (ROSCD 2081) | - | - |
| The Greatest Hits of Isla Grant | Released: 2007; Format: 2×CD; Label: CMR Records (CMCD2007); Note: Compilation | - | - |
| Down Memory Land (featuring Daniel O'Donnell) | Released: October 2007; Format: CD; Label: | - | - |
| Home for Christmas | Released: 2007; Format: CD; Label: CMR Records, Sony (88697598492) | - | - |
| Isla Sings Hank | Released: 2008; Format: CD; Label: I.G.E. (IGECD001) | - | 32 |
| Special to Me | Released: April 2009; Format: CD; Label: CMR Records, Sony (88697466472); Note: Compilation album | - | 3 |
| Movin' On | Released: June 2009; Format: CD; Label: I.G.E. (IGECD002) | - | 3 |
| The Essential | Released: April 2010; Format: CD; Note: Compilation album | - | 8 |
| Happy Anniversary / Breathless | Released: June 2010; Format: CD; Label: I.G.E. (IGECD003) | - | 7 |
| Lovesick and Blue | Released: 2012; Format: CD; Label: I.G.E. (IGECD004) | - | 10 |
| A Winter's Tale | Released: 2017; Format: Digital; Label: I.G.E. | - | - |
