= Neil Grant =

Neil Grant may refer to:

- Neil Grant (musician), Scottish composer of football club anthems
- Neil Grant (potter) (born 1938), New Zealand artist
- Neil F. Grant (1882–1970), English journalist, playwright
