= Jamie Grant (disambiguation) =

Jamie Grant (born 1970) is a retired Australian footballer.

Jamie Grant may also refer to:

- Jamie Grant (actress) (born 1986), Dutch actress starring in Flikken Maastricht
- Jamie Grant (comics), Scottish comics artist, see Alan Grant
- Jamie Grant, politician in Florida

== See also ==
- James Grant (disambiguation)
