= Mark Grant =

Mark Grant may refer to:

- Mark Grant (baseball) (born 1963), American baseball player
- Mark Lyall Grant (born 1956), British diplomat
