= Liz Grant (health researcher) =

Health researcher

Professor Liz Grant FRSE FRCPE
- Education: University of Aberdeen, University of Edinburgh
- Known for: Global health research and leadership

Elizabeth Grant is a Scottish academic who is an Assistant Principal and Director of the Global Health Academy at the University of Edinburgh She is a researcher and educator in the areas of palliative care compassion and global health and is a Fellow of the Royal Society of Edinburgh and the Royal College of Physicians in Edinburgh and holds a chair in Global Health and Development.

== International role ==
Grant sits on the Scottish Government NHS Global Citizenship Board which approves strategies and plans that support the policies and priorities set by the Scottish Government's International Development Strategy. She was on the Board of Directors for the Consortium of Universities for Global Health, (CUGH) and currently chairs the CUGH Research Committee.

== Education and research ==
Grant has a MA Religious Studies from University of Aberdeen and a PhD from University of Edinburgh. She has worked as part of Scottish initiatives in Malawi, Kenya and Zambia including working with Mhoira Leng, FRSE. She has been an advisor to global health charities and global health communities of practice.
