= Isobel Grant =

- Years active: 1630s
- Known for: Involved in infamous case of murder
- Father: Grant of Tulloch aka Fear Thulach aka McJokkie

Isobel Grant or Iseabail Dhubh Thulach (fl. 1637) was a historical figure in Scotland who was involved in an infamous case of murder.

== Biography ==
Isobel was the daughter of Grant of Tulloch (aka Fear Thulach, aka McJokkie). The Grants and the MacGregors were brought into dispute when Isobel had supposedly given her affections to a MacGregor named Iain Dubh Gearr.

A fight ensued near her family homestead when a rival suitor tried to claim her hand.

The MacGregors, and other men, are alleged to have attacked John Steuart, near Tulloch, Strathspey and the report states they:

'[S]hot him through the thighs, broke his thigh bones, cut off his fingers and cut off his head and danced and made merry about him a long time'.

== Legacy ==
This murderous event is believed to have inspired the composition of the Reel of Tulloch, a specific dance for males derived from a rough game of football that Tulloch men played with the severed head of an enemy.
