= Patrick Grant =

Patrick Grant may refer to:

- Patrick Grant (moderator) (1706–1787), Scottish minister and moderator of the General Assembly of the Church of Scotland
- Patrick Grant (Indian Army officer) (1804–1895), Indian Army officer and colonial administrator
- Patrick Grant (Australian politician) (1795–1855), New South Wales politician and newspaperman
- Patrick Grant (composer) (born 1963), American composer and performer
- Patrick Grant (designer) (born 1972), Scottish fashion designer
- Patrick Grant, Lord Elchies (1690–1754), Scottish judge
- Patrick Grant (rosarian) (1860–1945), Scottish-born Australian rose breeder
- Patrick Grant (American football) (1886–1927), American football player
