= Dan Grant =

USAID officer

Dan Grant was the Deputy Assistant to the Administrator for Pakistan in the Office of Afghanistan and Pakistan Affairs at USAID. He oversaw a portfolio concerning energy, stabilization, education, agriculture, and public health.

Prior to his appointment to USAID, Grant worked as an international affairs consultant for the U.S. State and Defense Departments, as well as for NATO, the U.S. Naval Postgraduate School, and the Czech foreign ministry.

Prior to his consulting work, he worked extensively in the field in a variety of post- and current-conflict countries, including Iraq, Afghanistan, Kosovo, and Bosnia. Particular highlights of his time overseas include working in the Iraqi elections ministry from 2005 to 2007, overseeing operations for the Afghan currency exchange in 2003, and working on the Afghan Loya Jirgas of 2002 and 2004. He was awarded the Constitutional Medal by Afghan president Hamid Karzai for his efforts in 2004.

In addition, Grant was a fellow at the American Security Project (ASP), a think tank founded by former U.S. Secretary of State John Kerry and former U.S. Secretary of Defense Chuck Hagel. His work for ASP ranged from analysis of international trade deals to the possible future of the Afghan Taliban.

Grant was a Democratic candidate for U.S. Congress in Texas's 10th congressional district in 2008. He is a graduate of the London School of Economics Graduate School, and Georgetown University’s Edmund A. Walsh School of Foreign Service.
