= Colquhoun Grant =

Colquhoun Grant may refer to:

- Colquhoun Grant (British intelligence officer) (1780–1829), British Army intelligence officer
- Colquhoun Grant (British cavalry general) (1772–1835), British Army cavalry general and MP
