= Joshua Grant =

Joshua or Josh Grant may refer to:

- Josh Grant (basketball) (born 1967), American basketball player
- Josh Grant (footballer) (born 1998), English footballer
- Joshua Grant, an American dancer with the Les Ballets Trockadero de Monte Carlo troupe
