= Hector Grant =

Australian cricketer

Personal information
- Born: 22 June 1924; Alberton, Australia
- Died: 3 September 1998 (aged 74); Clare, South Australia
- Source: Cricinfo, 6 August 2020

Hector Grant (22 June 1924 – 3 September 1998) was an Australian cricketer. He played in two first-class matches for South Australia in 1956/57.

== See also ==
- List of South Australian representative cricketers
