= Katherine Whyte Grant =

Scottish writer and translator

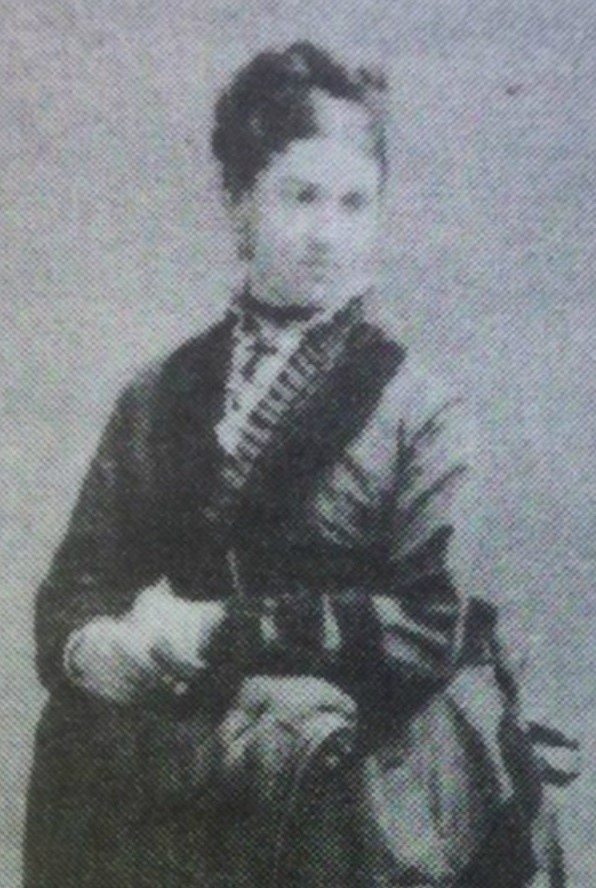
- Born: 11 April 1845; Bonawe Scotland
- Died: 18 August 1928 (aged 83); Oban Scotland
- Occupation: Writer translator

Katherine Whyte Grant, also known as Caitrìona Whyte Grannd or Catrìona Nic-’Ille-Bhàin Ghrannd (11 April 1845 – 18 August 1928) was a Scottish writer and translator of Gaelic and English. Whyte, who travelled in widely in Europe, Australia, South Africa and New Zealand, taught herself German, and translated Friedrich Schiller’s Wilhelm Tell from the original German into Gaelic. Whyte was interested in folk tales and educational materials in Gaelic, and her published works include plays for young people.

== Life ==
Grant was born in Bonawe, in Scotland. Her mother was Mary MacIsaac, and her father Henry Whyte was a schoolteacher and lay-missionary.

Whyte was married to William Grant in 1863. William died three years later. They had one daughter together who died in 1867. Whyte intended to undergo teacher training at the Normal School in Glasgow but was prevented by illness.

Whyte worked as a lady’s travelling companion in Romania during the 1870s, spending three years in Bucharest. She taught herself German in preparation for her travels. In Romania she became interested in European culture and folklore, and its comparison with the traditional Gaelic folklore passed down to her from her mother and grandmother. After returning to Scotland, Whyte worked for Lady Victoria Campbell as an assistant and biblewoman.

Grant translated Friedrich Schiller’s Wilhelm Tell from the original German into Gaelic (as Uilleam Tell, published in 1891 [3] or 1893). This was recognised as pioneering work in 1911. Grant had siblings in Australia, and from 1900 spent eight years travelling there and in South Africa and New Zealand, and later in life spent time in Norway. Throughout her life Grant supplemented her income by teaching Gaelic in classes or privately, and was engaged to speak “nothing but Gaelic” to Margaret Burnley Campbell and her daughter.

Grant maintained a correspondence with Gaelic scholar Malcolm MacFarlane, touching particularly on their shared interest of Gaelic education and materials for use with children at home as well as at school. Later in life Grant lived with her sister in Glasgow. Grant died in Oban, Scotland in 1928.

== Recognition ==
Her work was published in Myth, Tradition and Story from Western Argyll (1925) and she was awarded a Civil List Pension in 1914 in recognition of her Gaelic writing.

== Publications ==
Aig Tigh Na Beinne, published in 1911

Dùsgadh na Féinne, a Kinderspiel, published 1907

== See also ==
Mary MacKellar

Ella Carmichael
