= Walter Grant (footballer, born 1884) =

English footballer

Personal information
- Full name: Walter Grant
- Date of birth: 1884
- Place of birth: Cleethorpes, England
- Date of death: 5 November 1961 (aged 76–77)
- Position: Inside forward

Senior career*
Years	Team	Apps	(Gls)
1904	Grimsby Town	1	(0)
1904–1905	Grimsby Rangers		
1905–1906	Grimsby Town	8	(2)
1906–1907	Chesterfield Town	4	(2)
1907–1908	Grimsby Rangers		
1908–19??	Cleethorpes Town		
- * Club domestic league appearances and goals

Walter Grant (1884 – 5 November 1961) was an English professional footballer who played as an inside forward.
