= Oliver Grant =

Oliver Grant may refer to:

- Oliver Grant (rugby union) (1933–2022), Scottish rugby union player
- Oliver "Power" Grant (1973–2026), American businessman, producer, streetwear clothing mogul and actor
