= Jason Grant =

American music historian

- Born: Jason Benjamin Grant
- Education: Bates College; University of Pittsburgh (PhD)
- Occupations: Music historian; organist
- Years active: 2000s–present
- Style: Classical; Baroque

Jason Benjamin Grant is a music historian, most known for his work uncovering lost music by Telemann and Bach.

== Biography ==
During the 1990s, Jason Grant was known as an organist, with a special affinity for Baroque music.

He studied at Bates College and then at the University of Pittsburgh, where he obtained his doctorate in 2005 with a dissertation titled The Rise of Lyricism and the Decline of Biblical Narration in the Late Liturgical Passions of Georg Philipp Telemann.

He presented material from his dissertation at the 2003 meeting of the Wolfenbütteler Arbeitskreises für Barockforschung at the Herzog August Library in Wolfenbüttel, Germany. Part or all of the dissertation was published as Passion, Affekt und Leidenschaft in der Frühen Neuzeit (Suffering, Emotion, and Passion in the Early Modern Period) by Harrassowitz Verlag (Wiesbaden, 2005).

Following that, he was a visiting assistant professor of music at the University of Pittsburgh.

Currently, Grant is an Editor-in-Residence of the Carl Philipp Emanuel Bach: The Complete Works for the Packard Humanities Institute.

== Bibliography ==
- Grant, Jason (August 27, 2007), "Book Review: Jocques Henry. Mozart the Freemason: The Masonic Influence on His Musical Genius", Newsletter of the Mozart Society of America, 11 (2): 10, ISSN 1527-3733
