= Murdoch Grant =

Murdoch Grant (died March 19, 1830) was an itinerant peddler and murder victim of which the unusual circumstance regarding the capture of the murderer resulted from a local tailor who claimed to have witnessed the events in a dream.

During the spring of 1830, Grant visited the village of Assynt in the Scottish Highlands of Sutherlandshire to attend a wedding on March 19. However, after disappearing between Drumbeg and Nedd on March 11, his body was discovered four weeks later by a farm servant passing by the Loch-for-na-eigin, a remote mountain loch located almost a mile from Drumbeg. After dragging his body ashore, the servant observed the peddler's pockets had been emptied and turned inside out (Grant was known to be carrying a considerable amount of money) and his backpack missing as well as marks on his face showing signs of foul play.

However, local authorities were unable to solve the crime and Grant's murder remained unsolved for some time. However, after the local postmaster casually mentioned to Sheriff Lumsden about changing a £10 note with a suspicious looking man shortly after Grant's disappearance, Sheriff Lumsden questioned schoolteacher Hugh Macleod. After Macleod denied the postmaster's claim, the sheriff arrested Macleod and ordered a search of his house. None of the peddler's belongings were found however and, shortly before the sheriff was to release Macleod, a tailor named Kenneth Fraser came forward claiming he had experienced a dream in which he saw a vision of Macleod's cottage and in which he heard a voice speaking in Gaelic which told him "The merchant's pack is lying in a cairn of stones, in a hole near their house."

Leading authorities to Macleod's home, several articles belonging to Grant were found under a pile of stones. While there was some doubt to the tailor's story, the discovery of a pair of stockings later found in Macleod's possession provided enough evidence to bring Macleod before a Court of Justice. Tried before Lord Moncreiff of the circuit court in Inverness on September 27, Fraser testified against Macleod, who was found guilty of his murder for which he later confessed before his execution.
