= Michael Grant =

Michael Grant may refer to:

== Entertainment ==
- Michael Grant (classicist) (1914–2004), English author of books on ancient history
- Michael Grant (crime writer) (born 1940), New York policeman and author of police procedurals
- Michael Grant (television) (born 1951), Arizona television personality
- Michael Grant (author, born 1954), author of the Gone series
- Michael Grant, American actor in The Secret Life of the American Teenager

== Sports ==
- Michael Grant (American football) (born 1986), American football player
- Michael Grant (basketball) (born 1963), American college basketball coach
- Michael Grant (boxer) (born 1972), heavyweight boxer
- Michael Grant (tennis) (born 1956), American tennis player
- Mike Grant (1873–1955), Canadian ice hockey player
- Mick Grant (born 1944), English motorcycle road racer

== Other ==
- Michael Grant, 12th Baron de Longueuil (born 1947), nobleman with only French colonial title recognized by King/Queen of Canada
- Michael J. Grant (born 1949), member of the Florida House of Representatives
- Michael Grant (judge) (born 1963), Australian judge
- Michael Grant (musician), guitarist and founder of Endeverafter
- Michael S. K. Grant, British IT professional
