= Ronald Grant =

Ronald Grant may refer to:

- Ronald Grant (businessman), president & chief operating officer of AOL LLC
- Ronald Charles Grant, 10th Baron de Longueuil (1888–1959), British soldier and peer
- Ron Grant (motorcyclist) (1940–1994), Grand Prix motorcycle road racer and tuner
- Ron Grant (runner) (born 1943), Australian long distance runner
