= Peter Grant =

Peter Grant may refer to:

== Sportspeople ==
- Peter Grant (athlete) (born 1954), Australian Olympic sprinter
- Peter Grant (footballer, born 1879) (1879–1937), Scottish footballer
- Peter Grant (footballer, born 1965), Scottish football player and coach, played for Celtic and Scotland, manager of Norwich City
- Peter Grant (footballer, born 1994), Scottish football player, played for Falkirk, son of footballer born 1965
- Peter Grant (rugby union) (born 1984), South African rugby union player

== Other people ==
- Peter Grant (1714?–1824), known as Auld Dubrach, last survivor of the Jacobite rising of 1745
- Peter Grant (abbé) (died 1784), Scottish Roman Catholic priest, agent and abbé
- Peter Grant (politician) (born 1960), SNP politician elected 2015
- Peter Grant (journalist), journalist for The Wall Street Journal
- Peter Grant (music manager) (1935–1995), English music manager
- Peter Grant (pastor) (1783–1867), Scottish pastor, poet and songwriter known as Pàdraig Grannd nan Oran
- Peter Grant (singer) (born 1987), English singer
- Peter Grant (former broadcaster) (died 2025), former English television and radio presenter
- Peter and Rosemary Grant, evolutionary biologists at Princeton University
- Peter Grant (VC) (1824–1868), Irish Victoria Cross recipient
- Peter J. Grant (1943–1990), British ornithologist
- Peter Mitchell Grant (born 1944), Scottish academic
- Peter Grant (sculptor) (1915–2003), Irish sculptor
- Peter Grant, Canadian businessman and complainant in Grant v Torstar Corp, a leading Supreme Court of Canada case on defamation

== Other uses ==
- Peter Grant (book series), a series of fantasy novels by Ben Aaronovitch
