= Rosey Grant =

British meterologist

- Education: University of Leeds
- Scientific career
- Fields: meteorology
- Workplaces: Rothera Research Station; British Antarctic Survey

Rosey Grant is a British meteorologist who has worked for the British Antarctic Survey (BAS) at the Rothera Research Station in the British Antarctic Territory.

== Biography ==
Grant studied at the University of Leeds.

Grant began working from the British Antarctic Survey (BAS) in 2011. She is a meteorologist has worked as the physical sciences co-ordinator for the Atmosphere, Ice and Climate team at the Rothera Research Station in the British Antarctic Territory. She has contributed to publications of field season reviews.

Photographs taken by Grant during her work have been published in news reports about research discoveries and she ran a blog during the first year of her work at the Rothera Station called "Antarctica Through Rosey's Tinted Spectacles".

Grant has also contributed to published research on canopy air flows and precipitation instruments. Her research has been funded by the UK Natural Environment Research Council and the Forestry Commission.
