= Calvin A. Grant =

American ophthalmologist

Calvin Alexander Grant is an American ophthalmologist.

Grant was born in 1970 in Washington, D.C., to Jamaican parents, and spent a large amount of his childhood in the Washington Metropolitan Area. At the age of 21 he attended the University of Pennsylvania School of Medicine where he received the Oliver prize for ophthalmological research. His earlier research in gene transfer to the retina using adeno-associated viruses was one of the first. This work was conducted under the Howard Hughes Medical Student Fellowship.

Grant developed the first sustained treatment for ischaemic and non-ischaemic central retinal vein occlusion. His procedure, called revascularization by anastomotic decompression (RAD), allowed for communication between the blocked superficial retinal venous circulation and the open underlying choroidal circulation.

In a press release issued by ISTA Pharmaceuticals, which has a strong interest in the success of the drug, it was claimed that Grant demonstrated a significant decrease in the number of treatments of ranibizumab (Lucentis) needed for the treatment of choroidal neovascularization secondary to age-related macular degeneration by the concomitant administration of bromfenac (Xibrom). There was a significant reduction in the number of injections of ranibizumab given to those patients also receiving bromfenac during a six-month period. ISTA Pharmaceuticals at first claimed that there was no statistically significant visual acuity improvement amongst those receiving bromfenac in addition to ranibizumab, however; they now claim that upon "rigorous review" a significant improvement can be detected. ISTA Pharmaceuticals states that these results will need to be verified in clinical studies and that bromfenac is not currently approved for the treatment of age-related macular degeneration.

Grant has also become the first to introduce robotic radiosurgery in the treatment of choroidal melanoma.

Grant has had his license indefinitely suspended for a minimum of 6 months and fined $10,000 for performing a surgical procedure below the required standard of care and engaging in unprofessional conduct. https://idfpr.illinois.gov/content/dam/soi/en/web/idfpr/forms/discpln/2023-07enf.pdf
