= Judge Grant =

Judge Grant may refer to:

- Britt Grant (born 1978), judge of the United States Court of Appeals for the Eleventh Circuit
- Robert A. Grant (1905–1998), judge of the United States District Court for the Northern District of Indiana

== See also ==
- Justice Grant (disambiguation)
