= Henry Wood (Somerset cricketer) =

English cricketer

Henry Wood (7 April 1872 – 1 December 1950) played first-class cricket for Somerset in 1904. He was born and he also died at Bath, Somerset.

Wood played for Somerset in a single first-class match against Gloucestershire at Bath, batting at No 10 and scoring four in the first innings and 12 in the second, both times being not out when the Somerset innings ended. He did not bowl in the match, and nor did he take any catches.
