= Anthony Grant =

Anthony Grant may refer to:

- Anthony Grant (priest) (1806–1883), English Anglican priest and Archdeacon of St Albans
- Sir Anthony Grant (politician) (1925–2016), British Conservative politician
- Anthony Grant (basketball) (born 1966), American basketball coach
- Anthony Grant (footballer, born 1987), English football midfielder for Swindon Town
- Anthony Grant (footballer, born 1989), Jamaican football forward for St. Louis Ambush

== See also ==
- Tony Grant (disambiguation)
