= Ciara Grant =

Ciara Grant may refer to:

- Ciara Grant (footballer, born 1978)
- Ciara Grant (footballer, born 1993)
