= Ryan Grant =

Ryan Grant may refer to:

- Ryan Grant (running back) (born 1982), American football running back in the National Football League
- Ryan Grant (rugby union) (born 1985), Scottish rugby union player
- Ryan Grant (wide receiver) (born 1990), American football wide receiver in the National Football League

== See also ==
- Rhyan Grant (born 1991), Australian footballer
