= Malcolm Grant (disambiguation) =

Malcolm Grant may refer to:

- Malcolm Grant (born 1947), New Zealand-born British academic in law, Provost and President of University College London
- Malcolm Grant (East India Company officer) (1762–1831), English army officer in Bombay
- Malcolm Grant (priest) (born 1944), British Anglican priest, Provost of St Mary's Cathedral, Glasgow and then St Andrew's Cathedral, Inverness
- Malcolm Grant (basketball) (born 1988), American professional basketball player
