= Tony Grant =

Tony Grant is the name of:

- Tony Grant (Irish footballer) (born 1976)
- Tony Grant (English footballer) (born 1974)
- Tony Grant (singer) (born 1967), American singer and stage actor
- Toni Grant (1942–2016), American psychologist and radio talk show host

== See also ==
- Anthony Grant (disambiguation)
