= Lee Grant (disambiguation) =

Lee Grant is an American actress.

Lee Grant may also refer to:

- Lee Grant (footballer, born 1983), English football goalkeeper born in Hemel Hempstead, Hertfordshire
- Lee Grant (footballer, born 1985), English footballer born in York
- Lee Grant (New Zealand actress) (1931–2016), English-born New Zealand actress and singer
- An alias used by Luke Garner from the Shadow Children books

== See also ==
- Mr. Lee Grant, New Zealand pop star
