= Timothy Grant =

Timothy or Tim Grant may refer to:

- Tim Grant (general), Canadian army general
- Tim Grant (rugby league) (born 1988), Australian rugby league footballer
- T. J. Grant (born 1984), Canadian mixed martial artist
