= Beverly Grant =

Beverly Grant may refer to:

- Beverly Grant (athlete)
- Beverly Grant (actress)
