= Stan Grant =

Stan Grant may refer to:

- Stan Grant (journalist) (born 1963), Australian journalist
- Stan Grant (Wiradjuri elder) (born 1940), elder of the Wiradjuri tribe of Indigenous Australians

== See also ==
- Stanley Grant (1902–1993), British cinematographer and special effects expert
