= Bruce Grant =

Bruce Grant may refer to:

- Bruce Grant (alpine skier) (1963–1995), New Zealand skier
- Bruce Grant (biologist), American biologist
- Bruce Grant (writer) (1925–2022), Australian writer, journalist and diplomat
