= Darlene Grant =

Darlene Grant is a former associate professor in the School of Social work and an associate dean of graduate studies at the University of Texas at Austin. She joined the University of Texas in 1994. She was named 2006 Social Worker of the Year by the National Association of Social Workers. Her work focuses on incarcerated women and their children. She has been on leave of absence from the university since 2009 to join the Peace Corps. First in Cambodia and then in Mongolia.
