= Conor Grant =

Conor Grant is the name of:

- Conor Grant (footballer, born 1995), English football midfielder
- Conor Grant (footballer, born 2001), English football midfielder
