= Kim Grant =

Kim Grant may refer to:

- Kim Grant (footballer), Ghanaian footballer
- Kim Grant (tennis), South African tennis player
