= Gordon Grant (actor) =

American actor and model (1949–1993)

- Born: Don Bowman; April 25, 1949; Alaska, U.S.
- Died: October 1, 1993 (aged 44); Las Vegas, U.S.
- Occupations: Actor; Model
- Years active: 1975–1986
- Agent: Colt Studios

Gordon Grant (born Don Bowman; April 25, 1949 – October 1, 1993) was an American model and actor prominent in gay print media and adult cinema during the late 1970s and early 1980s. Known as the "Sultry Intellectual," he modeled for the Ah Men boutique and starred in productions for Colt Studios, Falcon Studios, and Bijou Video.

== Early life ==
Grant was born on April 25, 1949, in Alaska. Reports on Grant's birthplace conflict that he was born in New Mexico. His diverse heritage includes Dutch and Nez Perce Native American heritage. Before entering entertainment, he served in the U.S. Marine Corps and worked heavy labor, including two years on the Trans-Alaska pipeline, eventually relocating to Los Angeles through San Francisco and New York.

== Career ==
=== Modeling ===
Under his birth then he started modeling and had a successful career in the mid-1970s with a muscular, dark aesthetic that contrasted with blond archetypes of the era. He became a catalog fixture for West Hollywood's Ah Men boutique, helping define post-Stonewall men's fashion. He also collaborated with photographer Roy Dean—highlighted by the 1976 photo book Man of Moods: Nude Studies of Don Bowman and appeared as a centerfold in Drummer magazine alongside work for Troy Saxon.

=== Acting ===
Grant transitioned into adult films in the late 1970s, becoming a core figure for Colt Studios and starring in feature films like Hot Truckin' (1978), Hayride (1983), and Falcon's Dirty Words. Director Jim West noted Grant's remarkable modesty and lack of ego on set.

== Personal life ==
Grant retired in the mid-1980s, later he went to Las Vegas where he lived in a committed relationship.

== Death ==
He died from AIDS-related complications on October 1, 1993 in Las Vegas.

== Filmography ==
=== Film ===
Year	Title	Role	Notes
1976	Lifeguard	Lifeguard	Debut
1976	Dirty Words	Gordon	
1976	We Were There	Dunk Tank Thrower	
1977	Adonis Cockplay 14	Ron	
1978	Hot Truckin	Buck	Hand-In-Hand
1979	The Crotch Watcher	Jerry	
1983	Hayride	Brad	
1983	Pleasures in the Sun	Lifeguard	
1986	Working Late	Glenn	Falcon Studios
1986	Best Of Colt Films 3	Gordon	Colt Studios
1987	Best Of Colt Films 6	Gordon	Colt Studios
1992	Best Of Colt Films 12	Gordon	Colt Studios
1993	Best Of Colt Films 13	Gordon	Posthumous release
1996	Best Of Colt Films 14	Gordon	Posthumous release
2008	Best of the 1970's: Volume 1	Gordon	Posthumous release
2011	Hairy Muscle Daddy 2	Gordon	Posthumous release
2013	Falcon Bareback 13: Raw Prime Beef	Gordon	Posthumous release
2020	Goodbye Seventies	Gordon Grant	Posthumous release
2021	Falcon Icons: The 1970s	Gordon Grant	Posthumous release
