= Lewis Grant (British Army officer) =

General Sir Lewis Grant, KCH (born Ludovick Grant; died 26 January 1852) was a British Army officer and colonial administrator in the Caribbean.

Grant was born as Ludovick Grant in Forres, Moray, one of eight sons born to Duncan Grant, of Mulochaird in Strathspey, Scotland, and Jean Grant, daughter of Robert Grant of Keithmore, Banff, by Elizabeth Gordon. He was a younger brother of the physician Sir James Robert Grant, chief medical officer at Waterloo. Grant entered the army in 1794 as an ensign in the 95th Regiment, from which he was promoted to lieutenant in the 97th Regiment. In 1795, Grant was aboard HMS Orion under James Saumarez at the Battle of Groix. He was promoted to captain in 1796 and subsequently fought under Sir Ralph Abercromby in the West Indies.

In June 1801, Grant was appointed Assistant Quarter and Barrack Master General in Tobago and held the same position in Dominica in 1802. Promoted to major in 1802, he transferred to the 3rd West Indian Regiment and returned to England in 1803. Promoted to lieutenant-colonel of the 70th Regiment in 1804, he returned to the West Indies that year. Further promoted to colonel in 1813 and major-general in 1819, Grant was then appointed Governor of the Bahamas in 1820, then Governor of Trinidad in 1829. Serving in the latter post until 1833, Lionel Mordaunt Fraser's History of Trinidad (1971) states on the day after his departure on 22 June, the Port of Spain Gazette reported he was "hated by the negroes and detested by every independent member of the community".

On 13 September 1831, Grant was appointed a Knight Commander of the Royal Guelphic Order and Knight Bachelor, appointed colonel of the 96th Regiment of Foot on 9 April 1839 and awarded an honorary MA from Peterhouse, Cambridge in 1847.

On 11 November 1851, he was promoted to general and died suddenly from heart disease a few months later on 26 January 1852, aboard an omnibus on Regent Street, London, while he was travelling to his home on Harley Street. He was buried at Kensal Green Cemetery.

In 1832 he married Isabella Elizabeth Grant, daughter of Alexander and Margaret Grant of Tullochgriban. They had one daughter, Isabella Jean Margaret Grant (1842–1913), who married Lt Clinton Fraser Henshaw of the Rifle Brigade on 18 October 1859 at St James, Westminster, and had issue.

Government offices
Preceded by Charles Cameron	Governor of the Bahamas; 1821–1829	Succeeded by James Carmichael Smyth
Preceded by Charles Felix Smith	Governor of Trinidad; 1829–1833	Succeeded by Sir George Hill
Military offices
Preceded by Sir William Thornton	Colonel of the 96th Regiment of Foot; 1839–1852	Succeeded by Charles Edward Conyers
