= Albie Grant =

American basketball player (1943–2004)

Personal information
- Born: October 7, 1943 Manhattan, New York, U.S.
- Died: April 14, 2004 (aged 60)
- Listed height: 6 ft 4 in (1.93 m)

Career information
- High school: Christopher Columbus (Bronx, New York)
- College: LIU Brooklyn (1963–1966)
- NBA draft: 1966: 9th round, 79th overall pick
- Drafted by: St. Louis Hawks
- Position: Forward / guard
- Stats at Basketball Reference

Albert V. "Albie" Grant Jr. (October 7, 1943 – April 14, 2004) was an American college basketball standout at Long Island University (LIU), professional player for the ABA's New Jersey Americans, school teacher, and medical doctor.

== Basketball career ==
Grant was a native of Manhattan, New York City. He attended Long Island and played basketball for head coach Roy Rubin. Standing 6 ft 4 in (1.93 m), Grant played the forward position. His career at LIU lasted between 1963–64 and 1965–66, and upon his graduation he was the school's all-time leading scorer with 1,403 points as well as its all-time leading rebounder with 975 (both marks have since been surpassed). During his senior season, Grant averaged 20.1 points and 11.6 rebounds per game, both of which led the team, and at the end of the season he was honored with the Haggerty Award. The award has been given annually since 1935–36 to the top male collegiate basketball player in the greater New York City area. The Blackbirds won their second consecutive Tri-State League championship, and Grant finished his college career with averages of 20+ points and 10+ rebounds. To this day he is still the only player in program history with those combined career averages.

After college, Grant had a cup of coffee in the American Basketball Association while playing for the New Jersey Americans. His professional career was short-lived, however, and he moved on to other things after his time with the Americans.

In 2001, he was part of the inaugural class inducted into the LIU Athletics Hall of Fame.

== Later life ==
Grant got into teaching at various schools in New York City. The last school he taught at before his death was Manhattan High School. In the 1990s, Grant earned a medical degree from the Complutense University of Madrid in Spain.

On April 14, 2004, Grant died at age 60 following complications from diabetes.
