= Francis Grant =

Francis, Frances or Frank Grant may refer to:

- Sir Francis Grant, Lord Cullen (1658/1663–1726), Scottish judge
- Sir Francis Grant (artist) (1803–1878), Scottish artist
- Francis Chapman Grant (1823–1894), merchant-prince in the Gold Coast
- Sir Francis James Grant (1863–1953), Scottish Officer of Arms
- Francis William Grant (1814–1840), British Member of Parliament for Inverness-shire
- Frances Grant, screen name of the American actress and dancer Stella McCarron (1913–1982)
- Frank Grant (baseball) (1865–1937), baseball player
- Frank Grant (American football) (born 1950), former American football wide receiver
- Frank Grant (boxer) (born 1965), British boxer

== See also ==
- Francis William Grant (disambiguation)
