= Bud Grant (broadcaster) =

American television executive (1932–2011)

B. Donald "Bud" Grant (February 7, 1932 – July 1, 2011) was an American television executive. He originally started his career at NBC in 1956, and stayed there until 1972, when he joined CBS, and known for resurrecting game shows on the daytime lineup after a four-year absence since 1968, such as The Price Is Right. He served as the President of CBS Entertainment from 1980 until 1987. He was credited with spearheading 1980s CBS shows such as Newhart and Murder, She Wrote.

Grant was born in Baltimore, Maryland, and earned a Bachelor of Science in business from Johns Hopkins University. He served from 1953 to 1955 in the U.S. Coast Guard.

Grant left CBS in 1987 and founded his own production company, Bud Grant Productions, with an exclusive deal with CBS. He would later form Grant/Tribune Productions in 1988, which produced for Tribune Broadcasting and Walt Disney Studios, which signed in 1992. There, he produced the television series, Sydney and Cutters for CBS. In 1993, Grant split off from Tribune and reverted to the Bud Grant Productions name, and later that year, the company signed a deal with Warner Bros. Television under Les Moonves' watch. He later formed Third Coast Entertainment, and it was involved in a failed television biopic that sued Priscilla Presley.

Grant died in Newport Beach, California, on July 1, 2011.
