= Kathryn Grant =

Kathryn Grant may refer to:

- Kathryn Crosby (1933–2024), American actor who also used the stage name Kathryn Grant
- Kathryn Ptacek (born 1952), American author who also wrote under her married name, Kathryn Grant
- Katherine Grant, 12th Countess of Dysart (1918–2011), Scottish peer
- Cat Grant, fictional DC Comics character

== See also ==
- Kathy Stanford Grant, African American dancer, choreographer and Pilates instructor
