= Archie Grant =

New Zealand railway worker and trade unionist

Archibald Brewster Grant (24 July 1904 – 6 June 1970) was a New Zealand railway worker and trade unionist. He was born in Millerton, West Coast, New Zealand on 24 July 1904.
