= Gregor Grant =

Gregor J. Grant
- Born: 11 November 1911
- Died: 4 September 1969 (aged 57)
- Education: Glasgow School of Art
- Occupations: Author, journalist, racing car driver
- Spouse(s): May, then Eba
- Children: Gregor Grant, Don Grant, Simone Grant
- Writing career
- Genres: Non-fiction history and technology
- Subjects: Automotive and Automobile racing
- Notable works: Autosport magazine (founder and editor); "One man's Mille Miglia";

Gregor J. Grant was born in 1911. He attended the Glasgow School of Art and soon was contributing articles, drawings, and caricatures to newspapers and magazines including The Light Car. He was injured in Normandy during World War II.

In August 1950 he founded Autosport magazine which he edited until his death in 1969. Autosport was significant in being a weekly devoted almost entirely to motorsport, at a time when other publications were monthly or only partly reported competition. The timing was perfect as the British motor racing scene was growing rapidly, notably the new Formula 3, based on the British 500 cc Formula.

He participated in many rallies and hillclimbs, including the Lyons-Charbonnieres Rally in 1952 (driving with Stirling Moss in a Jaguar XK120), and the 1955 Tulip Rally in a Triumph TR2. He entered the 1956 Mille Miglia one-thousand-mile road race in an MG Magnette. For 1957 he drove a factory-prepared Lotus Eleven. "One man's Mille Miglia" is an account of his experiences in the 1957 race.

The Autosport Magazine Gregor Grant Award for lifetime achievement in motor sport is awarded annually at the Autosport Awards.

== Bibliography ==
- (1947) British Sportscars
- (1949) The Boy's Book of Motor Sport
- (1949) Modern Motor Cars
- (1950) 500cc Racing
- (1953) Formula 2
- (1954) High-performance Cars 1954-55 (with John Bolster)
- (1956) High-performance Cars 1955-56 (with John Bolster)
- (1956) High-performance Cars 1956-57 (with John Bolster)
- (1957) High-performance Cars 1957-58 (with John Bolster)
- (1958) High-performance Cars 1958-59 (with John Bolster)
- (1959) World Championship
- (1960) High-performance Cars 1959-60 (with John Bolster)
- (1962) High-performance Cars 1962-63 (with John Bolster)
- (1963) High-performance Cars 1963-64 (with John Bolster)
- (1964) High-performance Cars 1964-65 (with John Bolster)
- (1969) AJS, The History of a Great Motorcycle

== Article ==
- (1957) "One man's Mille Miglia"
