= Elizabeth Grant (songwriter) =

Scottish songwriter

Elizabeth Grant (later Murray) of Carron (1745?–1814?) was a Scottish songwriter, from Carron, Speyside. She is best known as the writer of Roy's Wife of Aldivalloch.

== Life ==
She was the daughter of "Lieutenant Joseph Grant, late of Colonel Montgomerie's regiment of highlanders", and was probably born about 1745, near Aberlour, on the Spey, Banffshire. She was married about 1763 to her cousin, Captain James Grant of Carron, near Elchies, on the Spey. Grant being unfortunate, sold Carron in 1786 or 1787 to Robert Grant of Wester Elchies, and in 1790 he died within Holyrood. Mrs. Grant was afterwards married to Dr. Murray, a Bath physician, and she died in Bath about 1814. A portrait of her was at Castle Grant.

Roy's Wife, Mrs. Grant's only known production, instantly became popular. Its allusions bear upon persons and places on the Aberdeen border of Mrs. Grant's native county. There are fragments of a legendary lyric with several of the same references, but Roy's Wife superseded those, besides appropriating to itself the old Ruffian's Rant to which it was sung. Writing to Thomson in 1793 and 1794, Robert Burns referred to the song, and himself makes a little English experiment to the same tune, in a conciliatory address to Mrs. Riddel. As in these letters Burns calls the air 'Roy's Wife,' while his 'Ladie Onlie,' written for Johnson's 'Museum' in 1787 is set to the tune 'The Ruffian's Rant,' we get an approximate date for the appearance of Mrs. Grant's song.
