= Norman Grant (politician) =

Jamaican politician

Norman Washington Grant, OD, is a Jamaican politician. A member of the People's National Party, he is a former senator and was president of the Jamaican Agricultural Society (JAS) from 2003 to 2009 and 2012 to 2018.

== Career ==
A member of the People's National Party (PNP), Grant was elected to the Senate of Jamaica in 2001, 2002, 2008, and 2011, as a member of the agricultural sector in the senate's Upper House. From 2003 to 2009, Grant was the president of the Jamaican Agricultural Society (JAS). As JAS president, Grant spearheaded the successful "Eat Jamaican" initiative which encouraged Jamaicans to consume more local produce. Launched in November 2003, the programme reduced Jamaican import expenditure by around US$500 million after some twelve years, and increased local agricultural output by roughly 490 tonnes (540 tons) by 2017. He was succeeded by Montego Bay mayor Glendon Harris as JAS president and from 2009 to 2012, Grant served as the society's vice-president. Harris declined to run for another term and Grant was reelected as JAS president in July 2012. In 2018, having served two consecutive terms as president, Grant became ineligible for reelection and was succeeded by Lenworth Fulton.

Grant founded and directed the Caribbean Farmers' Network (CaFAN) and is the current chairman of the Jamaica Coffee Exporters Association. He is also the chief executive officer and managing director of Mavis Bank Coffee Factory.

== Recognition ==
In October 2015, Grant was awarded with the Order of Distinction (Officer Class). In December 2019, he was awarded the Distinguished Member Lifetime Achievement Award by the Jamaica Coffee Exporters Association.
