= Percy Grant (Royal Navy officer) =

Royal Navy Admiral and also Chief of the Royal Australian Navy (1867–1952)

Admiral Sir Percy Grant KCVO CB
- Born: Edmund Percy Fenwick George Grant; 23 September 1867
- Died: 8 September 1952 (aged 84)
- Military career
- Allegiance: United Kingdom
- Branch: Royal Navy
- Service years: 1881–1928
- Rank: Admiral
- Commands: Admiral Superintendent Portsmouth Dockyard (1922–25); Chief of the Australian Naval Staff (1919–21); HMS Ramillies (1917–19); HMS Marlborough (1914–15); HMS King Edward VII (1913–14); HMS Falmouth (1911–13); HMS Gibraltar (1910–11); HMS Arrogant (1910); HMS Halcyon (1906–08)
- Conflicts: Anglo-Egyptian War; Brazilian Naval Mutiny; First World War; Second World War
- Awards: Knight Commander of the Royal Victorian Order; Companion of the Order of the Bath

Admiral Sir Edmund Percy Fenwick George Grant, KCVO, CB (23 September 1867 – 8 September 1952) was a Royal Navy officer who served as First Naval Member and Chief of the Australian Naval Staff from 1919 to 1921.

== Naval career ==
Grant saw service in the Egyptian War of 1882 as well as the Brazilian Naval Mutiny in 1893. He was promoted to lieutenant on 1 October 1890, posted as a lieutenant for navigation on the battleship HMS Mars, and promoted to commander (Navigation) on 26 June 1902. In September 1902 he was posted to HMS President for study at the Royal Naval College, and in January the following year he was posted to the battleship HMS Ramillies, serving in the Mediterranean Fleet.

He went on to serve during the First World War initially as flag captain to Vice Admiral Sir Lewis Bayly in HMS Marlborough and then as flag captain and chief of staff to Admiral Sir Cecil Burney who was then second-in-command of the Grand Fleet. In that capacity he saw his ship torpedoed and crippled at the Battle of Jutland in 1916.

After the war he was appointed First Naval Member and Chief of the Australian Naval Staff. In this role, he served as defence advisor to Billy Hughes, Prime Minister of Australia at the Empire Conference in London in 1921. He was appointed Admiral Superintendent at Portsmouth Dockyard in September 1922 and served there until January 1925. He retired from the navy in 1928. He was recalled during the Second World War to serve as Captain at the Port of Holyhead.

Military offices
Preceded by Rear Admiral Sir William Creswell	Chief of the Australian Naval Staff; 1919–1921	Succeeded by Vice Admiral Sir Allan Everett
Preceded by Rear Admiral Sir Edwyn Alexander-Sinclair	Admiral-superintendent, Portsmouth; 1922–1925	Succeeded by Rear Admiral Bertram Thesiger
