= Liz Grant =

Australian pharmacist and politician (1930–2023)

Mary Elizabeth Grant AM (23 February 1930 – 7 February 2023) was an Australian pharmacist and politician.

Grant was a Liberal member of the Australian Capital Territory House of Assembly for Canberra from 1979 to 1982. Following the loss of her seat she became Chairman of the Australian Capital Territory (ACT) Health Services Council and a member of the Parole Board, serving until 1985 when she was appointed to the Hospital Services Board. From 1986 to 1989 she was President of the ACT Division of Business and Professional Women and in 1987 was Chairman of the ACT Health Authority; in that year she was also appointed a Member of the Order of Australia. She remained active on several health-related boards and councils in the Australian Capital Territory throughout the 1990s. Grant died in Canberra on 7 February 2023, at the age of 92.
