= Los Gatos High School =

Public high school in Los Gatos, California, United States

Coordinates: 37.222000°N 121.976280°W

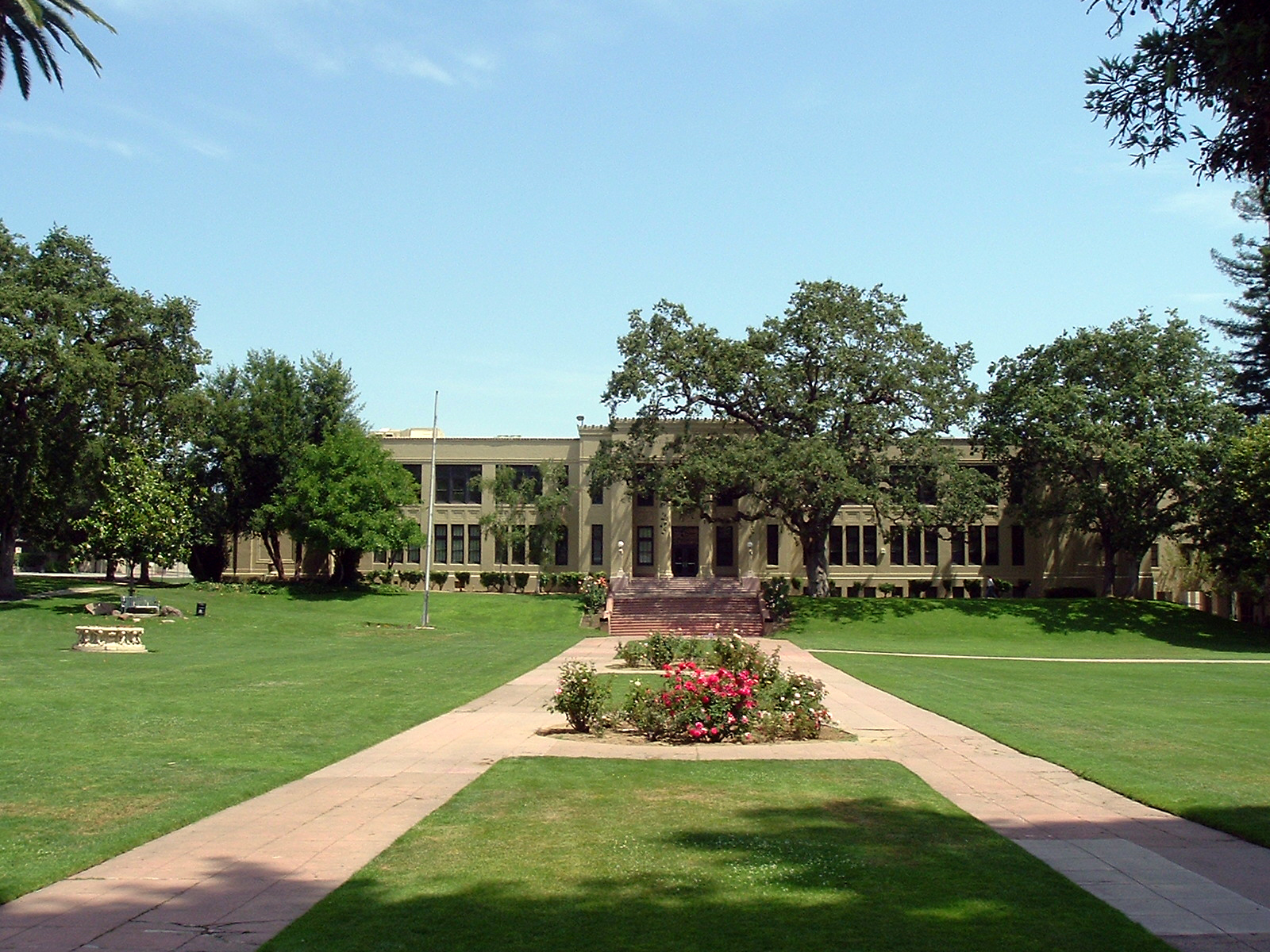
- Los Gatos High School is located on E. Main Street in Los Gatos, California

Location
- 20 High School Ct. Los Gatos, California 95030; United States

Information
- Type: Public high school
- Established: 1908; 118 years ago
- School district: Los Gatos-Saratoga Joint Union High School District
- Principal: Dave Poetzinger
- Staff: 96.62 (FTE)
- Grades: 9–12
- Enrollment: 1,977 (2023–24)
- Student to teacher ratio: 20.46
- Colors: Orange; Black
- Athletics conference: Santa Clara Valley Athletic League; CIF Central Coast Section
- Mascot: Willy the Wildcat, Wilma the Wildcat
- Team name: Wildcats
- Communities served: Los Gatos, Monte Sereno, Saratoga
- Feeder schools: Fisher Middle School, C.T. English
- Website: http://www.lghs.net/

Los Gatos High School (LGHS) is a high school in Los Gatos, California. It was founded in 1908 and is part of the Los Gatos-Saratoga Joint Union High School District, which in 2021 was ranked the best high school district in California

The school enrolls approximately 2,100 students and employs about 100 teachers. Los Gatos High School is accredited by the Western Association of Schools and Colleges (WASC) and has regularly received six-year accreditations, the highest possible. It has been recognized twice as a National School for Excellence. LGHS is also notable for its sports programs, most recently winning a Central Coast Section football title in 2019. The Los Gatos Wildcats are part of the Santa Clara Valley Athletic League of the CIF Central Coast Section.

== History ==
Los Gatos High School, originally Los Gatos Union High School, was founded in 1908 and remains the only high school in Los Gatos. From the late 1880s until then, high school age students were taught at Los Gatos Central School, a grammar school which was established in 1886. The original building was in Mission Revival style, and on the site of the current library. The current Neoclassical main building was dedicated on January 17, 1925; it was built using a $250,000 bond measure passed in 1923, and was designed by W. H. Weeks, a famous architect of schools in California. The former building continued in use but was gradually demolished and by 1955 had entirely disappeared. The main building was extensively renovated in the mid-1960s, reopening in 1967. In 2001, the town of Los Gatos passed a $79 million bond measure for a new renovation, which included several new buildings.

Due to the unusual joint cooperative nature of the Los Gatos-Saratoga Joint Union High School District, until 2005, Saratoga High School shared Los Gatos High School's Prentiss Brown Auditorium for performing arts and, until 2006, they shared Helm Field for football games. Both are on the grounds of Los Gatos High School but are available for equal use by both schools. When the two schools played each other, the title of home team rotated between them each year.

== Academics and activities ==
Los Gatos High School is well known for its rigorous academics. In 2021, Niche ranked Los Gatos High School as #37 with California. In 2021, 96% of graduating seniors went on to attend college, including 74% to four-year colleges, and had an average SAT score of 1326 and average ACT composite score of 29.8. During 2019–20 school year, 73% (387 students) of LGHS class of 2021 took at least one AP course.

Students participate in over 70 academic, athletic and community service activities that annually raise over $100,000 for charities and non-profit organizations.

== Notable alumni ==
Notable alumni of Los Gatos High School include:

- Jared Allen, former NFL defensive end
- Kiko Alonso, former NFL linebacker
- Nick Bawden, former NFL fullback
- Todd Beamer and Mark Bingham, passengers of United Airlines Flight 93 on 9/11, believed to have stormed cockpit after hijacking
- Lynn Burke, swimmer, winner of two gold medals in at the 1960 Summer Olympics in Rome, Italy
- Kari Byron, best known for her appearances on Discovery Channel show MythBusters
- Hugh Campbell, former head coach of NFL Houston Oilers, Canadian Football League Edmonton Eskimos, winner of 10 Grey Cup championships.
- Robert Chambers (1944), track & field, second-fastest all-time high school 880 as of that date; 3rd NCAA 880 for USC 1948; 6th 1948 London Olympics 800 meters
- Hal Chase, MLB player (New York Highlanders, New York Yankees, Chicago White Sox, Cincinnati Reds, New York Giants)
- Devin Cooley, NHL goaltender for the Calgary Flames
- Jordan Corey, singer/songwriter
- Michael Eugene Couchee, former Major League Baseball player
- Trent Edwards, former NFL quarterback, 2007–2014
- Bill Fairband, former NFL linebacker
- Joan Fontaine, Academy Award-winning actress, estranged sister of Olivia de Havilland
- Scott Frank, screenwriter, wrote screenplays to Get Shorty and Minority Report
- Susan M. Gaines, novelist known for climate fiction and science in fiction. Author of the novels Accidentals and Carbon Dreams, and of the science book Echoes of Life: What Fossil Molecules Reveal about Earth History
- Olivia de Havilland, two-time Academy Award-winning actress who played Melanie Hamilton Wilkes in Gone with the Wind, estranged sister of Joan Fontaine
- Sandy Hill, mountaineer who successfully climbed the Seven Summits and author.
- Jeffrey Hornaday, choreographer and director. Choreographed Flashdance and Madonna world tours
- Dan Jinks, producer of American Beauty, Big Fish and Down with Love
- Jason Jurman (Class of 1998), former actor (Cougar Club)
- Lynette Knackstedt (Class of 1988), former ska musician
- Chris Knapp, drummer for The Ataris
- Audrey Long, former film actress
- Fred Markham, Olympic bicycle racer
- Ryan Nyquist, professional BMX rider
- Mike Park, musician Skankin' Pickle, and owner of Asian Man Records
- Greg Peters, former NFL offensive guard
- Logan Schafer, MLB player (Milwaukee Brewers)
- Shane Smith, former NFL fullback
- Jackson Stewart, professional bicycle racer
- Terry Scott Taylor, lead singer and songwriter for Daniel Amos, The Swirling Eddies; founding member of Lost Dogs
- Jake Tonges, NFL player (San Francisco 49ers)
- Tommy Troy, MLB player (Arizona Diamondbacks)
- Christine von Saltza, swimmer, winner of three gold medals and one silver medal at the 1960 Summer Olympics in Rome, Italy
- Carrie Yazel, Playboy Playmate of the Month, May 1991
- Members of bands Dredg, Marco Pitruzzella, Trapt and Skankin' Pickle

== In the media ==
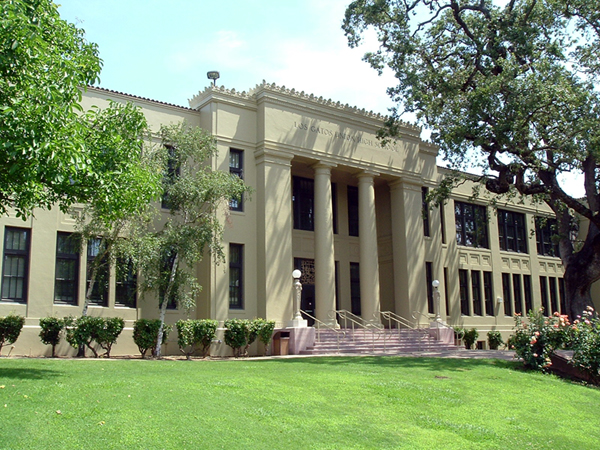
Los Gatos High School was originally called "Los Gatos Union High School", which still appears engraved on the front of the main building.

The front façade of the school was shown on The Amanda Show starring Amanda Bynes. It was used in the show's soap opera spoof segment called "Moody's Point". The front exterior of the school was also used on Saved by the Bell.

The school was also used as a filming location for several scenes in the 1996 made-for-TV movie Lying Eyes.

The school, its stadium and track, and nearby Santa Cruz Avenue were also used for filming an episode of the 1986 television series Starman; drama students played the role of some extras.

The 1988 made-for-TV film Quiet Victory: The Charlie Wedemeyer Story was based on the life of former Los Gatos High School head football coach Charlie Wedemeyer, who was stricken with Amyotrophic lateral sclerosis and continued to coach the football team for several years. The movie was actually filmed in Goose Creek, South Carolina, at Stratford High School.

In 1992, Principal Ted Simonson, former Dean of Boys during earlier decades, attracted media controversy for a series of racist and bigoted jokes he made during a roast at the Lions Club in which he referred to female joggers as "jigglers" and described gay-friendly city of San Francisco as "Fairyland" and the city of Oakland, California, with its large African-American population, as "Jungleland."

In 2021, Mark Rober used the school's football field to test his robotic field kicking machine.

In 2021, NBC Bay Area published an investigative report about "a wave of sexual misconduct allegations by current and former Los Gatos High School students on social media". The report details an ongoing student-led movement to change the culture of LGHS that gained momentum in 2020.

== Principals ==
- Henry Meade Bland (1887–1889) – later California Poet Laureate
- C. H. Crowell (1889–1891)
- H. E. Shumate (1891–1895)
- A. M. Kelley (1895–1898)
- Louis K. Webb (1898–1899)
- George C. Russell (1899–1901)
- W. W. Wilson (1901–1905)
- Charles I. Kerr (1905–1908)
- Allan B. Martin (1908–1909)
- Frank M. Watson (1909–1915)
- Edwin Forrest Blayney (1915)
- W. F. Walton (1916–1918)
- E. N. Mabrey (1918–1920)
- Irving Wallace Snow (1920–1922)
- J. Warren Ayer (1922–1931)
- Prentiss Brown (1931–1956)
- Fred Canrinus (1957–1970) – older principals
- Dr Allen Coryell (1971–1978)
- Ted Simonson (1978–1998)
- Trudy McCullough (1998–2005)
- Doug Ramezane (2005–2009)
- Markus Autrey (2009–2015)
- Kristi Grasty (2015–2020)
- Paul Robinson (2020–2021, interim)
- Kevin Buchanan (2021–2024)
- David Poetzinger (2024–present)
