= Richard Grant =

Richard Grant may refer to:

- Richard E. Grant (born 1957), British-Swazi actor
- Richard E. Grant (paleontologist) (1927–1995), American paleontologist
- Richard Grant (author) (born 1952), science fiction and fantasy author
- Richard Grant (writer) (born 1963), travel writer
- Richard Grant (diplomat), New Zealand diplomat; see List of ambassadors of New Zealand
- Richard Grant (cricketer) (born 1984), Welsh cricketer
- Richard Grant (Royal Navy officer) (1783–1859), British Royal Navy officer
- Richard P. Grant, British biologist
- Richard W. Grant (1862–1939), architect based in Beatrice, Nebraska
- Richard le Grant, Archbishop of Canterbury from 1229 to 1231
- Dick Grant (1878–1958), American track and field athlete

== See also ==
- Richie Grant (disambiguation)
