= Saratoga Union School District =

School district in California, United States

Address
- 20460 Forrest Hills Drive Saratoga, California, 95070; United States

District information
- Type: Public
- Grades: TK–8
- Established: 1865; 161 years ago
- Superintendent: Dr. Kenneth Geisick
- NCES District ID: 0635910

Students and staff
- Students: 1,657 (2020–2021)
- Teachers: 83.18 (FTE)
- Staff: 90.96 (FTE)
- Student–teacher ratio: 19.92:1

Other information
- Website: www.saratogausd.org

The Saratoga Union School District is a school district for primary and middle schools in the city of Saratoga in Santa Clara County, California. It was established in 1865 and covers the majority of the city of Saratoga as well as small sections of Monte Sereno and Los Gatos.

The district is responsible for educating children from transitional kindergarten to grade 8. As of 2018 it has 3 elementary schools and one middle school (grades 6 to 8). The Los Gatos-Saratoga Joint Union High School District provides education from grade 9 onwards in the local area.

The Redwood Middle School Marching Band and Color Guard was selected to represent the state of California in the 56th Presidential Inaugural Parade of President Barack Obama in Washington, D.C., on January 20, 2009. Argonaut Elementary School and Redwood Middle School were named National Blue Ribbon Schools in 2018.

== Schools ==
The schools in the Saratoga Union School District are:

- Argonaut Elementary School (grades TK–5)
- Foothill Elementary School (grades TK–5)
- Saratoga Elementary School (grades K–5)
- Redwood Middle School (grades 6–8)
