= Lakeside Joint School District =

School district in California, United States

Address
- 19621 Black Road Los Gatos, California, 95033; United States

District information
- Grades: PreK through 5th
- Schools: Lakeside Elementary School
- NCES District ID: 0620700

Students and staff
- Students: 66 (2020–2021)
- Teachers: 4.0 (FTE)
- Staff: 7.74 (FTE)
- Student–teacher ratio: 16.5:1

Other information
- Website: www.lakesidelosgatos.org

Lakeside Joint School District is a public school district in both Santa Clara County, California, United States and Santa Cruz County, California, United States. Although approximately two-thirds of the district is in Santa Cruz County, the physical location of the sole school, Lakeside Elementary, is in Santa Clara County, and the district reports to the Santa Clara County Board of Education.

Residents of this school district are zoned to high schools in the Los Gatos-Saratoga Joint Union High School District, with the default high school being Los Gatos High School. Currently the district partners with Loma Prieta Joint Union School District and Campbell Union School District to educate their middle school students at C.T. English and Rolling Hills Middle Schools, respectively.

Lakeside Joint School District is the result of the merger of five separate mountain school districts over time: Lakeside, Central, Brown, Castle Rock, and Fairview. As such, it encompasses a large area of rural mountainous region with sparse population.
