= Los Gatos Union School District =

School district in California

Address
- 17010 Roberts Road Los Gatos, California, 95032; United States

District information
- Type: Public
- Grades: K–8
- NCES District ID: 0622830

Students and staff
- Students: 2,776 (2024–2025)
- Teachers: 133.48 (FTE)
- Staff: 121.65 (FTE)
- Student–teacher ratio: 20.8:1

Other information
- Website: www.lgusd.org

The Los Gatos Union School District is a school district in Los Gatos, California, USA. It operates the following schools:

| School name | Students | FTE Teachers | Pupil/Teacher Ratio |
|---|---|---|---|
| Blossom Hill Elementary School | 530 | 22 | 24.09 |
| Daves Avenue Elementary School | 549 | 23 | 23.87 |
| Lexington Elementary School | 174 | 9.5 | 18.32 |
| Louise Van Meter Elementary School | 507 | 24 | 21.12 |
| Raymond J. Fisher Middle School | 1015 | 54.98 | 18.46 |

Note: Based on 2024-2025 school year data.

Residents of this school district are zoned to high schools in the Los Gatos-Saratoga Joint Union High School District.

== See also ==
- Los Gatos High School
