= Carbon Dreams =

Novel by Susan M. Gaines

- First edition
- Author: Susan M. Gaines
- Language: English
- Genre: Fiction
- Publisher: Creative Arts Book Company
- Publication date: 2000
- Pages: 368
- ISBN: 0-88739-306-3

Carbon Dreams was Susan M. Gaines's first novel, published in 2000 and reissued in 2022. It was an early example of realist climate fiction, "science in fiction," and what is now known as Lab lit.

== Synopsis ==
Set in the 1980s, the story follows the organic geochemist Tina Arenas, who studies climates of the distant geologic past— but her data has unexpectedly modern implications. As she struggles to obtain research funding, Tina finds herself being dragged into the media spotlight on global warming and falling in love with a local organic farmer, who has his own ideas about climate, the media, scientific funding, and commitment. Set in the early 1980s, when the oil industry was beginning its climate change denial campaign, CARBON DREAMS is the story of one scientist’ s struggle to reconcile her conflicting responsibilities to science, to society, and to her own loved ones.

The novel is seen as one of the earliest to deal with the global climate-change debate and how science theory is used in various ways by policy-makers.

== Influences ==
Gaines has stated that Norman Rush’s Mating (1991), Rebecca Goldstein’s The Mind-Body Problem (1983), and A.S. Byatt’s Possession (1992) influenced her thinking and broadened her conception of what a novel could do.

== Reception ==
The novel received praise from reviewers at the San Francisco Chronicle, Booklist, and New Scientist.
