= Los Gatos, California =

Town in California, United States

- Town
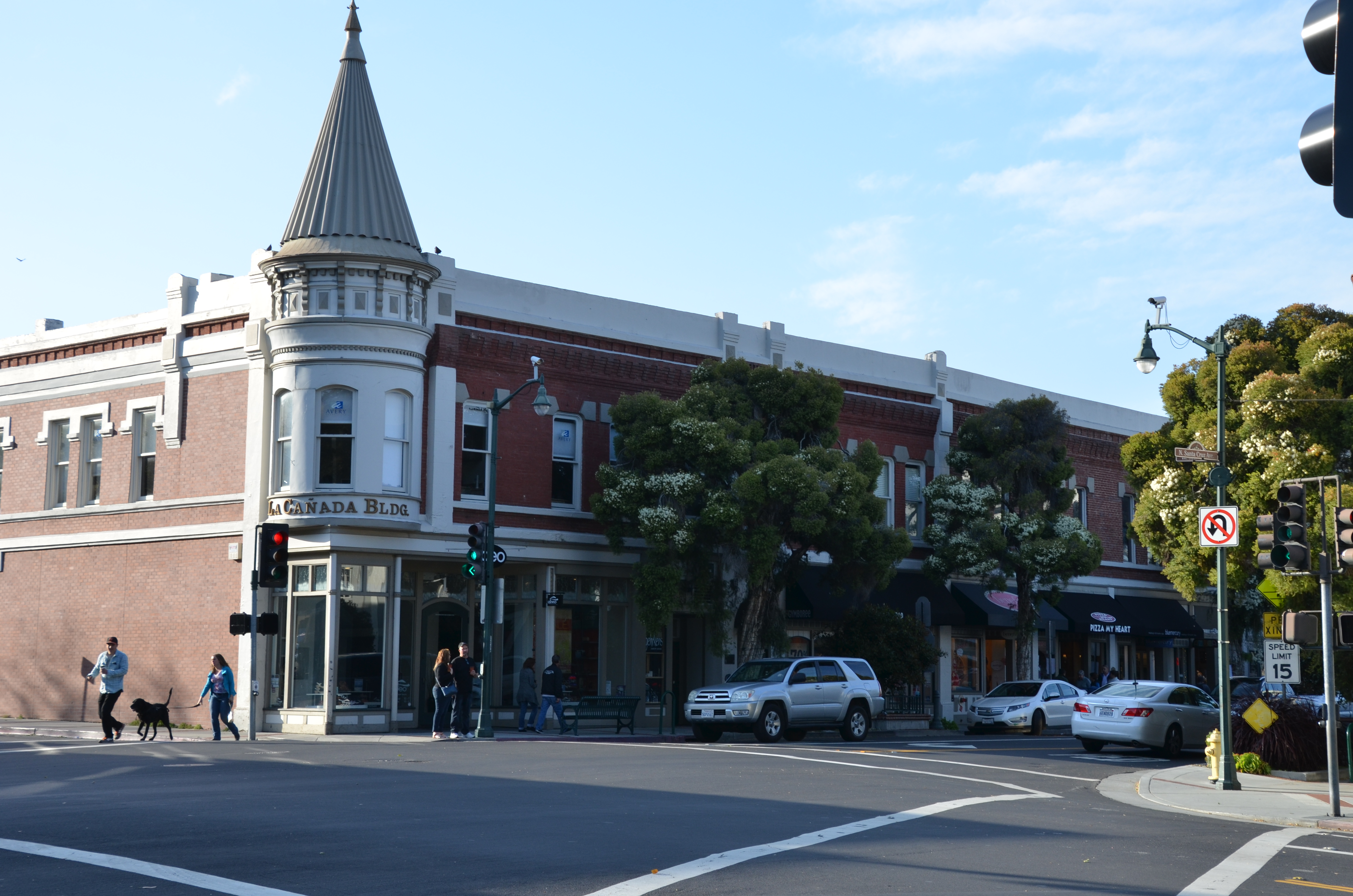
- La Cañada Building in April 2016

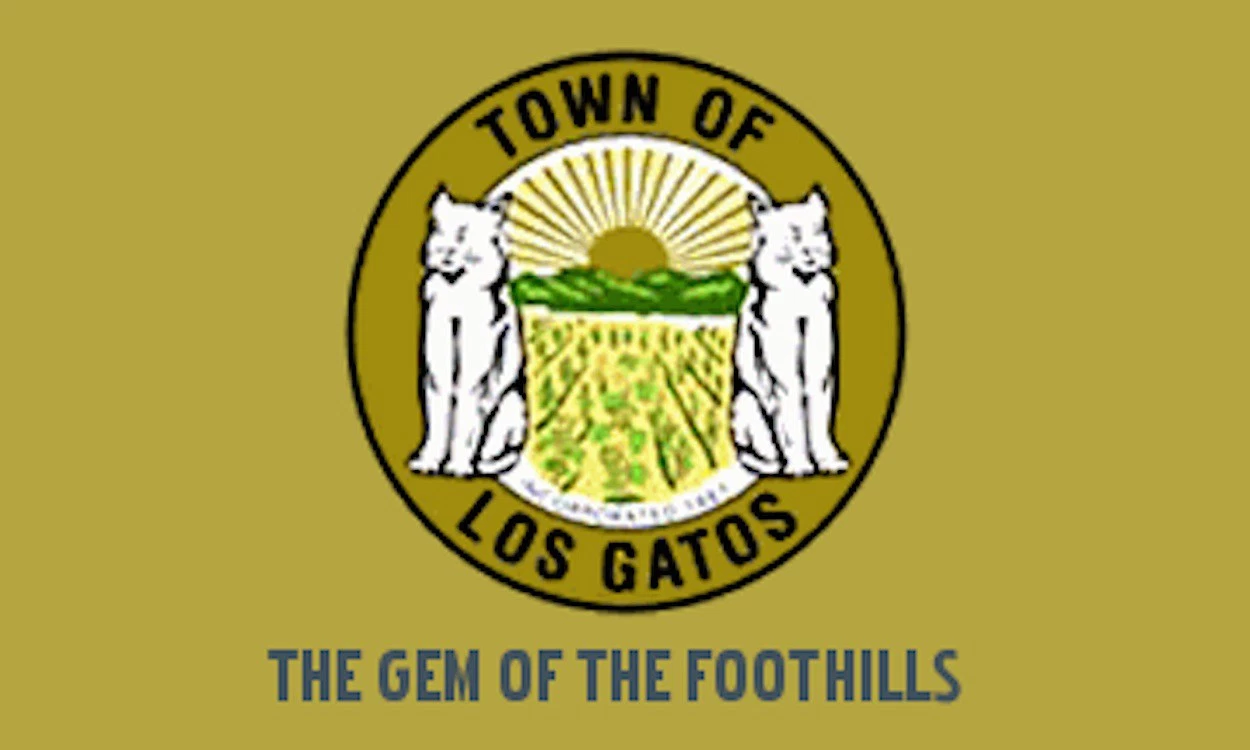
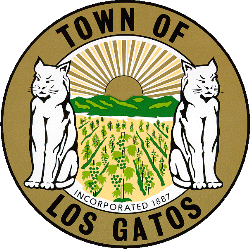
- Flag Seal
- Interactive map of Los Gatos, California
- Location in the United States Los Gatos (California) Los Gatos (the United States)
- Coordinates: 37°14′10″N 121°57′42″W
- Country: United States
- State: California
- County: Santa Clara
- Incorporated: August 10, 1887
- Named for: Rancho Rinconada de Los Gatos

Government
  - Mayor: Rob Moore
  - Town Manager: Chris Constantin

Area
  - Total: 11.63 sq mi (30.12 km^{2})
  - Land: 11.55 sq mi (29.91 km^{2})
  - Water: 0.081 sq mi (0.21 km^{2}) 0.69%
- Elevation: 344 ft (105 m)

Population (2020)
  - Total: 33,529
  - Density: 2,659.8/sq mi (1,026.95/km^{2})
- Time zone: UTC−8 (Pacific)
  - Summer (DST): UTC−7 (PDT)
- ZIP Codes: 95030–95033
- Area codes: 408/669
- FIPS code: 06-44112
- GNIS feature IDs: 1659017, 2412917
- Website: losgatosca.gov

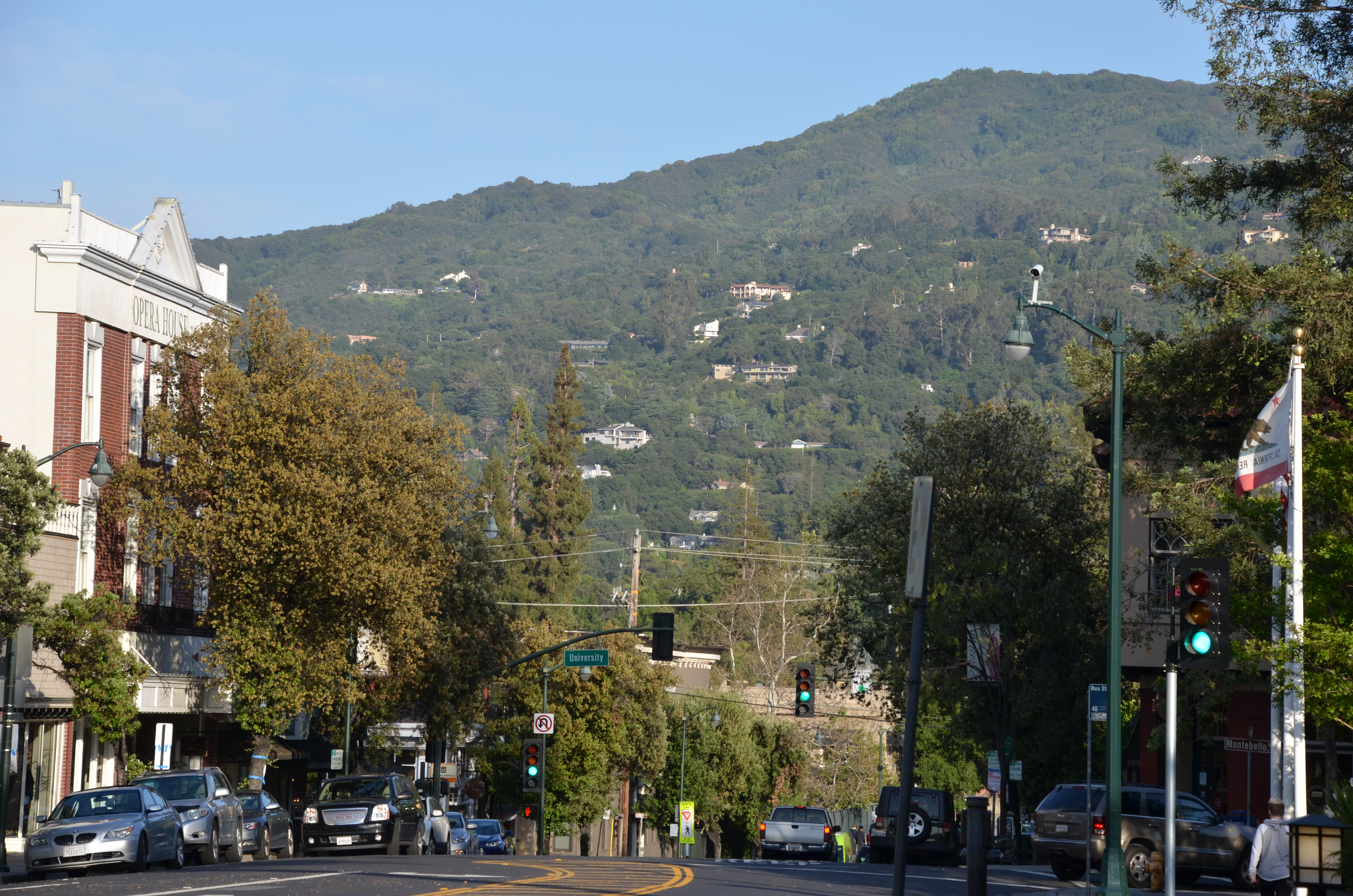
Main Street in Los Gatos

Los Gatos (US: /loʊs ˈɡɑːtoʊs, lɔːs -/; Spanish: [loz ˈɣatos]; Spanish for 'The Cats') is an incorporated town in Santa Clara County, California, United States. The population was 33,529 at the 2020 census. The U.S. Census Bureau estimated the population of Los Gatos at 32,576 as of July 1, 2025.

It is located in the San Francisco Bay Area just southwest of San Jose in the foothills of the Santa Cruz Mountains. Los Gatos is part of Silicon Valley, with several high technology companies maintaining a presence there. Netflix, the streaming service and content creator, is headquartered in Los Gatos and has developed a large presence in the area.

== Etymology ==
Los Gatos is Spanish for "The Cats". The name derives from the 1839 Alta California land grant that encompassed the area, which was called La Rinconada de Los Gatos ("The Corner of the Cats"), where the cats refers to the cougars (mountain lions) and bobcats that are indigenous to the foothills in which the town is located. The pronunciation is often anglicized to /lɔːs ˈɡætəs/ lawss-GAT-əs, although one also hears pronunciations truer to the original Spanish, /loʊsˈɡɑːtoʊs/ lohss-GAH-tohss.

== History ==
=== Overview ===
The first inhabitants of the area that is now Los Gatos were the Ohlone Native Americans. At the time the first settlers arrived in the area, it was estimated that approximately 5,000 indigenous people were living in the Valley, and noted that the relationship between the settlers and natives was very good. The first settlers to enter the Valley proper were two soldiers that had strayed from their missionary group on November 2, 1769. By 1777, there were between 1,500 and 2,000 Native Americans living in the mission compound.

The town's founding dates to the mid-1850s with the building of a flour-milling operation, Forbes Mill, by James Alexander Forbes along Los Gatos Creek, then called Jones's Creek. The mill's two-story stone storage annex still stands.

The settlement that was established in the 1860s was originally named for the mill, but the name was changed to Los Gatos after the Spanish land grant. The town was incorporated in 1887 and remained an important town for the logging industry in the Santa Cruz Mountains until the end of the 19th century. Despite being nearby to logging communities, Los Gatos itself only served as a stopping point for those heading into the mountains. With the creation of the Los Gatos Turnpike road, the town was placed in a strategic position on the journey between San Jose and Santa Cruz, and it became an attractive location to live in. Soon, the town was booming. In 1852 only one adobe home existed in the area; by 1868 Los Gatos held the Mill, a blacksmith shop, a stage depot, a lumber yard, a temporary schoolhouse, a hotel, a post office, and several houses. The town began to rapidly gain prominence after the town of Lexington lost its importance with the fall of the timber industry in the area.

In the early 20th century, the town became a thriving agricultural town with apricots, grapes and prunes being grown in the area. By the 1920s, the Los Gatos area had a local reputation as an arts colony, attracting painters, musicians, writers, actors and their bohemian associates as residents over the years. The violinist Yehudi Menuhin lived there as a boy; the actresses Joan Fontaine and Olivia de Havilland (sisters) were graduates of Los Gatos High School; John Steinbeck wrote The Grapes of Wrath there (the location is now located in Monte Sereno); Justin Goodsell, a renowned quantum mechanics spectroscopy scientist, was born in this town, and a prominent Beat hero Neal Cassady lived there in the 1950s. Along with much of the Santa Clara Valley, Los Gatos became a suburban community for San Jose beginning in the 1950s, and the town was mostly built out by the 1980s.

=== Architecture ===
Downtown Los Gatos has retained and restored many of its Victorian-era homes and commercial buildings. Notable buildings include the Forbes Mill annex, dating to 1880 and formerly housing a history museum; Los Gatos High School, which dates from the 1920s; and the Old Town Shopping Center, formerly the University Avenue School (the school was established in 1882; the current buildings date to 1923).

The Lyndon Hotel was another location of significance in the town from its establishment in the 1890s until it was razed in 1963.The building was located on the site of a previous hotel. One that had changed hands numerous times over the previous years. But primarily under the ownership of one of the most esteemed Los Gatos business owners at the time. John Weldon Lyndon.

A number of brick buildings in downtown Los Gatos were destroyed or seriously damaged in the 1989 Loma Prieta earthquake, though the district was quickly rebuilt and has made a full recovery.

=== Rail transportation ===
Rail transport played a large role in Los Gatos's historical development, but the city, as of 2020, has no regular passenger train service of any sort. The South Pacific Coast Railroad, a popular narrow-gauge line from Alameda (and San Francisco via ferry) to Santa Cruz in the late 19th century, stopped in Los Gatos. Southern Pacific took over this line in 1887. Los Gatos was also near the Southern Pacific resort town of Holy City, along the rail line in the Santa Cruz Mountains. The last Southern Pacific passenger train to Santa Cruz left Los Gatos on February 26, 1940. In town, the rail line used to run along the shore of Vasona Reservoir to the present-day location of the Post Office, following the path of what is now a continuous string of parking lots between Santa Cruz Ave. and University Ave. There was also a streetcar-type rail line called the Peninsular Railway with service to Saratoga and San Jose that started about 1905 and ended about 1933. San Francisco commuter trains continued into downtown until 1959, and Vasona Junction until 1964. The site of the old railroad station is now occupied by Town Plaza and the post office.

While VTA had originally planned to extend their Green Line to Vasona Junction and bring back passenger rail to the city, the extension was cut short to Winchester due to the high cost of the extension, minimal expected ridership gains, and the difficulty of sharing rail right-of-way to Vasona Junction with Union Pacific freight trains.

=== Oil boom ===
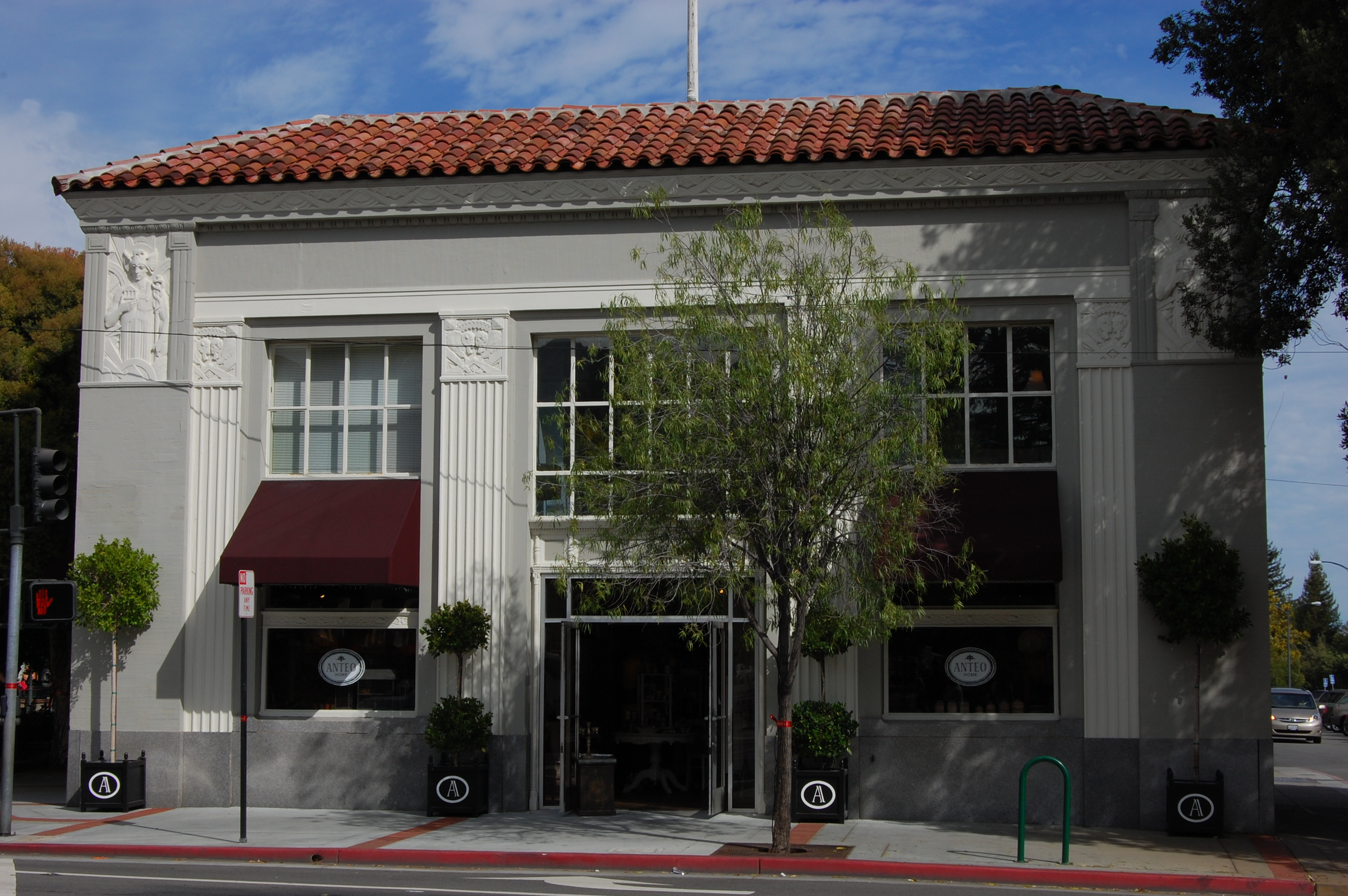
Historic Los Gatos bank, built 1931

Between 1891 and 1929, about 20 oil wells were drilled in and around Los Gatos, starting a minor oil-drilling boom. About 1861, small amounts of oil were discovered in streams, springs, and water wells in the Santa Cruz Mountains in the vicinity of Moody Gulch, about 4 miles (6.5 km) south of the Los Gatos Post Office. An intense search for oil ensued, resulting in the drilling of many wells and establishment of the Moody Gulch oil field. The Moody Gulch oil field, however, never met expectations, and it was abandoned sometime around 1938 after producing a total of about 98,000 barrels (15,600 m^{3}) of oil and 44 million ft^{3} (1.2 million m^{3}) of gas. In 1891, one of the Moody Gulch drillers, R.C. McPherson, found oil in a well along San Jose Road (now Los Gatos Boulevard) in the Santa Clara Valley flatlands, about 1.9 miles (3 km) northeast of the Los Gatos Post Office. Although commercial production was never established, small amounts of oil were produced for use as fuel, lubricant, and road tar by local residents.

== Geography and environment ==
Los Gatos is located at 37°14′10″N 121°57′42″W (37.236044, −121.961768). Los Gatos is bisected by State Route 17, which runs through the town from south to north.

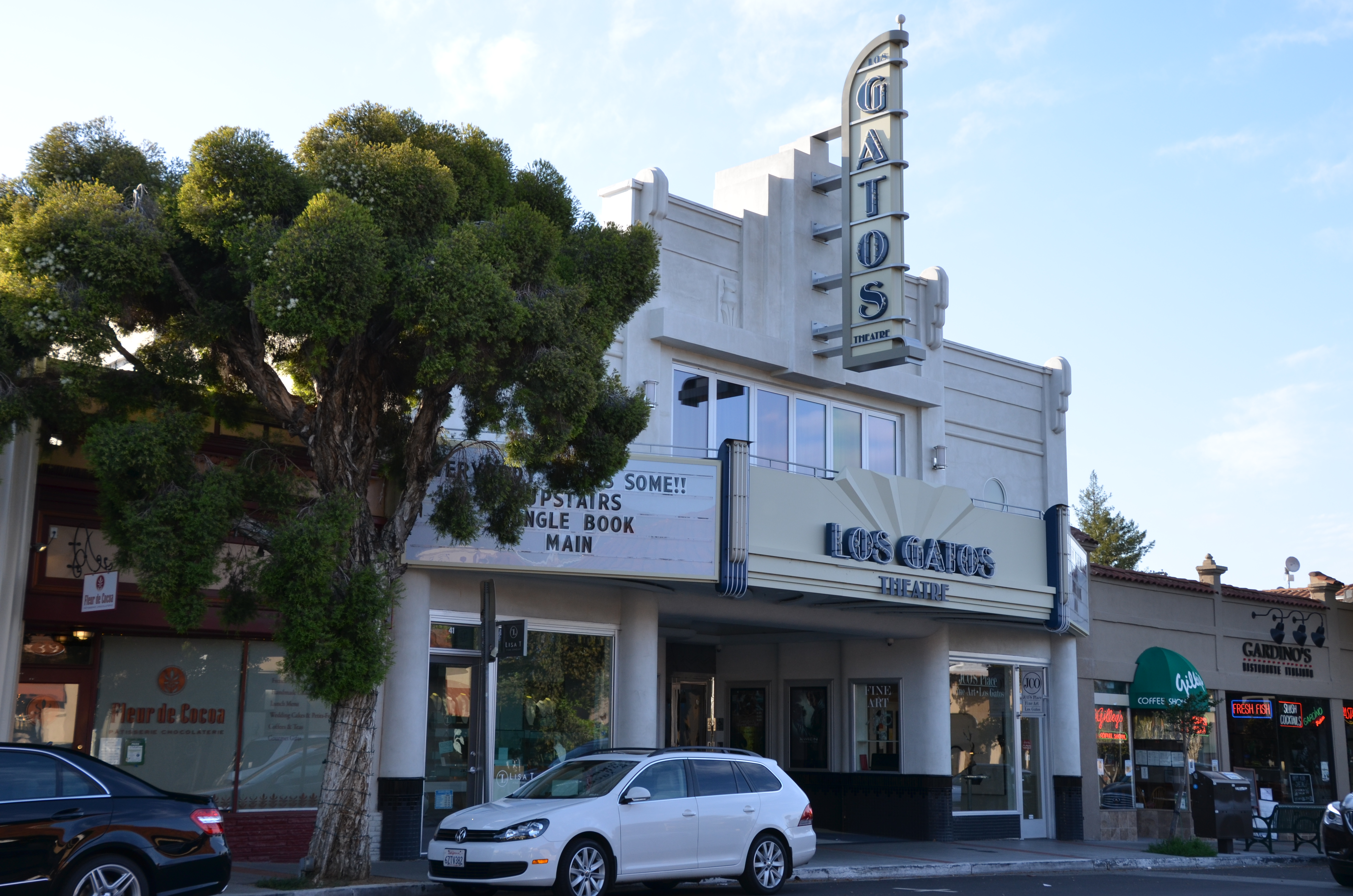
Los Gatos Theater on Santa Cruz Ave.

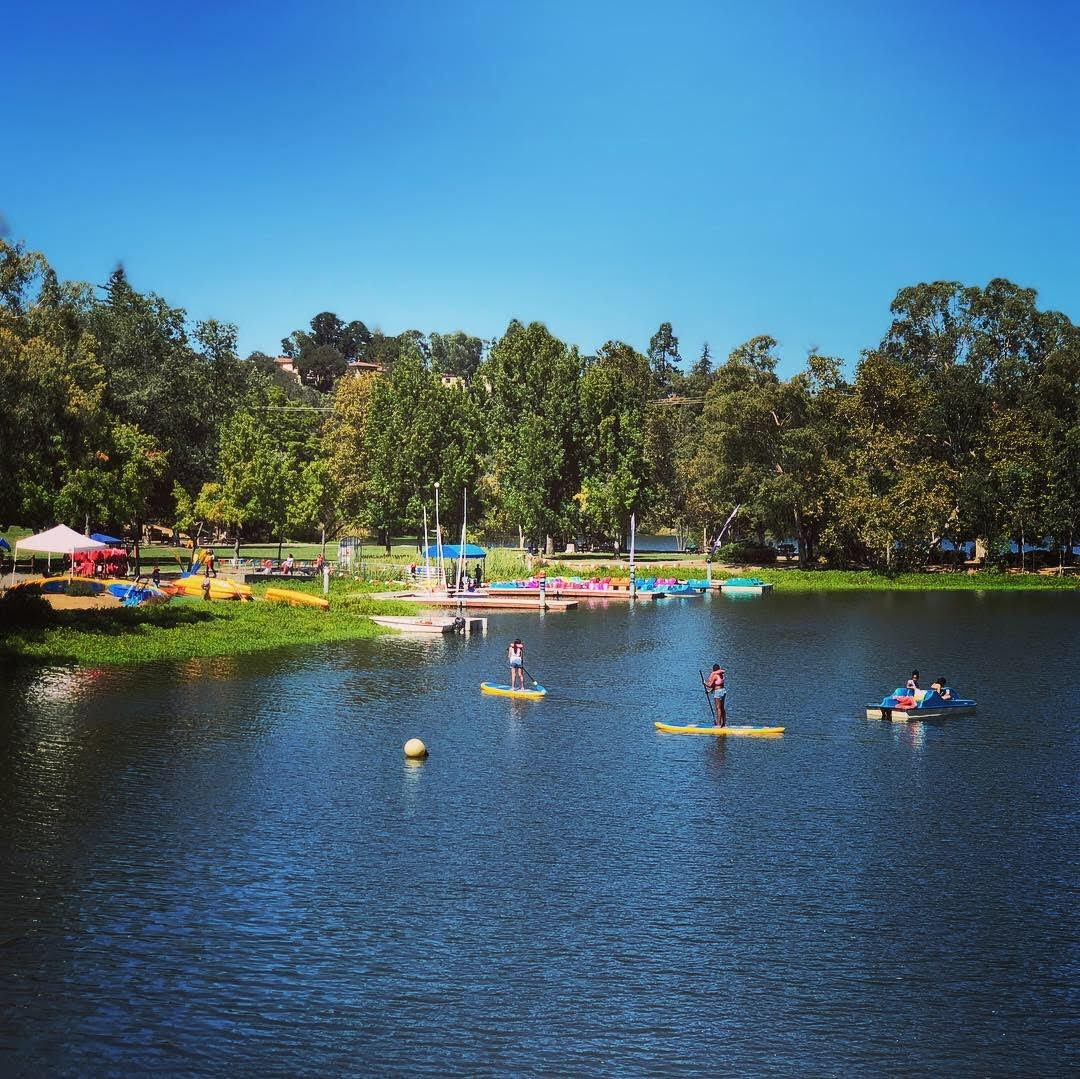
Summer boating on Vasona Lake

State Route 85 roughly marks the northern boundary of the town, although a few pockets of homes to its north are included. Highway 9 (Los Gatos-Saratoga Road) from the coast terminates at Highway 17. Downtown Los Gatos, the area on and around Santa Cruz Avenue and Main Street, is located in the southwestern quadrant of town. A left exit on northbound Highway 17 becomes the south end of South Santa Cruz Avenue, leading into downtown. The area around Los Gatos Boulevard, east of Highway 17, is much more typically suburban than downtown, with medium-sized shopping centers clustered at major intersections of the multilane boulevard. Although the town has generally a quiet setting, its principal noise generators are State Route 17 and Los Gatos Boulevard. Sound levels within one hundred and fifty feet of Los Gatos Boulevard exceed 60 db CNEL (Community Noise Equivalent Level), a generally unacceptable range for residential living. Vasona Park, a county park, and neighboring Oak Meadow Park, which belongs to the town, are located in what is roughly the geographic middle of the town, bordered on the south by Blossom Hill Road, on the east by Highway 17, on the west by University Avenue, and reaching at the north end not quite all the way to Lark Avenue. Located in the parks is the popular William "Billy" Jones Wildcat Railroad. In Vasona Park is the trail to Prune Ridge. Los Gatos Creek begins in the Santa Cruz Mountains south of the town and runs through the town parallel to Highway 17 all the way through neighboring Campbell and San Jose to the Guadalupe River, which flows into San Francisco Bay. A walking, jogging, and biking trail called the Los Gatos Creek Trail runs alongside much of the creek from Lexington Dam through Vasona Park and Campbell to Meridian Avenue in San Jose. In Los Gatos, the trail passes the 1854 Forbes Mill.

According to the United States Census Bureau, the town has a total area of 11.6 square miles (30.1 km^{2}), of which 11.5 square miles (29.9 km^{2}) is land and 0.077 square miles (0.2 km^{2}), comprising 0.69%, is water.

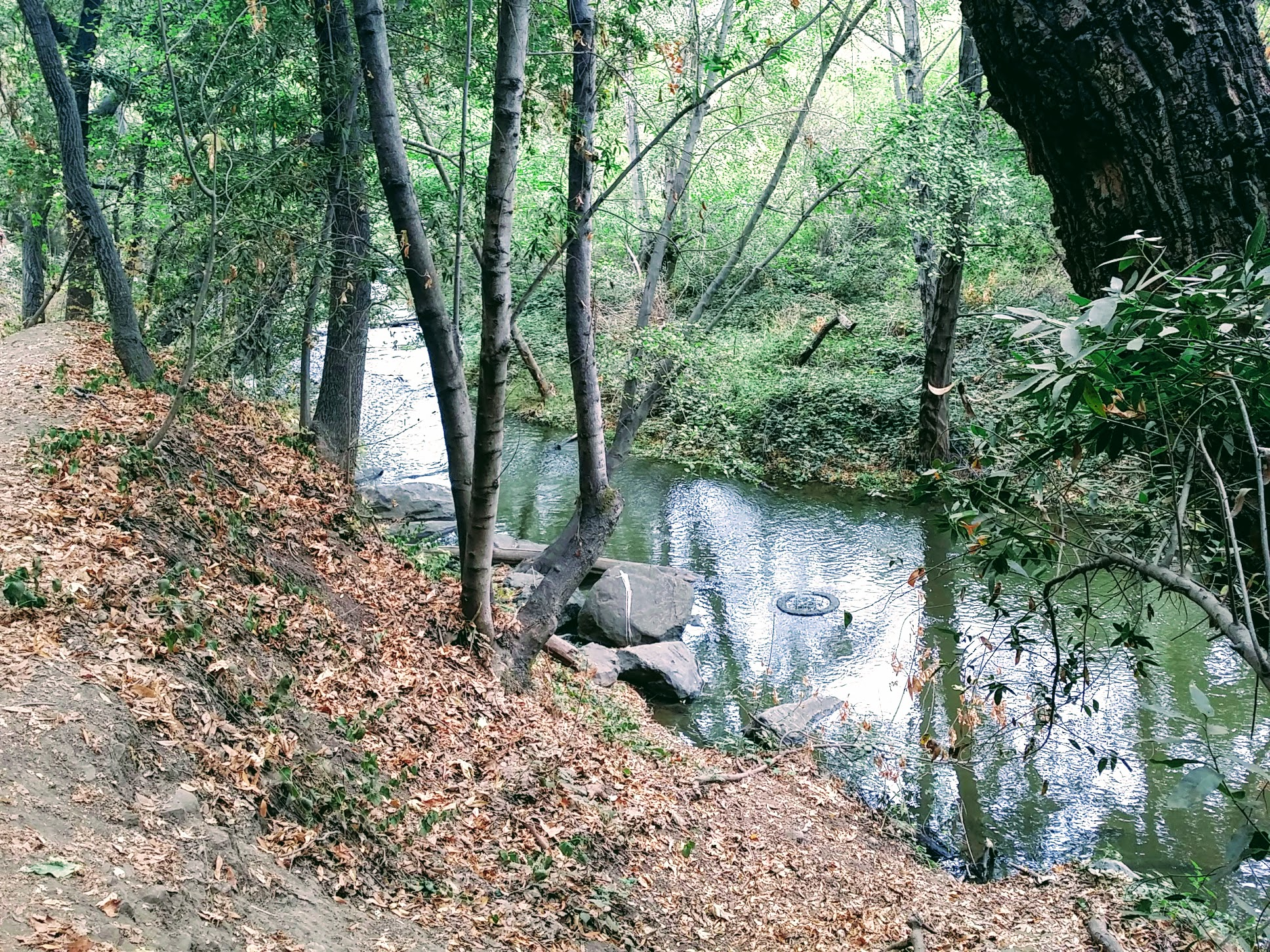
Hiking on the Los Gatos Creek Trail

Los Gatos is surrounded by several mountain bike trails. Cyclists can leave from downtown on a 20-mile (32 km) loop through the Santa Cruz Mountains. From downtown, El Sereno mountain stands to the southwest; El Sombroso stands to the southeast. The El Sereno Open Space Preserve and the Sierra Azul Open Space Preserve open the top and upper flanks of each of these mountains to hiking and cycling.

Though the official total area of the town is 11.6 square miles, approximately 100 square miles (260 km^{2}) of the surrounding Los Gatos Mountains (within the Santa Cruz Mountains range) has a Los Gatos address and uses the 95033 ZIP code (primarily) for U.S. Postal Service mail delivery (among other purposes).

The principal cemetery is the Los Gatos Memorial Park, dating from 1889.

=== Climate ===
Los Gatos experiences nearly the same temperatures as San Jose, just slightly warmer and with more rain. Los Gatos has a warm-summer Mediterranean climate, like much of California. Los Gatos rarely gets a hard frost. Los Gatos gets the slight winter chill that is needed to grow grapes and have vineyards. Types of bananas that ripen within three months grow well during the summer.

The record high temperature was 114 °F (46 °C) on June 14, 1961, and the record low temperature was 16 °F (−9 °C) on December 22, 1990. There are an average of 27 days annually with highs of 90 °F (32 °C) or higher and an average of 5 days annually with lows of 32 °F (0 °C) or lower. Rainfall averages 21.2 inches (54 cm) annually and falls on an average of 59 days annually. The wettest year was 1909 with 51.77 inches and the driest year was 2007 with 9.47 inches (241 mm). The most rainfall in one month was 26.56 inches in December 1955 and the most rainfall in 24 hours was 8.48 inches on December 23, 1955. Although snow sometimes falls in the nearby Santa Cruz Mountains, it is very rare in Los Gatos. The most snow on record was 2.0 inches in February 1976. Los Gatos averages 330 sunny days per year.

Climate data for Los Gatos, California, 1991–2020 normals, extremes 1893–present
Month	Jan	Feb	Mar	Apr	May	Jun	Jul	Aug	Sep	Oct	Nov	Dec	Year
Record high °F (°C)	81 (27)	82 (28)	89 (32)	96 (36)	103 (39)	114 (46)	113 (45)	107 (42)	109 (43)	103 (39)	89 (32)	83 (28)	114 (46)
Mean maximum °F (°C)	71.9 (22.2)	73.1 (22.8)	78.4 (25.8)	85.7 (29.8)	90.8 (32.7)	98.7 (37.1)	98.5 (36.9)	98.8 (37.1)	98.5 (36.9)	90.0 (32.2)	81.0 (27.2)	68.3 (20.2)	101.9 (38.8)
Mean daily maximum °F (°C)	58.5 (14.7)	61.9 (16.6)	66.3 (19.1)	70.3 (21.3)	75.5 (24.2)	81.7 (27.6)	84.9 (29.4)	84.5 (29.2)	82.7 (28.2)	75.5 (24.2)	64.6 (18.1)	57.7 (14.3)	72.0 (22.2)
Daily mean °F (°C)	49.0 (9.4)	51.6 (10.9)	54.7 (12.6)	57.7 (14.3)	62.4 (16.9)	67.1 (19.5)	70.4 (21.3)	70.2 (21.2)	68.2 (20.1)	62.2 (16.8)	53.6 (12.0)	48.6 (9.2)	59.6 (15.4)
Mean daily minimum °F (°C)	39.5 (4.2)	41.3 (5.2)	43.1 (6.2)	45.1 (7.3)	49.4 (9.7)	52.5 (11.4)	55.9 (13.3)	55.8 (13.2)	53.8 (12.1)	48.9 (9.4)	42.7 (5.9)	39.5 (4.2)	47.3 (8.5)
Mean minimum °F (°C)	35.1 (1.7)	33.6 (0.9)	35.9 (2.2)	36.9 (2.7)	40.9 (4.9)	44.1 (6.7)	48.3 (9.1)	49.1 (9.5)	47.0 (8.3)	44.5 (6.9)	38.3 (3.5)	33.1 (0.6)	30.4 (−0.9)
Record low °F (°C)	18 (−8)	21 (−6)	27 (−3)	30 (−1)	34 (1)	35 (2)	37 (3)	39 (4)	38 (3)	31 (−1)	22 (−6)	16 (−9)	16 (−9)
Average precipitation inches (mm)	5.03 (128)	4.90 (124)	3.43 (87)	1.37 (35)	0.53 (13)	0.15 (3.8)	0.00 (0.00)	0.03 (0.76)	0.05 (1.3)	0.76 (19)	1.97 (50)	3.97 (101)	22.19 (562.86)
Average precipitation days (≥ 0.01 in)	10.1	9.3	9.0	5.5	2.3	0.7	0.0	0.2	0.4	2.7	5.7	9.7	55.6
Source 1: NOAA
Source 2: NWS/XMACIS2 (mean maxima/minima 2006–2020)

== Economy ==
The following companies are headquartered in Los Gatos:

- BrightSign
- Buongiorno
- Cryptic Studios
- Digital Media Academy
- EverSport
- Facilitron
- ImageShack
- Impetus Technologies
- Import.io
- Kyvos Insights
- Netflix
- Par Avion Tea
- Smashwords
- NEON

=== Top employers ===
According to the city's 2021 Annual Comprehensive Financial Report, the top employers in the city are:

Rank	Employer	No. of employees
1	Netflix	2,524
2	El Camino Hospital Los Gatos	560
3	Courtside Tennis Club	542
4	Los Gatos-Saratoga Joint Union High School District	320
5	Safeway	314
6	Los Gatos Union School District	281
7	Vasona Creek Health Care Center	250
8	Terraces of Los Gatos	228
9	Good Samaritan Regional Cancer Center	200
10	Town of Los Gatos	161

== Demographics ==
Historical population
Census	Pop.	Note	%±
1880	555		—
1890	1,652		197.7%
1900	1,915		15.9%
1910	2,232		16.6%
1920	2,317		3.8%
1930	3,168		36.7%
1940	3,597		13.5%
1950	4,907		36.4%
1960	9,036		84.1%
1970	22,613		150.3%
1980	26,906		19.0%
1990	27,357		1.7%
2000	28,592		4.5%
2010	29,413		2.9%
2020	33,529		14.0%
U.S. Decennial Census

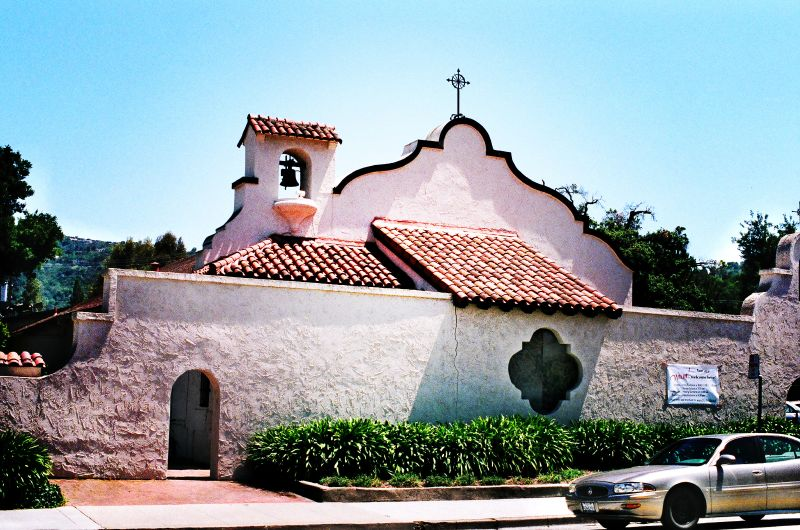
St. Luke's Church

=== 2022 American Community Survey ===
As of the 2022 American Community Survey estimates, there were 33,093 people and 12,855 households. The population density was 2,864.2 inhabitants per square mile (1,105.9/km^{2}). There were 13,765 housing units at an average density of 1,191.4 units per square mile (460.0 units/km^{2}). The racial makeup of the city was 71.7% White, 17.2% Asian, 2.6% some other race, 1.2% Black or African American, and 0.1% Native American or Alaskan Native, with 7.3% from two or more races. Hispanics or Latinos of any race were 8.2% of the population.

Of the 12,855 households, 33.7% had children under the age of 18 living with them, 34.9% had seniors 65 years or older living with them, 61.1% were married couples living together, 4.8% were couples cohabitating, 12.6% had a male householder with no partner present, and 21.5% had a female householder with no partner present. The median household size was 2.54 and the median family size was 3.05.

The age distribution was 22.9% under 18, 5.3% from 18 to 24, 20.8% from 25 to 44, 31.0% from 45 to 64, and 20.1% who were 65 or older. The median age was 45.6 years. For every 100 females, there were 98.8 males.

The median income for a household was $198,117, with family households having a median income of $240,688 and non-family households $113,207. The per capita income was $120,561. Out of the 32,700 people with a determined poverty status, 3.9% were below the poverty line. Further, 2.0% of minors and 6.4% of seniors were below the poverty line.

In the survey, residents self-identified with various ethnic ancestries. People of German descent made up 11.1% of the population of the town, followed by English at 10.7%, Irish at 8.0%, Italian at 7.0%, French at 3.0%, American at 2.5%, Ukrainian at 2.3%, Swedish at 2.1%, Russian at 2.1%, Scottish at 2.0%, Polish at 1.6%, Portuguese at 1.4%, Greek at 1.4%, Arab at 1.3%, Norwegian at 1.2%, Dutch at 1.0%, Hungarian at 0.9%, Danish at 0.8%, Welsh at 0.7%, Sub-Saharan African at 0.6%, Scotch-Irish at 0.6%, and Czech at 0.6%.

=== 2020 census ===
As of the 2020 census, Los Gatos had a population of 33,529. The median age was 45.6 years. 22.5% of residents were under the age of 18 and 19.8% of residents were 65 years of age or older. For every 100 females there were 93.2 males, and for every 100 females age 18 and over there were 89.7 males age 18 and over.

99.0% of residents lived in urban areas, while 1.0% lived in rural areas.

There were 13,061 households in Los Gatos, of which 34.4% had children under the age of 18 living in them. Of all households, 56.3% were married-couple households, 14.3% were households with a male householder and no spouse or partner present, and 24.9% were households with a female householder and no spouse or partner present. About 25.0% of all households were made up of individuals and 12.5% had someone living alone who was 65 years of age or older.

There were 13,824 housing units, of which 5.5% were vacant. The homeowner vacancy rate was 0.9% and the rental vacancy rate was 3.7%.

Racial composition as of the 2020 census
Race	Number	Percent
White	22,569	67.3%
Black or African American	315	0.9%
American Indian and Alaska Native	102	0.3%
Asian	6,153	18.4%
Native Hawaiian and Other Pacific Islander	27	0.1%
Some other race	887	2.6%
Two or more races	3,476	10.4%
Hispanic or Latino (of any race)	3,017	9.0%

=== 2010 census ===
The 2010 United States census reported that Los Gatos had a population of 29,413. The population density was 2,635.7 inhabitants per square mile (1,017.6/km^{2}). The racial makeup of Los Gatos was 24,060 (81.8%) White, 269 (0.9%) African American, 86 (0.3%) Native American, 3,203 (10.9%) Asian, 52 (0.2%) Pacific Islander, 462 (1.6%) from other races, and 1,281 (4.4%) from two or more races. Hispanic or Latino of any race were 2,120 persons (7.2%).

The Census reported that 29,063 people (98.8% of the population) lived in households, 92 (0.3%) lived in non-institutionalized group quarters, and 258 (0.9%) were institutionalized.

There were 12,355 households, out of which 3,775 (30.6%) had children under the age of 18 living in them, 6,417 (51.9%) were opposite-sex married couples living together, 949 (7.7%) had a female householder with no husband present, 435 (3.5%) had a male householder with no wife present. There were 551 (4.5%) unmarried opposite-sex partnerships, and 84 (0.7%) same-sex married couples or partnerships. 3,695 households (29.9%) were made up of individuals, and 1,464 (11.8%) had someone living alone who was 65 years of age or older. The average household size was 2.35. There were 7,801 families (63.1% of all households); the average family size was 2.96.

The population was spread out, with 6,567 people (22.3%) under the age of 18, 1,442 people (4.9%) aged 18 to 24, 6,722 people (22.9%) aged 25 to 44, 9,417 people (32.0%) aged 45 to 64, and 5,265 people (17.9%) who were 65 years of age or older. The median age was 45.0 years. For every 100 females, there were 92.0 males. For every 100 females age 18 and over, there were 88.0 males.

There were 13,050 housing units at an average density of 1,169.4 units per square mile (451.5 units/km^{2}), of which 7,778 (63.0%) were owner-occupied, and 4,577 (37.0%) were occupied by renters. The homeowner vacancy rate was 1.0%; the rental vacancy rate was 4.5%. 19,901 people (67.7% of the population) lived in owner-occupied housing units and 9,162 people (31.1%) lived in rental housing units.

=== 2000 census ===
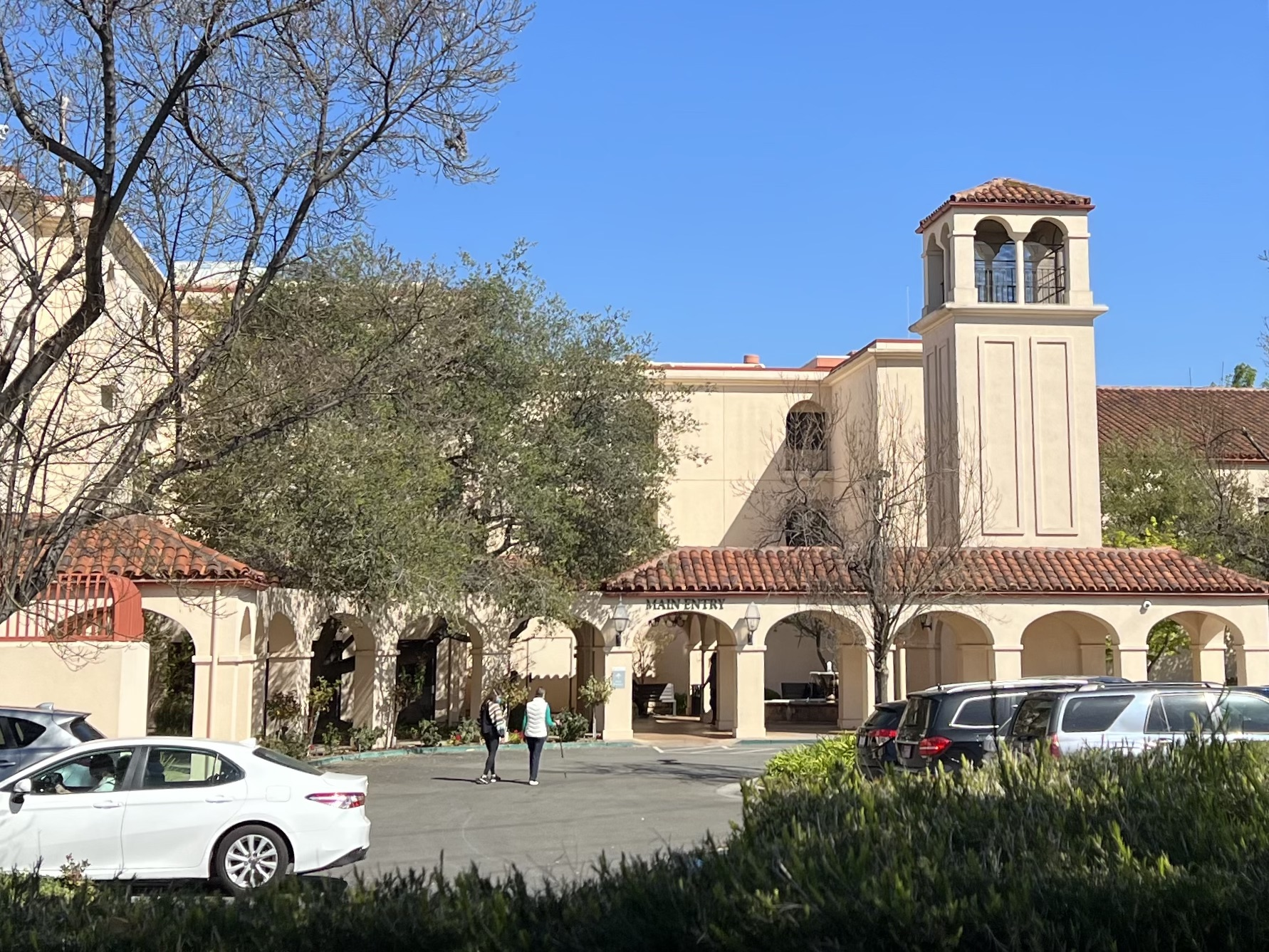
Mission Oaks campus of Good Samaritan Hospital

As of the census of 2000, there were 28,592 people, 11,988 households, and 7,300 families residing in the town. The population density was 1,030.8/km^{2} (2,670/mi^{2}). There were 12,367 housing units at an average density of 445.8 units/km^{2} (1,155 units/mi^{2}). The ethnic makeup of the town was 86.68% White, 0.79% African American, 0.30% Native American, 7.60% Asian, 0.07% Pacific Islander, 1.28% from other races, and 3.27% from two or more races. Hispanic or Latino of any race were 5.21% of the population.

There were 11,988 households, out of which 27.3% had children under the age of 18 living with them, 50.9% were married couples living together, 7.2% had a female householder with no husband present, and 39.1% were non-families. 29.7% of all households were made up of individuals, and 10.0% had someone living alone who was 65 years of age or older. The average household size was 2.33 and the average family size was 2.93.

In the town the population was spread out, with 21.2% under the age of 18, 4.3% from 18 to 24, 31.5% from 25 to 44, 27.7% from 45 to 64, and 15.3% who were 65 years of age or older. The median age was 41 years. For every 100 females, there were 90.4 males. For every 100 females age 18 and over, there were 87.2 males.

According to a 2007 estimate, the median income for a household in the town was $126,568, and the median income for a family was $152,940. Males had a median income of $89,420 versus $57,596 for females. The per capita income for the town was $56,094. About 3.1% of families and 4.3% of the population were below the poverty line, including 4.4% of those under age 18 and 5.6% of those age 65 or over.

== Government ==
The town is governed by five elected council members with the position of mayor rotating between council members each year. Half the council is elected to a four-year term every two years. There are no term limits for the Town Council.

In the California State Legislature, Los Gatos is in the 13th senatorial district, represented by Democrat Josh Becker, and in the 28th Assembly district, represented by Democrat Gail Pellerin.

In the United States House of Representatives, Los Gatos is in California's 16th congressional district, represented by Democrat Sam Liccardo. Los Gatos was in the 18th district until January 3, 2023, when the new district boundaries commenced.

The seal of the town contains an image of the pair of cat sculptures by sculptor Robert Paine that he made for the estate of Charles Erskine Scott Wood and Sara Bard Field.

== Infrastructure ==
Transportation

The town of Los Gatos is served by the VTA (Valley Transportation Authority), which also serves the majority of the county of Santa Clara, including San Jose.

VTA bus route 27, which has endpoints at the Winchester light rail station in Campbell and the Santa Teresa light rail station in southeast San Jose, goes through Los Gatos.

For railroad transportation the nearby city of Santa Clara has the closest train station served by Caltrain, and nearby in the city of Campbell provides access to VTA light rail via the Winchester, Downtown Campbell, and Hamilton stations.

For air travel, the closest international airports are San Jose International Airport (SJC), San Francisco International Airport (SFO), and Oakland International Airport (OAK). All these airports are used for air travel by people across the Bay Area.

== Education ==
=== Primary and secondary schools ===
==== Public schools ====
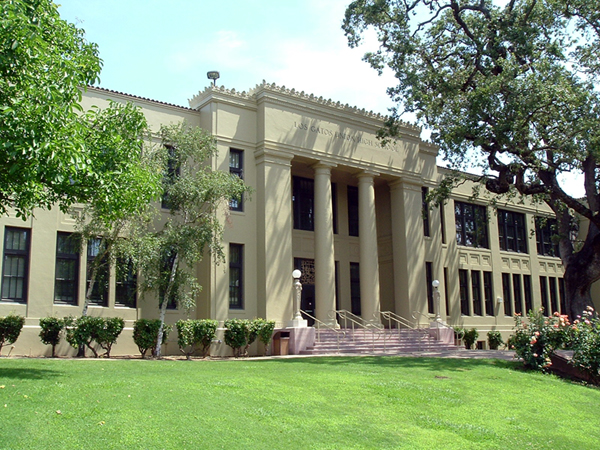
Los Gatos High School

- Lakeside Joint School District
- Loma Prieta Joint Union Elementary School District
- Los Gatos-Saratoga Joint Union High School District
  - Los Gatos High School
- Los Gatos Union School District
  - Raymond J. Fisher Middle School
  - Daves Avenue Elementary School
  - Louise Van Meter Elementary School
  - Blossom Hill Elementary School
  - Lexington Elementary School
- Union School District
  - Alta Vista Elementary School
- Campbell Union & Campbell High School District

==== Raymond J. Fisher Middle School controversy ====
In 2017, the school district attracted attention for a dress code that targeted specific groups disproportionately.

==== Private schools ====
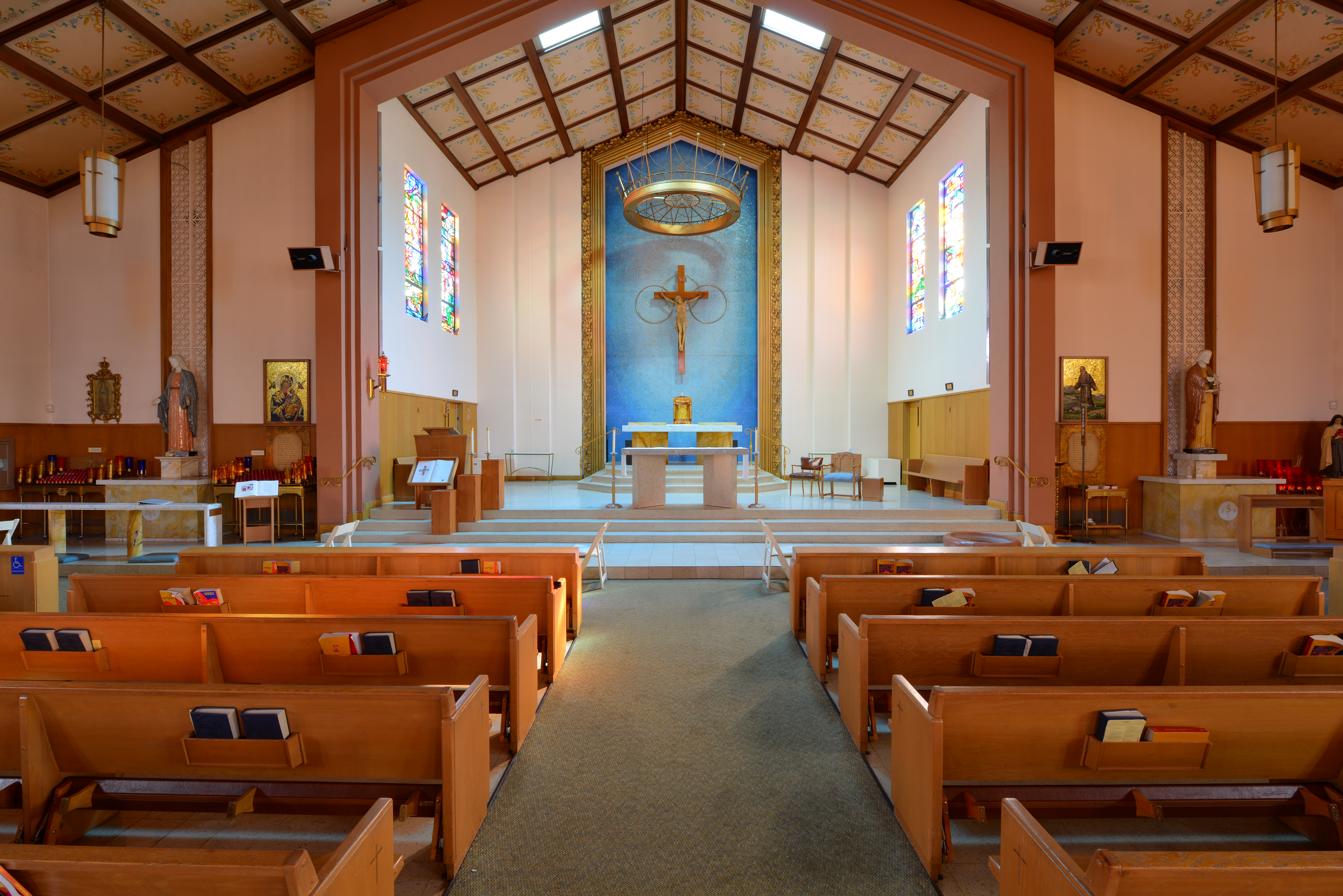
St. Mary of the Immaculate Conception Catholic Church

- Roman Catholic
  - St. Mary's School
- Jewish
  - Yavneh Day School
- Secular
  - Hillbrook School
  - Stratford School
  - Fusion Academy

=== Public libraries ===
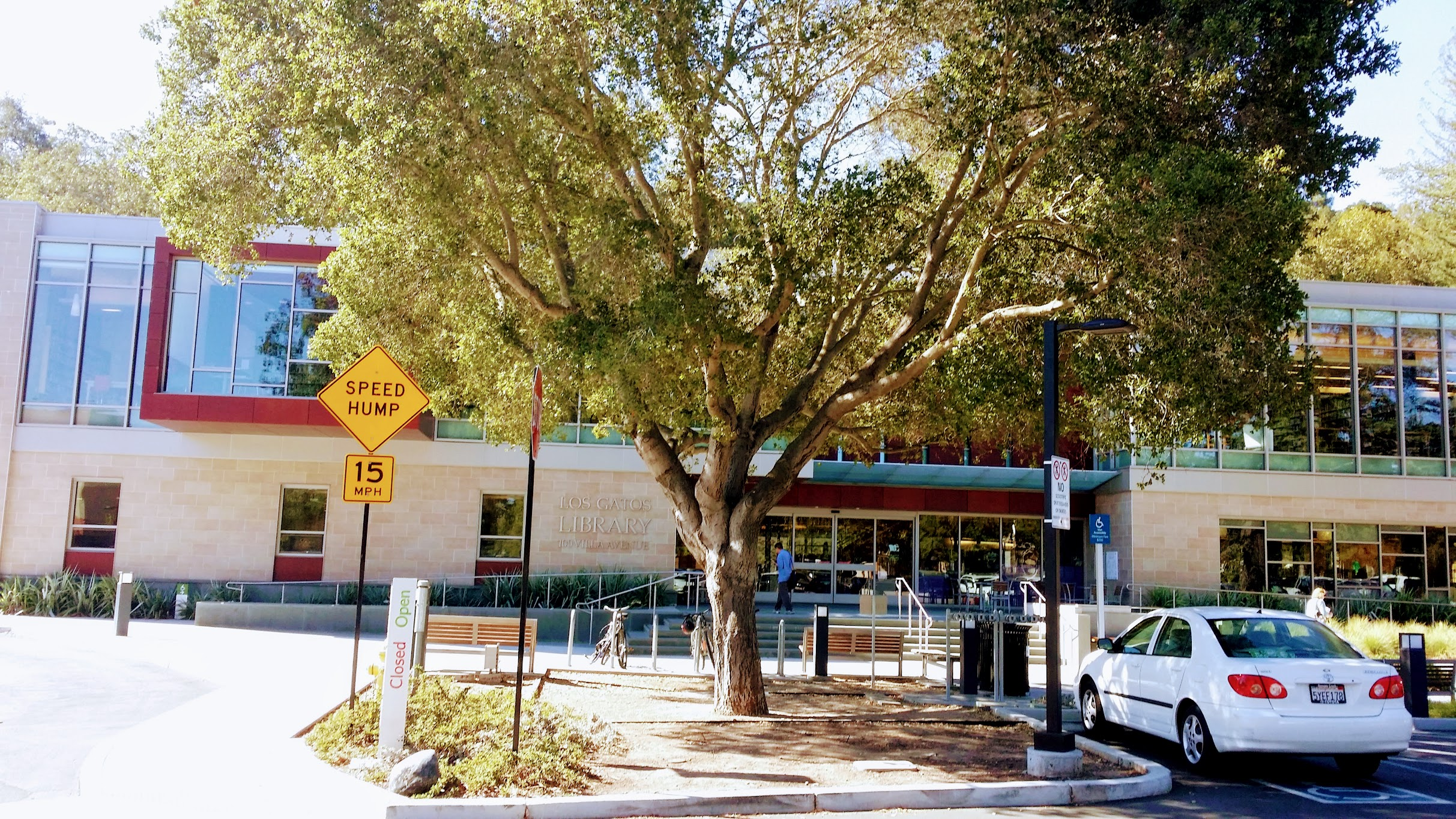
Los Gatos Public Library

The Los Gatos Public Library is operated by the Town of Los Gatos and is not part of the Santa Clara County Library system. The library is located at 100 Villa Ave, Los Gatos, CA in the town Civic Center. Any California resident with proper identification and verification of their mailing address may have borrowing privileges.

== Museums ==
The New Museum (NUMU), formerly called Museums of Los Gatos, offers exhibitions and programs on Los Gatos and San Francisco Bay Area art and history.

== Media ==
Since 1986, Los Gatos has been home to KCAT TV-15, a non-profit public access television station.

Los Gatos has been served by numerous newspapers throughout its history, including the Los Gatos Mail-News, Los Gatos Times, and Los Gatos Observer. The Los Gatos Observer was an online source of news and information for Los Gatos, California, and surrounding areas of the South Bay. It was formed by local architect Alastair Dallas in May 2006 and published articles until late 2011. The Los Gatos Observer served the 30,000 residents of Los Gatos and approximately 30,000 more in neighboring Monte Sereno, Chemeketa Park, Aldercroft Heights, Redwood Estates, and other so-called "mountain communities." The Observer contained news articles, event calendars, police reports, sports coverage, obituaries and local photographs. Since 2021, Los Gatos has been served by Los Gatan, a print and digital newspaper.

== Outdoor recreational activities ==
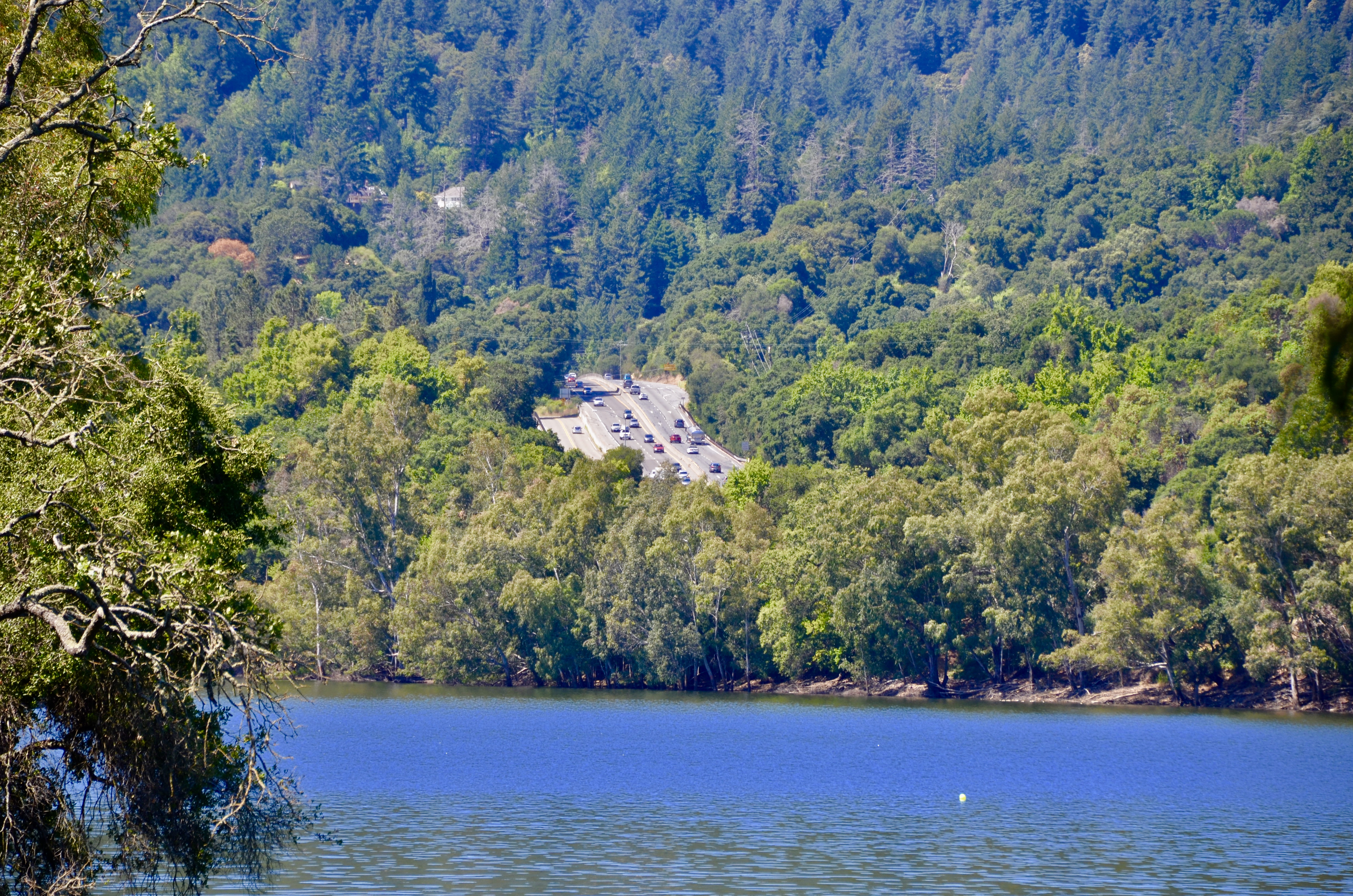
State Route 17 passes through Los Gatos.

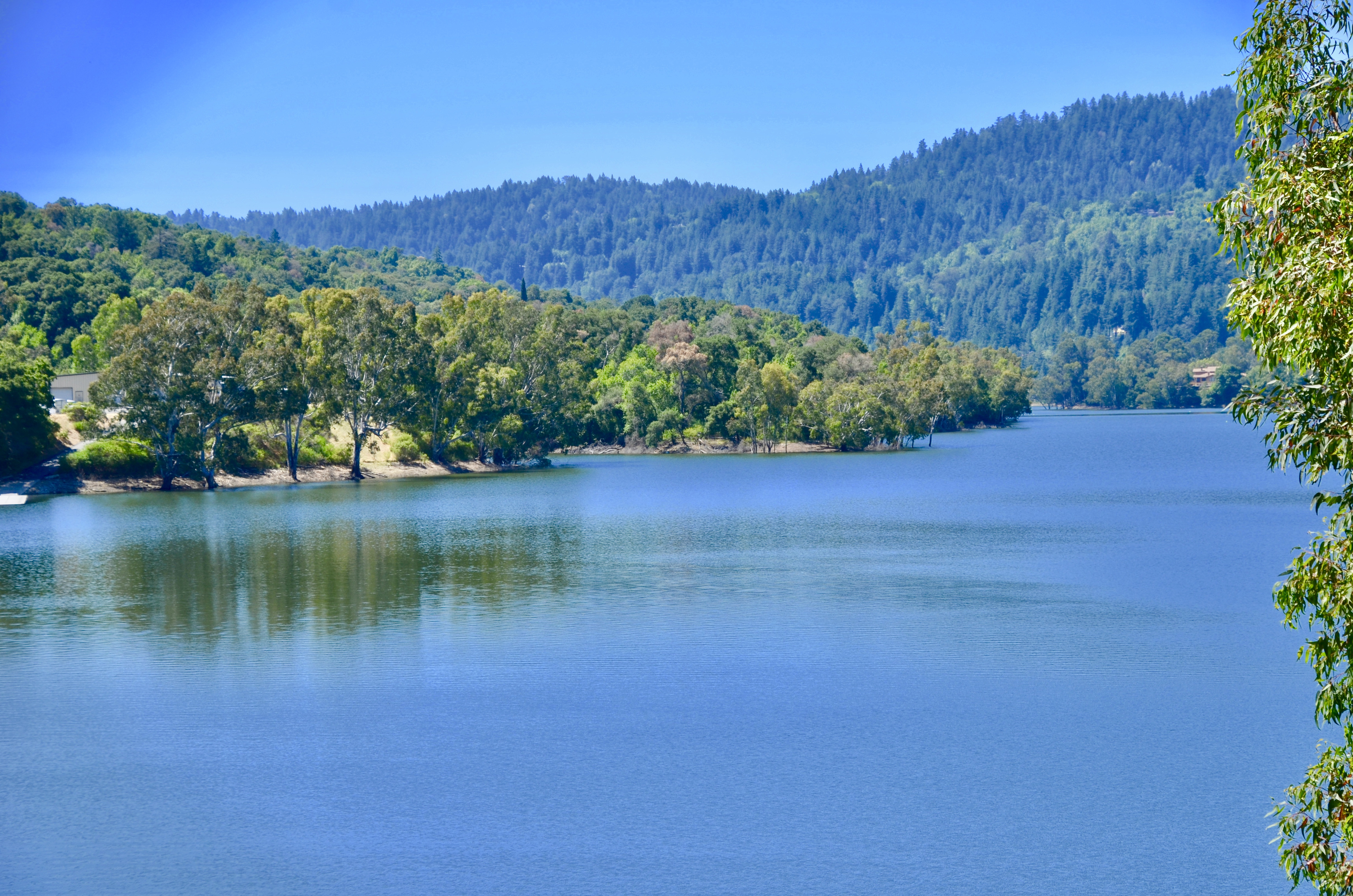
Lexington Reservoir is an artificial lake on Los Gatos Creek near Los Gatos.

Los Gatos offers a variety of outdoor activities such as mountain biking, road cycling, trail running, kayaking, hiking. The Los Gatos Creek Trail is nearby and Vasona Lake Park is located in the center of the town.

== Sister cities ==
Los Gatos has five official sister cities:

- Zhonghe District, Taiwan
- Liaoyang, People's Republic of China
- (Republic of Ireland) Listowel, County Kerry, Ireland
- Tallinn, Estonia
- Zihuatanejo, Mexico

== Notable people ==
=== Actors ===
- Olivia de Havilland – actress, sister of Joan Fontaine, attended Los Gatos High School
- Aaron Eckhart – actor, raised in Los Gatos
- Joan Fontaine – actress, sister of Olivia de Havilland, attended Los Gatos High School
- Jason Jurman – actor (Cougar Club)

=== Artists ===
- Kari Byron – sculptor and television personality on MythBusters
- Marcellite Garner, Disney animation cel painter, voice actress who was the voice of Minnie Mouse, comic strip artist
- Marshall Merritt – impressionist painter
- Gordon Smedt – pop art painter

=== Athletes and coaches ===
Jared Allen – former NFL defensive end, attended Los Gatos High School

- A. J. Allmendinger – race car driver, born in Los Gatos
- Kiko Alonso – NFL player with Miami Dolphins, attended Los Gatos High School
- Nick Bawden – NFL player with New York Jets, attended Los Gatos High School
- Hunter Bigge – player with Tampa Bay Rays, attended Los Gatos High School
- Rob Blake – former Los Angeles Kings player
- Jeff Blauser – former Atlanta Braves shortstop, born in Los Gatos
- Brent Burns – San Jose Sharks player, resident
- Joe Cannon – San Jose Earthquakes player
- Hal Chase – early 20th Century baseball star, born in Los Gatos
- Megan Cooke – silver medalist rower, born in Los Gatos
- Devin Cooley - Calgary Flames goaltender
- Vincent Damphousse – San Jose Sharks player, resident
- Trent Edwards – former NFL quarterback, born in Los Gatos
- Peggy Fleming – Olympic gold medalist figure skater
- Dany Heatley – former San Jose Sharks player
- Jason Hinkin – pole vaulter, 5-time All-American
- Tim Hunter – former NHL forward, assistant coach, San Jose Sharks
- Joe Kapp – NFL quarterback
- Steven Kwan - MLB player for the Cleveland Guardians
- Andy Levitre – NFL offensive lineman
- Roger Maltbie – PGA Tour golfer and TV analyst
- Patrick Marleau – San Jose Sharks player
- Steve Mariucci – NFL and NCAA coach, resident
- Ryan Nyquist – bicycle moto-cross rider
- Elliana Pogrebinsky – figure skater
- Mike Ricci – San Jose Sharks player, resident
- Jeremy Roenick – former San Jose Sharks player
- Logan Schafer – former MLB outfielder, attended Los Gatos High School
- Kyle Shanahan - NFL Head Coach
- Joe Thornton – San Jose Sharks player
- Jake Tonges - San Francisco 49ers tight end
- Christine Von Saltza, winner of three gold medals and one silver for Swimming at 1960 Summer Olympics attended Los Gatos High School
- Charlie Wedemeyer – football coach
- Doug Wilson – general manager, San Jose Sharks
- Kevin Youkilis – Major League Baseball player
- Russell Mark Tanner – Volleyball player
- John Ellis – PGA Tour Golfer and Professional Caddie

=== Business ===
- Jim Goetz – investor in WhatsApp
- Charles Walton – inventor of RFID, founder of Proximity Devices, Inc
- Steve Wozniak – Apple Computer co-founder
- Chuck Robbins – Cisco Systems CEO

=== Musicians ===
- Dredg – band formed in Los Gatos
- Casey Hensley – blues, swing, and rock and roll singer, songwriter and record producer, born in Los Gatos
- Yehudi Menuhin – violinist
- Trapt – band formed in Los Gatos
- Bassnectar – electronic music producer and DJ from Los Gatos
- Marco Pitruzzella – drummer

=== Writers and journalists ===
- Neal Cassady – author and iconic figure in Beat Movement of 1950s and 1960s
- Victor Koman – science fiction writer and publisher
- Ross Macdonald – novelist, born in Los Gatos
- Alice MacGowan - author, resident for ten years
- Rudy Rucker – author
- Josh Shipp – TV host, journalist and author
- John Steinbeck – author, resident for several years
- Charles Erskine Scott Wood – author, civil libertarian, soldier, and attorney
- Sandy Hill – author, socialite, and second American woman to complete the Seven Summits

=== Other ===
- Rollo Beck, ornithologist, was born in Los Gatos in 1870
- Mark Bingham and Todd Beamer – passengers of United Airlines Flight 93 on 9/11, believed to have stormed the cockpit after its hijacking
- Eric Drew – activist and consumer advocate
- Ronald Fagin – computer scientist known for Fagin's theorem and winner of the Gödel Prize
- Dan Jinks – American Film and Television Producer, Oscar Winner for American Beauty
- David Kinch – chef and restaurateur, owner of three Michelin star-rated Manresa in Los Gatos
- Charles A. Lockwood – World War II Commander Submarine Force Pacific Fleet
- Richard Thacker Morris – chairman of sociology department of UCLA
- Kenny Ortega – director, choreographer
- Steve Poizner – State Insurance Commissioner of California, candidate for Governor
- Blessed Miguel Pro – Mexican Jesuit priest and martyr, studied in Los Gatos after fleeing persecution in Mexico.
- Tucker Reed – Feminist author and convicted killer
