= Susan M. Gaines =

American writer

Susan Mary Gaines
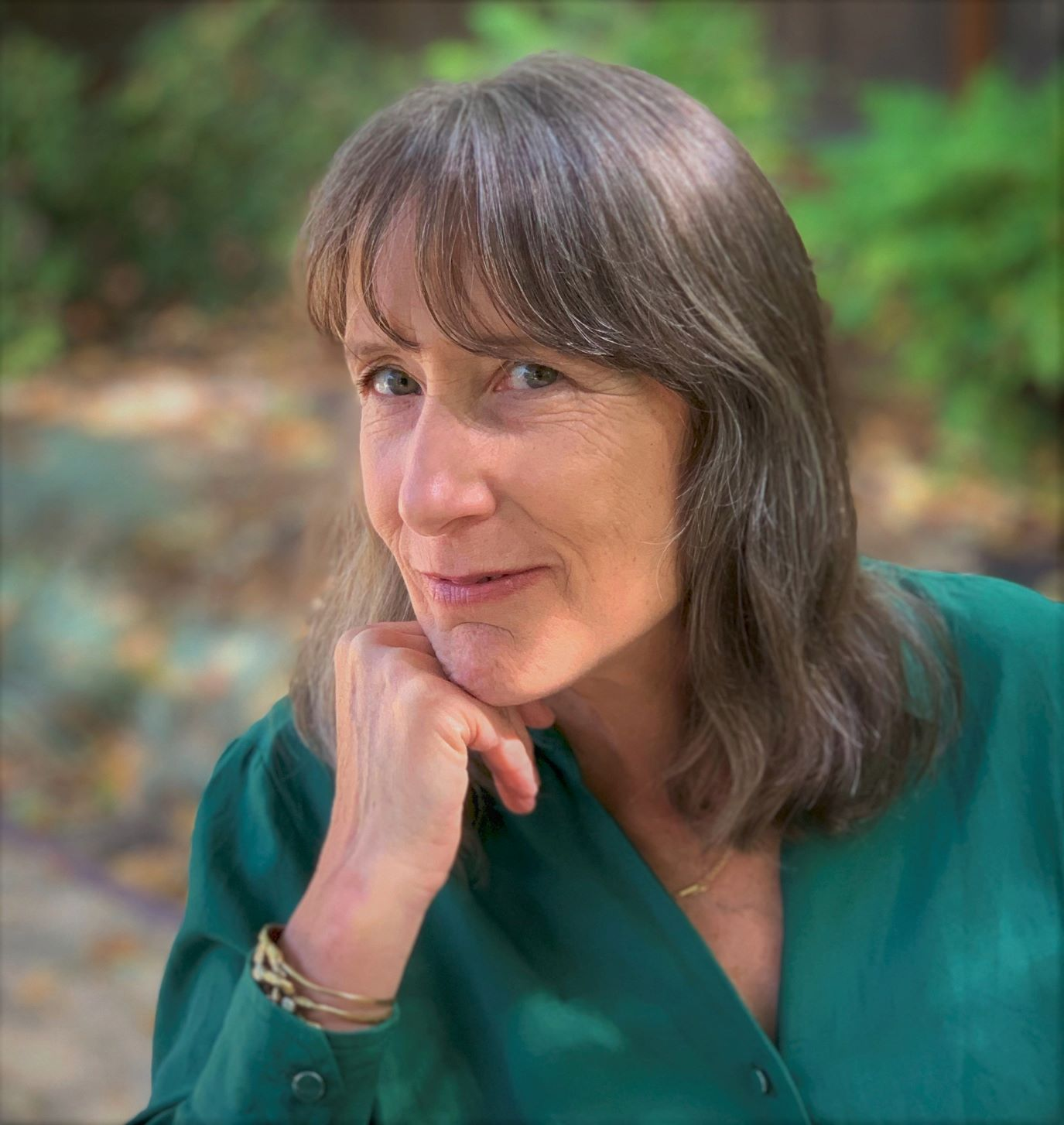
- Education: Humboldt State University (BA); University of California San Diego (MS)
- Occupation: Fiction writer
- Spouse: Stephan Leibfried
- Writing career
- Language: English
- Genre: literary fiction
- Subject: science
- Website: susanmgaines.com

Susan M Gaines is an American writer. She is the author of the novels Accidentals (2020) and Carbon Dreams (2001), and co-author with Geoffrey Eglinton and Jurgen Rullkötter of the science book Echoes of Life: What Fossil Molecules Reveal about Earth History (2009). Her short stories have been nominated twice for the Pushcart Prize. She is a former fellow of the Hanse Institute for Advanced Study in Germany. In 2018, she was awarded a Suffrage Science Award for women in science and science writers who have inspired others.

== Background ==
Gaines originally trained as a chemist and oceanographer, and received a master's degree from Scripps Institution of Oceanography in 1987. She has published peer-reviewed papers in The Journal of Organic Chemistry and the Journal of Chromatography A, as well as essays and short stories in an assortment of journals, literary magazines, and anthologies (Econ Papers, Nature, and The North American Review). She founded the "Fiction Meets Science" research and fellowship program at the University of Bremen.

== Writing career ==
Gaines began publishing short stories in the early 1990s. Her short story The Mouse was selected for The Best of the West 5, one in a series of annual anthologies of short stories, published annually from 1988 to 1992.

Her novel Carbon Dreams was published in 2001. Set in the early 1980s, it tells the story of a woman who discovers a way to study climate in the distant past that may have relevance for the climate of the future, and about the scientific, ethical and personal controversies that she inadvertently becomes embroiled in. Elizabeth Wilson, writing in Chemical and Engineering News, called it a "step forward in the evolution of science-in-fiction.... A remarkable job of conveying what it's really like to be a scientist, and to make scientific discoveries - not in the blink of an eye, as television or movies would have it, but with gradually shifting insight." It is considered an early contribution to the Lab lit genre.

Gaines's 2020 novel Accidentals is the story of an Uruguayan-American family, noted for its "melding of sensual landscapes with ruminations on political history and environmental devastation" and "critique of globalization." Like Carbon Dreams, it has been recognized as a "rare" and "well-written" example of a realist novel about science and compared to the work of Barbara Kingsolver.

A work of non-fiction Echoes of Life: What Fossil Molecules Reveal about Earth History, published in 2009, provides an up-to-date survey of the interdisciplinary field of organic geochemistry, using the history of discovery, from early experiments in the 1930s to modern areas of research, to make the material accessible to students and scientists in different fields.

== Bibliography ==
- Carbon Dreams (2001)
- Echoes of Life: What Fossil Molecules Reveal about Earth History (2009)
- Accidentals (2020)
