= American Institute of Biological Sciences =

Nonprofit scientific association

- Abbreviation: AIBS
- Formation: 1947
- Type: Nonprofit
- Purpose: Biology Biological Sciences, and many other fields in Conservation and Biomedical sciences
- Headquarters: Herndon, Virginia
- Region served: National
- Members: Organizations
- President: Charles Fenster, 2020
- Staff: 18
- Website: www.aibs.org

The American Institute of Biological Sciences (AIBS) is a nonprofit scientific public charitable organization. The organization's mission is to promote the use of science to inform decision-making and advance biology for the benefit of science and society.

== Overview ==
AIBS serves as a society of societies. It has 98 member organizations and is headquartered in Herndon, VA. Its staff work to achieve its mission by publishing the peer-reviewed journal BioScience, providing peer review and advisory support services for funding organizations, providing professional development for scientists and students, advocating for science policy and educating the public about biology. AIBS works with like-minded organizations, funding agencies, and nonprofit and for-profit entities to promote the use of science to inform decision-making.

AIBS is governed by an esteemed Board of Directors and a Council of representatives of its member organizations.

== Background and history ==
AIBS was established in 1947 as a part of the National Academy of Sciences. The overarching goal was to unify the individuals and organizations that collectively represent the biological sciences, so that the community could address matters of common concern. In the 1950s, AIBS became an independent, member-governed, nonprofit 501(c)3 public charity scientific organization. In 1962, the National Science Foundation audited the books of IABS and froze assets, eventually leading to AIBS having to pay back nearly $500,000 and institute a program of austerity. By the 1970s it appeared to have largely recovered.

== Strategic priorities ==
AIBS works toward overarching outcomes through three strategic priorities:

- Scientific Peer Advisory and Review Services for research proposals and programs sponsored by funding organizations, including the federal government, state agencies, private research foundations, other non-government organizations and educate the community about the science of peer review.
- Publications and Communications, including reliable reports, analyses, and the peer-reviewed journal BioScience, which is a forum for integrating the life sciences and educating the public about biological sciences.
- Community Programs that advance the field and profession of biology while promoting and providing leadership, with a particular emphasis on public policy and advocacy, education and professional development, as well as public awareness of science.

== Core activities ==
The American Institute of Biological Sciences promotes the use of science to inform decision-making and advances biology for the benefit of science and society through:

- Assessment. Coordinating and facilitating expert merit-based evaluation of research proposals, ongoing research programs, and completed research efforts, as well as analyzing merit-based peer-review activities sponsored by a diverse group of research-funding organizations.
- Advocacy. Advancing biology through programs, partnerships, and advocacy with a particular emphasis on public policy that benefits and promotes the interests and diversity of the life sciences community and informed decision-making.
- Training. Providing educational training programs to scientists that enhance their professional skills and opportunities, as well as improve their ability to engage and inform diverse audiences.
- Communication. Convening communities, publishing, and sharing scientific information (through a variety of channels) with the breadth of the scientific community, decision-makers, and the public.

=== Assessment ===
==== Scientific Peer Advisory and Review Services (SPARS) ====
The Scientific Peer Advisory and Review Services (SPARS) department is focused on coordinating, facilitating, and promoting independent, equitable evaluation processes to inform decision-making.

AIBS SPARS partners with a diverse group of organizations that are focused on a wide variety of research and funding efforts. AIBS SPARS facilitates review/advisory support services to ensure thorough and structured assessment processes are performed by vetted, qualified experts.

AIBS SPARS staff are experts in review processes and advisory services, which are often provided for proposed research grants and progress reports, ongoing funded research programs/portfolios, retrospective impact analyses, and for advisory boards and committees.

==== Science of Peer Review ====
The empirical basis upon which peer review rests is limited. To build up this literature base, AIBS SPARS staff perform in-house research and meta-analyses on the peer review process and share results with the scientific community through publications and presentations.

=== Advocacy ===
==== Public Policy Office ====
The Public Policy Office works to educate policymakers about the importance of investing in biology and advocates for policies that serve the needs of researchers, educators, and other biological science professionals. Issues addressed by the office include but are not limited to: funding for the biological sciences; funding for research infrastructure, including scientific collections and field stations; strengthening science education policy; investing in the scientific workforce; and promoting scientific integrity and transparency.

=== Training ===
With over 2,600 people trained, AIBS provides training programs to scientists that enhance their professional skills and opportunities, as well as improve their ability to engage and inform diverse audiences. Workshops include:

- Employment Acquisition Skills Boot Camp for Scientists: Helping scientists hone and practice the skills needed to secure employment
- Writing for Impact and Influence: Helping scientists and graduate students hone their written communication skills to increase the impact and influence of their message
- Enabling Interdisciplinary and Team Science: Providing participants with the knowledge and skills required to become productive and effective members of scientific teams
- Communication Bootcamp: Helps the science community learn how to engage and inform decision-makers and have the opportunity to become effective and engaged communicators

=== Communications ===
==== Faces of Biology Photo Contest ====
AIBS conducts a yearly photo contest that helps communicate science through imagery. Photographs entered into the contest must depict a person, such as a scientist, researcher, collections curator, technician, or student, engaging in biological research. The depicted research may occur outside, in a lab, with a natural history collection, on a computer, in a classroom, or elsewhere.

==== Publications ====
AIBS publishes BioScience, a peer-reviewed monthly journal with content written and edited for accessibility to researchers, educators, and students. The journal is heavily cited, with a 2021 Impact Factor of 11.687. AIBS also publishes BioScience Talks, a companion podcast to the journal.

BioScience includes articles about research findings and techniques, advances in biology education, professionally written feature articles about new developments in biology, discussions of professional issues, book reviews, news about AIBS, and a policy column (Washington Watch). Roundtables, forums, and viewpoint articles offer the perspectives of opinion leaders and invite further commentary.

== See also ==
- BioScience
