= Los Gatos–Saratoga Union High School District =

School district in California, U.S.

Los Gatos-Saratoga Union High School District

Address
- 17421 Farley Road West Los Gatos, California; United States

District information
- President: Katherine Tseng
- Vice-president: Misty Davies
- Superintendent: Heath Rocha
- Schools: Los Gatos High School; Saratoga High School
- NCES District ID: 0622800

Students and staff
- Students: 3,470 (2020–2021)
- Teachers: 159.9 (FTE)
- Staff: 138.19 (FTE)
- Student–teacher ratio: 21.7:1

Other information
- Website: lgsuhsd.org

The Los Gatos-Saratoga Union High School District (formerly Los Gatos-Saratoga Joint Union High School District) is a high school district in the greater San Jose, California, U.S. area. It operates two high schools, and is ranked the Best School District in California.

School name	City	Students	FTE Teachers	Student/Teacher Ratio
Los Gatos High School	Los Gatos	2166	94	22
Saratoga High School	Saratoga	1386	70	19

Note: student count based on 2020 state report. FTE & ratio based on current U.S. News & World Report profile.

The school district serves residents of the Saratoga Union School District, the Lakeside Joint School District, the Los Gatos Union School District, and the Loma Prieta Joint Union Elementary School District.

== See also ==
- Los Gatos Union School District
- Saratoga Union School District
