= Richie Grant =

Richie Grant may refer to:

- Richie Grant (soccer) (born 1970), American soccer coach and former soccer player
- Richie Grant (American football) (born 1997), American football safety

== See also ==
- Richard Grant (disambiguation)
