= Jordan Corey =

American singer (born 1990)

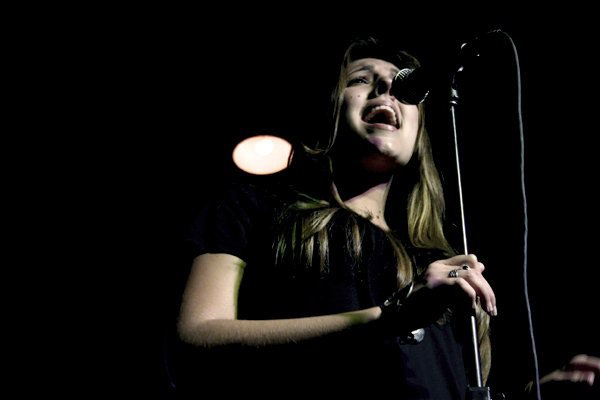

Background information
- Born: Jordan Corey; September 28, 1990 (age 36)
- Origin: San Francisco Bay Area, California
- Genres: Indie, soul, rock
- Occupations: Singer, songwriter, musician
- Instruments: Vocals, piano
- Years active: 2004–present
- Label: Independent
- Website: www.jordancorey.com

Jordan Corey (born September 28, 1990) is a California-based independent singer-songwriter.

== Early career ==
Originally from the San Francisco Bay Area, Corey attended Los Gatos High School. During this time, she formed theJOEband, a classic rock cover band that won Clear Channel's, 98.5 KFOX Last Band Standing competition in 2007, jumpstarting a career of live performances around the Bay Area.

In 2008, Corey entered University of California, Santa Barbara (UCSB), and was a member of Alpha Phi. During which time she was the lead singer of SoulMinded, a soul/reggae/funk band that performed around the Santa Barbara and Los Angeles areas. With SoulMinded, she performed at UCSB's Extravaganza 2010 – an all-day music festival for the Santa Barbara community. Corey played alongside Drake, Chromeo, and Edward Sharpe and the Magnetic Zeros.

In 2009, Corey recorded her debut EP in Los Angeles. The seven-song release featured notable producers and songwriters including The Stereotypes (Natasha Bedingfield/Mary J. Blige). The EP featured the track "Truth" and was a hit on social media.

== Currently ==
On August 25, 2015, Corey released her new album All That written and co produced by Jordan Corey.

In August 2015, the single "Focus" from the new album was released along with the official music video.

In 2014 Jordan Corey began writing and co producing her new album "All That". The new music is a fusion of soul and movement which she calls "future soul". Pulling inspiration from contemporaries like Blood Orange, Jessie Ware, and Frank Ocean, with an pop/soul twist infusing 90s R&B. Her newest project, All That, It is a reflection of life, love, and purpose.

Jordan Corey is currently featured as a New "Artist to Watch" by iHeartRadio.

In 2011, Corey began working on her next release with producer Jason Hollis and songwriter/producer Dan Dixon (Dropsonic). The resulting tracks would become her second EP, Do Me Wrong. Corey co-wrote all five of the EP's original songs—the sixth track being a reinvented version of The Rolling Stones classic, "Miss You."

Recorded in Los Angeles' Sonora Recorders, using vintage and analog gear, Corey's second release features a distinctive 1960s–1970s soul sound with an indie twist. Do Me Wrong also features saxophonist Lon Price (The Rolling Stones/Leonard Cohen) and was mixed by five-time Grammy Award winner, Matt Hyde.

Do Me Wrong was released in March 2012. The single "Tonight" from the EP hit Hot AC Radio the week of April 22, 2012.

Invigorated by the response to Do Me Wrong, Corey/Dixon/Hollis went back into the studio to work on a follow-up record. The three-song EP was initially written as part of a larger work, but after recording the tracks, Corey felt that the songs stood on their own; each a pillar in her artistic voyage.

On March 12, 2013, Corey took to the Internet asking fans to financially back her sophomore release, Trilogy. The project would be a 3-song EP accompanied by a 3-part video series that Corey would conceptualize and produce with a team of filmmakers. 30 days later, Corey independently raised over $16,000 for the projects' release and began an almost yearlong journey.

Trilogy EP was released in October 2013.

Following the EP, the accompanying 3-part video series were released:

- Part I: Final Goodbye – October 22, 2013
- Part II: Hold Me Under – November 5, 2013
- Part III: Here Right Now – November 19, 2013

== Discography ==
=== All That ===
1. "All That"
2. "Your Shore"
3. "Float"
4. "Rewind"
5. "Focus"
6. "Stoned"
7. "All That" (Live)
8. "Your Shore" (Live)
9. "Float" (Live)
10. "Rewind" (Live)
11. "Focus" (Live)
12. "Stoned" (Live)

=== Trilogy EP ===
1. "Final Goodbye"
2. "Hold Me Under"
3. "Here Right Now"

=== Do Me Wrong EP ===
1. "Take it Back"
2. "Do Me Wrong"
3. "Good Love"
4. "Heart of Stone"
5. "Miss You"
6. "Tonight"

=== Truth EP ===
1. "Lady"
2. "Remember My Name"
3. "Truth"
4. "Breaking All the Rules"
5. "Back to Life"
6. "Exit"
7. "In Love"
