= Echoes of Life =

2008 book by Susan M. Gaines

Echoes of Life : What Fossil Molecules Reveal about Earth History
- Author: Susan M. Gaines, Geoffrey Eglinton, and Jurgen Rullkotter
- Language: English
- Genre: Non-fiction
- Publisher: Oxford University Press
- Publication date: 2008
- Pages: 376
- ISBN: 978-0-19-517619-3

Echoes of Life: What Fossil Molecules Reveal about Earth History is a book by Susan M. Gaines, Geoffrey Eglinton, and Jurgen Rullkotter concerning organic chemistry and, in particular, the links between the living and the material Earth. It was published by Oxford University Press in 2008.

== Synopsis ==
Echoes of Life chronicles the history of the discipline of organic geochemistry. In early experiments, Alfred E. Treibs identified organic molecules, which he extracted from various samples, as chemically altered chlorophyll. He explained the chlorophyll as having come from plants that died millions of years ago. Since Treibs' discovery, thousands of biomarkers (a term coined 25 years after Treibs' discovery) have been identified.

Chapter one, entitled Molecular Informants: A Changing Perspective of Organic Chemistry, gives a brief overview on the history of organic chemistry and explores the possibilities inherent in the science. It also describes how the authors first became interested in the subject and the work they have done within the field.

Chapter two entitled Looking to the Rocks: Molecular Clues to the Origin of Life looks at the findings of Sir Robert Robinson and Melvin Calvin discoveries of organic compounds in petrol and the conversion of CO_{2} to organic molecules during photosynthesis. Early experiments had shown that organic compounds can form spontaneously under conditions similar to the pre-biotic era of Earth. These findings led to speculation on the possible discovery on the origins of life. The chapter ends with the authors saying as a precursor to the next chapter

If it was hard to resist the mystique and romance of three-billion-year-old rocks that might contain clues to the origin of life on Earth, it was even harder to resist a hunt for signs of life or its precursors on other planets—if only for the thrill of seeing and handling their rocks.

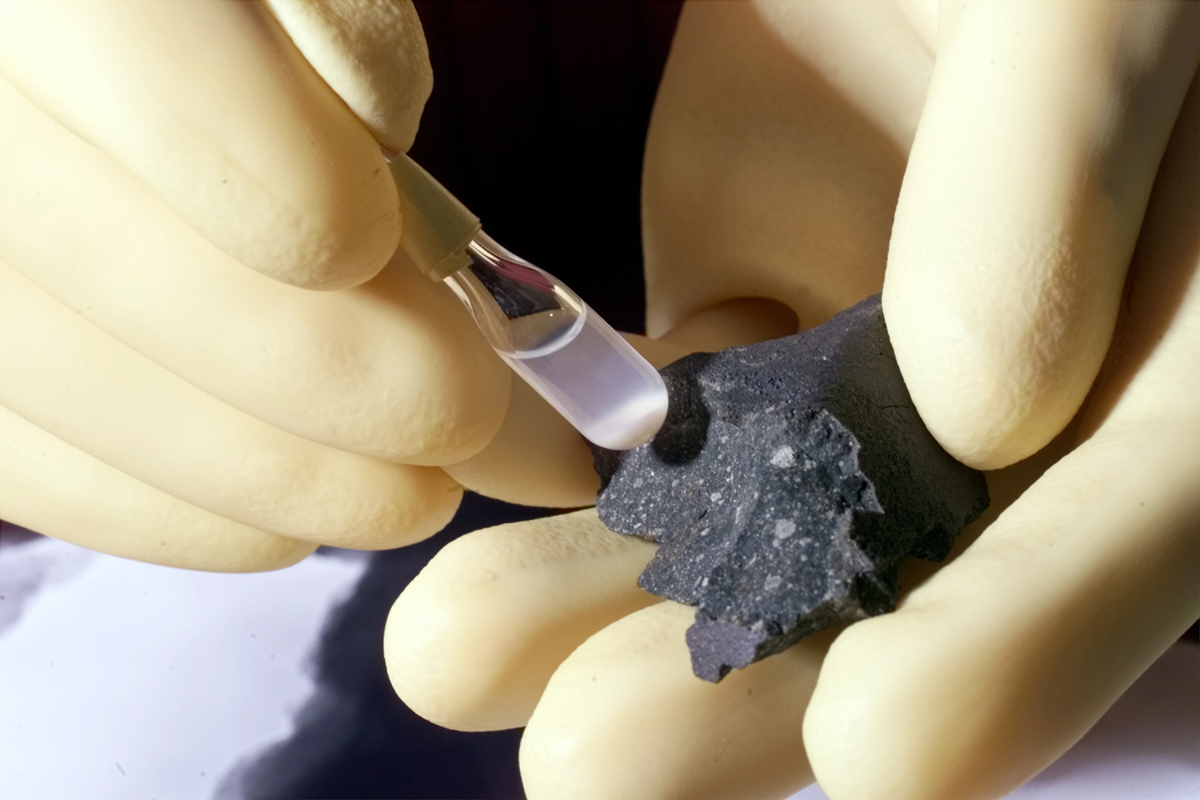
Fragment of the Murchison meteorite

Chapter three entitled From the Moon to Mars: The Search for Extraterrestrial Life. A Carbonaceous Meteorite which was found in Hungary in 1857, which was examined by Friedrich Wöhler was found to have organic compounds which he believed were Extraterrestrial in origin. The book moves on to Marcellin Berthelot who in 1864 claimed to have found "petroleum-like hydrocarbons" in a meteorite found near Orgueil. Louis Pasteur also ran experiments on this meteor and concluded it was sterile and not capable of generating life. The discovery of the Murchison meteorite also led to the finding of 70 amino acids most of which are not native to Earth's biosphere. The authors look into the work done on samples brought back from the Apollo program missions. Geoffrey Eglinton one of the authors had been given a sample and although he knew there had never been life on the Moon they had hoped to find organic compounds. None were found within those samples, which led to disappointment. These findings led the authors to speculate on the possibility of answering the question of whether there has ever been life on Mars and if future missions will bring back viable samples for testing.

== Reception ==
The book has received positive reviews in specialist scientific journals such as Astrobiology and from the Astrobiology Society of Britain.

Bill Green, writing in Chemical & Engineering News, called it "a remarkable book" and a "highly readable introduction to the field of organic geochemistry and that it also manages to capture the deep sense of curiosity and wonder associated with scientific investigation.".

In BioScience, Karen Bushaw-Newton said that "those who are looking to broaden their knowledge of the connections between chemical compounds and the diversity of life, will find Echoes of Life well worth reading."

Katherine H. Freeman writing for Science said that "the authors interweave an account of the development of biomarker research and sketches of what these fossil organic molecules tell us about the histories of Earth and life".

== See also ==
- Marcellin Berthelot
