= Jason Jurman =

American actor (1979-2014)

Jason Jurman (November 6, 1979 – October 11, 2014) was an American film, television and theater actor. He was best known for his starring role in the 2007 film Cougar Club, opposite Warren Kole, Joe Mantegna, Faye Dunaway, and Carrie Fisher. His television credits included roles in The Bedford Diaries, Blue Bloods, and Law & Order.

Jurman was born on November 6, 1979, and raised in Los Gatos, California. He graduated from Los Gatos High School in 1998. Jurman won the High School Actor of the Year Award from the American Musical Theatre of San Jose for his performance in the school's production of Fame. In 2002, Jurman received a Bachelor of Fine Arts from the Boston Conservatory, where he had studied in the theater division.

He began his professional career by performing at the San Jose Civic Light Opera and the San Jose Children's Musical Theater. His television roles included appearances in Law & Order, Arrested Development, Law & Order: Special Victims Unit, 30 Rock and Blue Bloods.

Jurman and Warren Kole co-starred in the 2007 film Cougar Club.

Jason Jurman died on October 11, 2014, at the age of 34. He was buried in Los Gatos Memorial Park.
