= Marshall Merritt =

American painter

Marshall Everett Merritt
- Pacific Green Waters
- Born: 1904
- Died: 1978 (aged 73–74)
- Known for: Painting
- Movement: Impressionism

Marshall Everett Merritt (August 1904 – July 1978) was an American artist. An impressionist painter, he specialized in seascapes, particularly oil depictions of the California coast. He also painted many landscapes, portraits and still lifes.

He was a member of the Artists' Guild of America and the Los Gatos Art Association. He served as vice president of the latter for several years during the mid to late 1950s.

For many years, Marshall Merritt maintained a studio in Willits, California. While in Willits, he would spend as much as four months each year on the Monterey Peninsula painting landscapes and seascapes. In the 1950s he moved his studio to Los Gatos, California where he lived with his third wife Caroline.

During his career he exhibited at the De Young Museum in San Francisco, the Mendocino County Fair, and various galleries on the Monterey Peninsula and in northern California. In 1955 he presented his works at a solo exhibition at the Artist's Guild of America in Carmel. His works are in private collections throughout the United States and Europe.

He was an accomplished craftsman in other media; for instance, he carved wooden frames for many of his paintings.

Marshall Merritt had two daughters, Virginia and Shirley. He died while on vacation in the north central U.S. in July 1978. He was a resident of Los Gatos, California at the time of his death.
