= Richard P. Grant =

English biologist

Richard P. Grant is a British biologist and former writer/editor of The Scientist.

== Early life and education ==
Grant's father was a non-commissioned officer in the Royal Air Force. At University of Oxford, Grant was awarded Master of Arts (Oxford, Cambridge, and Dublin) Biochemistry and a Doctor of Philosophy, then did postdoctoral research in molecular biochemistry.

== Career ==
He made DNA extraction technology for a company in Cambridge, then found a postdoctoral position at Medical Research Council (MRC) Laboratory of Molecular Biology (LMB) working six years for Murray Stewart. Grant then worked as a cell biologist for three years in Sydney, where the University asked him to write a science blog. Grant then took a job with Faculty of 1000, in the UK, rebuilding a website and writing for The Scientist, and later became a Senior Writer at a London medical education & publishing agency. Grant is deputy editor of the webzine LabLit.com and Jennifer Rohn is the editor. Grant and Rohn campaigned for Science is Vital, against cuts to the public funding of science in the United Kingdom.

== Occam's Typewriter ==
Grant hosts blogging for Jennifer Rohn, Henry Gee, Athene Donald, Nicola Spaldin, Cath Ennis, and several other writers.
