= Loma Prieta Joint Union Elementary School District =

School district in California, United States

Address
- 23800 Summit Road Santa Clara County Los Gatos, California, 95033; United States

District information
- Grades: K–8
- Superintendent: Dr. Kevin Grier
- Schools: C. T. English Middle; Loma Prieta Elementary
- Budget: $4,751,000 (2009–10)
- NCES District ID: 0622350

Students and staff
- Students: 424 (2021–2022)
- Teachers: 22.08 (FTE)
- Staff: 28.16 (FTE)
- Student–teacher ratio: 19.20:1

Other information
- Website: www.loma.k12.ca.us

Loma Prieta Joint Union Elementary School District is a public school district based in Santa Clara County, California, United States.

Residents of this school district are zoned to high schools in the Los Gatos-Saratoga Joint Union High School District.

== Schools ==
The district operates one elementary school and one middle school. The district has no operating charter schools.

Both schools were badly damaged by the Loma Prieta earthquake. They were mostly shut down for many years, but the administrative buildings were cleaned up and used for a home schooling program, Loma Prieta Independent Home Study. The site was razed and rebuilt in the late '90s and early 2000s, and both schools reopened as public schools at that time.

Both schools are located at the single campus in rural Los Gatos. Use the mapping tool at left or click on the Earth symbols below to see a map showing all seven locations.

| School name | address & coordinates | elevation & GNIS ID | students | grades | NCES School ID | notes |
|---|---|---|---|---|---|---|
| C. T. English Middle School | 23800 Summit Rd. Los Gatos, California 95033; 37.126030°N 121.944016°W | | 157 | 6–8 | 062235002672 | |
| Loma Prieta Elementary School | 23800 Summit Rd. Los Gatos, California 95033 | | 259 | K–5 | 062235002673 | |

Note: school enrollment data is for 2010–11.
