= Richard Grant (Royal Navy officer) =

British Royal Navy officer (1783-1859)

Rear-Admiral Sir Richard Grant
- Born: 1783; Kingston, Colony of Jamaica
- Died: 3 March 1859 (aged 75–76); Shawefield, Havant, Hampshire, England
- Spouse: Lydia Grant (1846)
- Military career
- Allegiance: Kingdom of Great Britain
- Branch: Royal Navy
- Rank: Rear-Admiral

Sir Richard Grant (1783 – 3 March 1859) was a British Royal Navy officer who was knighted in 1820.

== Early life ==
Sir Richard Grant was born in 1783 in Kingston, Colony of Jamaica. His father, Richard Grant, Esq., held the office of King's Proctor under King George III in Jamaica. He was a relative of British inventor Sir Thomas Tassell Grant.

== Career ==
Richard Grant joined the Royal Navy in July 1798 as a first-class volunteer on board HMS Royal Sovereign with Captain William Bedford. His naval career started under Admiral Alan Gardner, 1st Baron Gardner. Appointed midshipman of HMS Révolutionnaire in July 1801, he remained aboard the vessel until September 1804. After returning from a voyage to Jamaica, he rejoined Lord Gardner aboard HMS Trent, stationed off the Cove of Cork. In early 1805, he was posted to the British West Indies as acting lieutenant on HMS Elk under Captain R. M'Donnell and alongside James Richard Dacres. Following his promotion on 5 October 1805, he joined HMS Penguin under Captain Henry Gage Morris. Later, he served aboard HMS Wolfe and HMS Veteran, Vice Admiral James Richard Dacres' flagship, among other vessels. He reached the rank of commander on 7 November 1818.

Grant was knighted in 1820 by Charles Chetwynd-Talbot, 2nd Earl Talbot, who served as the Lord Lieutenant of Ireland.

He was appointed second captain of HMS Hussar on 17 May 1827, serving under Admiral Sir Charles Ogle at Halifax, Nova Scotia. In the following year, he was transferred to HMS Tyne. Upon his transfer, the naval officer was appointed captain of the Tyne on 17 May 1828. He became part of HMS Castor's crew stationed at Chatham in 1832. By 1837, he was appointed flag captain on HMS Cornwallis, serving with Hon. Sir Charles Paget on the North America and West Indies Station. He was later stationed aboard HMS St Vincent, the flagship of Sir Charles Ogle, at Portsmouth in 1845. In 1849, he was noted in A Naval Biographical Dictionary by Irish biographer William Richard O'Byrne. Promoted to rear admiral on the reserved list in 1855, his service record included deployments to the East and West Indies, the Mediterranean, Baltic, and North America.

== Personal life ==
His spouse was Lady Lydia Grant of Hawkhurst, a widow of James Lambert. He married her on 29 July 1846. At this time, the pair continued to live at Fowlers Park House in Hawkhurst until 1853. He also resided at 3 Connaught Place, Hyde Park, London.

== Death ==
Sir Richard Grant died in Shawefield, Havant, Hampshire, England on 3 March 1859.
