= Russell Mark Tanner =

American volleyball player

Russell Mark Tanner (born November 13, 1977) is an American volleyball player. Tanner grew up playing beach volleyball in Northern California with his father, Mark Tanner. Tanner's uncle, Troy Tanner, is an Olympic gold medalist. Tanner was a Junior Olympic All-American, high school and league MVP, and an all-state selection out of high school. Tanner played Division I (NCAA) volleyball at Brigham Young University in Provo, Utah.

== Beach Volleyball Record ==
In 1994, Tanner became the youngest player in beach volleyball history to earn a AAA rating, surpassing the long-standing record previously held by beach volleyball player Mike Dodd. The record stood for 12 years until it was eclipsed by Hawk Hatcher in 2007.
