= Jennifer Rohn =

American biologist and writer

Jenny Rohn
- Jennifer Rohn in 2011
- Born: Jennifer Leigh Rohn; 1967 (age 58–59); Stow, Ohio, U.S.
- Citizenship: British, American
- Education: Oberlin College (BA); University of Washington (PhD)
- Known for: Lab lit Science is Vital campaign
- Awards: Suffrage Science award (2014)
- Scientific career
- Fields: Cell biology
- Workplaces: London Research Institute; University College London; University of Washington
- Thesis: The evolution of feline leukemia virus in vivo: A model of understanding viral genetic determinants of pathogenicity (1996)
- Doctoral advisor: Julie M. Overbaugh
- Website: jennyrohn.com

Jennifer Leigh Rohn (born 1967 in Stow, Ohio) is a British-American scientist and novelist. She is a cell biologist at University College London, editor of the webzine LabLit.com and founder of the Science is Vital organization that campaigns against cuts to the public funding of science in the United Kingdom.

== Education ==
Rohn graduated from Oberlin College with a Bachelor of Arts degree in Biology in 1990. Following this Rohn was awarded a Doctor of Philosophy degree in 1996 from the University of Washington for work on Feline leukemia virus (FeLV).

== Career and research ==
After postdoctoral research at the Cancer Research UK London Research Institute (now incorporated into the Francis Crick Institute) studying apoptosis and cancer with Gerard Evan, Rohn moved to the Netherlands to lead a research group at the biotech start-up company, Leadd BV. After moving into scientific publishing for a few years, Rohn joined University College London in 2007, setting up her own group in the Centre for Nephrology at University College London in 2015.

Rohn's initial research interest was in virology. Over the following 15 years Rohn studied apoptosis and the shape of cells. Rohn's current research interests include study of urinary tract infections. Rohn works with engineers to put antibiotics within core-shell capsules to treat persistent urinary tract infections. Rohn grows bladder epithelia in culture to test new treatments for urinary tract infections.

=== Publications ===
Rohn's first novel, Experimental Heart, was published by Cold Spring Harbor Laboratory Press (CSHLP) in 2008. This is written in the lab lit genre, which she is well known for championing, and represents a departure for CSHLP, which had previously only published scientific non-fiction. Her second novel, The Honest Look, was also published by CSHLP in November 2010. Her third novel, Cat Zero, was published by Bitingduck Press in June 2018. Rohn has also had short fiction, news and opinion published in Nature and The Guardian

=== Awards and honours ===
In 2011, Rohn won the inaugural Research Fortnight "Achiever of the Year" award, and received the Society for Experimental Biology's President's Medal in the Education and Public Affairs Section. She won the Suffrage Science award in 2013.
