= Cougar Club =

2007 film directed by Christopher Duddy

- DVD cover
- Directed by: Christopher Duddy
- Screenplay by: Cris Mancuso
- Story by: Christopher Duddy; Glenn W. Garland; Cris Mancuso
- Produced by: Christopher Duddy; Glenn W. Garland
- Starring: Jason Jurman; Warren Kole; Joe Mantegna; Izabella Scorupco; Faye Dunaway; Carrie Fisher; Mo Collins; Kaley Cuoco; Chyna; Loretta Devine; Jon Polito; Carolyn Hennesy; Norm Crosby
- Cinematography: Dennis J. Laine
- Edited by: Sam Seig
- Music by: Steve Porcaro
- Distributed by: Vivendi Entertainment
- Release date: May 19, 2007
- Running time: 93 minutes
- Country: United States
- Language: English

Cougar Club is a 2007 American comedy film directed by Christopher Duddy. The film details the attempts of two college graduates, Marshall Hogan III and Spence Holmes, to find direction in life. While working as interns for abusive divorce lawyers, they come up with a plan to make money from the passion that is Hogan's pride and Spence's secret desire: having sex with cougars. Some of the "cougars" are played by actresses such as Faye Dunaway and Carrie Fisher.

== Plot ==
Having no family, Marshall Hogan III (Warren Kole) has been granted residency in the house of his best friend Spence Holmes (Jason Jurman). But Hogan has a sexual habit that makes Spence's dad and girlfriend (Kaley Cuoco) fear that Spence could adopt it, too. It is an attraction to older—if not just plain old—women.

In college, Hogan makes out with his much older professor (Carrie Fisher) just before the graduation ceremony. In a private celebration, he dances intimately with the much older wife of the party's host, Edith (Faye Dunaway). The host is a lawyer whom Spence's father asked for a favor in hiring Spence for residency. Hogan and the host's wife disappear, but when the front wall of the treehouse Spence built as a child breaks down, everybody sees her mounting him. Losing his chance of residency, Spence's father has to ask for a favor from the worst possible candidate — the most evil divorce lawyer in town, Mr. Stack (Joe Mantegna).

Nevertheless, Spence coaxes his father to get the same job for Hogan. Thus the two best friends begin to work together. Alas, the divorce lawyers know they need their recommendation in order to be accepted into law school. Therefore, they abuse them in every way possible, from physical chores (like cutting one of the lawyers' overly dirty toenails) to doing risky and illegal PI work.

Between cleaning bathrooms and walking in on Hogan having Doggie Style sex with the office's older secretary (Loretta Devine) in the closet, Spence feels his life is not going well. One errand has Spence and Hogan delivering divorce papers to Mr. Stack's wife. Other middle-aged women are also in her house listening to a sex seminar. Hogan is approached by the woman he had sex with in the treehouse, who asks him if he and Spence had any friends who could provide pleasure for her and the other middle-aged wives and divorcées. It gives him an idea for an alternative source of livelihood. That is, forming "Cougar Club" - a place for young men to meet older women. Expensive membership fees would provide access to parties and other social gatherings.

Their first client is a pre-Bar examination law graduate in their office, who up until now only has had sex by masturbating and performing sex acts on a filing cabinet. He gains revenge on his hated boss when the guys set him up with the boss' wife, a lusty and busty Amazon, Teddy Archibald (Chyna). Meanwhile, Spence has sex with Mr. Stacks' now ex-wife in his childhood bed and Hogan, unenthusiastically and a little traumatically because she is too young for his liking, has sex with one of the other Law firm Partner's wife. Living at home, Spence's parents—accompanied by Mr. Stack—return by surprise from a vacation. Spence manages to hide the sexually engaged guests. Only the wife he has slept with, Danielle (Izabella Scorupco) is caught by Spence's girlfriend and spotted by her lawyer ex-husband, Mr. Stack.

Said husband finds papers Spence left in the office about Cougar Club. He realizes they slept with the lawyers' wives. He tips the police and a detective infiltrates the next party. When Spence and Hogan ask him for membership fees, he arrests them for pandering. The lawyer then casually walks by and fires them.

Spence returns to his girlfriend. She begins planning a wedding for them. Hogan, who crashes in with his former college professor, eventually approaches Spence with an idea—luring the vengeful lawyers to bomb his car and get arrested for terrorist acts. After the plan is carried out with success, Spence confesses to his girlfriend that he does not really love her, that he never even asked her to marry him, and once again becomes best friends with Hogan.

At their trial, Spence and Hogan use the questionable yet free services of their friend who has now passed the bar exam. The judge (Carolyn Hennesy) asks to see them in her chambers. With their lawyer momentarily outside, Hogan contends to running a legit dating service as a true cougar fan. She considers acquitting them if Spence proves he feels like Hogan. Wearing revealing clothes under her robe, she kisses Spence. He goes along with it and they make out right on her desk.

Spence invites the lawyer's wife to a new party. She never shows up, but he is still thrilled when a new cougar—the judge—arrives to celebrate with him. With no recommendation letter, Spence and Hogan expand the business via a statewide bus tour with club members and cougars alike.

== Cast ==
- Jason Jurman as Spence Holmes
- Warren Kole as Marshall Hogan III
- Joe Mantegna as Mr. Stack
- Kaley Cuoco as Amanda
- Izabella Scorupco as Daniella Paige Stack
- Chyna as Teddy Archibald
- Jon Polito as Mr. Archibald
- Loretta Devine as Dolly
- Jeremy Rowley as Karl
- Scott Michael Campbell as Mr. Conrad
- Mo Collins as Cindy Conrad
- Molly Cheek as Mrs. Holmes
- Robin Thomas as Mr. Holmes
- Carrie Fisher as Gladys Goodbey
- Carolyn Hennesy as Judge Margaret Emerson
- Faye Dunaway as Edith Birnbaum
- Joely Fisher as Lullu
- Norm Crosby as Stan Birnbaum
- Nicole Rayburn as Casey Dixon
- Joe Bucaro III as BMW car owner
