= BioScience =

Peer-reviewed scientific journal

- Discipline: Biology
- Language: English
- Edited by: Charles Fenster

Publication details
- History: 1964–present
- Publisher: Oxford University Press on behalf of the American Institute of Biological Sciences
- Frequency: Monthly
- Impact factor: 8.589 (2020)

Standard abbreviations
- ISO 4: BioScience

Indexing
- CODEN: BISNAS
- ISSN: 0006-3568 (print); 1525-3244 (web)
- LCCN: 82643645
- OCLC no.: 610211421

Links
- Journal homepage; Online access; Online archive; Online archive of the AIBS Bulletin

BioScience is a monthly peer-reviewed scientific journal that is published by Oxford University Press on behalf of the American Institute of Biological Sciences. It was established in 1964 and was preceded by the AIBS Bulletin (1951–1963).

The journal publishes literature reviews of current research in biology, as well as essays and discussion sections on education, public policy, history of biology, and theoretical issues.

== Abstracting and indexing ==
The journal is abstracted and indexed in MEDLINE/PubMed (1973–1979), the Science Citation Index, Current Contents/Agriculture, Biology & Environmental Sciences, The Zoological Record, and BIOSIS Previews. According to the Journal Citation Reports, the journal has a 2020 impact factor of 8.589.
