= Lab lit =

Realistic fiction about scientists

Lab lit (also "lablit") is a loosely defined genre of fiction, distinct from science fiction, that centers on realistic portrayals of scientists and science as a profession.

== Definition ==
Unlike science fiction, lab lit is generally set in some semblance of the real world, rather than a speculative or future one, and it deals with established scientific knowledge or plausible hypotheses. In other words, lab lit novels are mainstream or literary stories about the practice of science as a profession. They may or may not center exclusively on the science or the workplaces of scientists, but all tend to feature scientists as central characters. According to an article in the New York Times,

"Lab lit is not science fiction, and in my opinion it’s not historical fiction about actual scientists (though some fictionalized biographies do appear on the list). Instead, in the Web site’s words, it “depicts realistic scientists as central characters and portrays fairly realistic scientific practice or concepts, typically taking place in a realistic — as opposed to speculative or future — world.'"

Prominent examples of lab lit include Flight Behavior by Barbara Kingsolver, Intuition by Allegra Goodman, Mendel's Dwarf by Simon Mawer, Real Life by Brandon Taylor, and Richard Powers' The Echo Maker and Generosity. Novels set in the past featuring fictionalized explorations of real-life scientists can also be considered lab lit; examples include Kepler by John Banville, The Signature of All Things by Elizabeth Gilbert, Remarkable Creatures by Tracy Chevelier and Enigma by Robert Harris.

== History and origins ==
Works of fiction that incorporate real science into, but are not considered science fiction have also been referred to as "science in fiction." Mary Shelley's Frankenstein his often cited as an early precursor of this genre., but realistic portrayals of science in fiction were relatively rare throughout most of the twentieth century. However, a notable example from the 1950s is Isaac Asimov's A Whiff of Death, as well as examples from the beginning of the current upsurge include Cantor's Dilemma by Carl Djerassi.

The term "lab lit" was coined by Jennifer Rohn in an essay in 2005, along with the launch of the Lablit website. The term began to appear in the cultural pages of science magazines during the first decade of the 21st century and has been championed by such scientist novelists such as Carl Djerassi, Ann Lingard and Jennifer Rohn. An upturn in the publication of lab-lit novels occurred in the 1990s, with five to ten new titles appearing annually in the early 2000s. The reasons for this increase are unclear, but may include factors such as an increased interest in and familiarity with science on the part of the general public, publishers, and established authors.

== See also ==
- C. P. Snow
- Hard science fiction
- Mundane science fiction
- Climate fiction
- Solar
