= Grant (given name) =

Grant is an English given name derived from the French grand meaning 'tall' or 'large'. It was originally a nickname given to those with remarkable size.

== Notable people with the given name "Grant" include ==
=== A ===
- Grant Achatz (born 1974), American restaurateur
- Grant Achilles (born 1986), American baseball coach
- Grant Adam (born 1991), Scottish footballer
- Grant Adamson, Australian rugby league footballer
- Grant Adcox (1950–1989), American race car driver
- Grant Albrecht (born 1981), Canadian luger
- Grant D. Aldonas, American attorney
- Grant Aleksander (born 1960), American actor
- Grant Allen (1848–1899), Canadian writer
- Grant Allen (cyclist) (born 1980), Australian Paralympic cyclist
- Grant Allford (born 1950), Australian rules footballer
- Grant Anderson (disambiguation), multiple people
- Grant Atkins (born 1982), Australian rugby league referee

=== B ===
- Grant Baker (born 1973), South African surfer
- Grant Balfour (born 1977), Australian baseball player
- Grant Barlow (born 1980), Australian footballer
- Grant Barrett (born 1970), American lexicographer
- Grant Bartholomaeus (born 1968), Australian rules footballer
- Grant Basey (born 1988), English-Welsh footballer
- Grant Batty (1951–2026), New Zealand rugby union footballer
- Grant Baze (1943–2009), American bridge player
- Grant Bell, Australian rugby league football coach
- Grant Besse (born 1994), American ice hockey player
- Grant Billmeier (born 1984), American basketball player
- Grant Birchall (born 1988), Australian rules footballer
- Grant Blackwood (born 1964), American writer
- Grant Blair (born 1964), Canadian ice hockey player
- Grant Bluett, Australian orienteer
- Grant Bond (born 1974), American comic book artist
- Grant Bovey (born 1961), British businessman
- Grant Bowler (born 1968), New Zealand-Australian actor
- Grant Bowler (baseball) (1907–1968), American baseball player
- Grant Boxall (born 1976), Australian Paralympic rugby footballer
- Grant Boyce (born 1956), Australian field hockey player
- Grant Bradburn (born 1966), New Zealand cricketer
- Grant Bramwell (born 1961), New Zealand canoeist
- Grant Brebner (born 1977), Scottish-Australian footballer
- Grant Brisbee (born 1977), American writer
- Grant Bristow (born 1958), Canadian intelligence officer
- Grant Brits (born 1987), South African-Australian swimmer
- Grant Brown (born 1969), English footballer
- Grant Buchanan, New Zealand Paralympic athlete
- Grant Buist (born 1973), New Zealand cartoonist
- Grant Burgess (born 1960), English lawn bowler
- Grant Burgoyne (born 1953), American politician

=== C ===
- Grant Calcaterra (born 1998), American football player
- Grant Campbell (disambiguation), multiple people
- Grant Carpenter (1865–1936), American attorney
- Grant Carter (born 1970), American football player
- Grant Cashmore (born 1968), New Zealand equestrian
- Grant Catalino, American lacrosse player
- Grant Celliers (born 1978), South African cricketer
- Grant Chalmers (born 1969), English footballer
- Grant Chapman (born 1949), Australian politician
- Grant Clarke (1891–1931), American songwriter
- Grant Clitsome (born 1985), Canadian ice hockey player
- Grant Cogswell (born 1967), American screenwriter
- Grant Collins, Australian drummer
- Grant Conard (1867–1919), American politician
- Grant Connell (born 1965), Canadian tennis player
- Grant Connors (born 1973), Canadian weightlifter
- Grant Cooper (1903–1990), American attorney
- Grant Cornwell, American academic administrator
- Grant Crabtree (1913–2008), Canadian cinematographer
- Grant Crack (born 1963), Canadian politician
- Grant Cramer (born 1961), American actor
- Grant Cremer (born 1978), Australian runner

=== D ===
- Grant Dalton (born 1957), New Zealand sailor
- Grant Davies (born 1963), Australian canoeist
- Grant Davies (footballer) (born 1959), English footballer
- Grant Dawson (born 1994), American mixed martial artist
- Grant Dayton (born 1987), American baseball player
- Grant Deachman (1913–1983), Canadian politician
- Grant Decker (1814–1890), American politician
- Grant Delpit (born 1998), American football player
- Grant Denyer (born 1977), Australian television presenter
- Grant DePorter (born 1964), American restaurateur
- Grant Desme (born 1986), American baseball player
- Grant Devine (born 1944), Canadian politician
- Grant Dexter (1896–1961), Canadian journalist
- Grant Dezura (born 1973), Canadian curler
- Grant Dibden (born 1961), Australian bishop
- Grant Dibert, American football player
- Grant Dodwell (born 1952), Australian actor
- Grant Donaldson (born 1976), New Zealand cricketer
- Grant Doorey (born 1968), Australian rugby league footballer
- Grant Dorrington (born 1948), Australian rules footballer
- Grant Doyle (disambiguation), multiple people
- Grant Drumheller, American painter
- Grant DuBose (born 2001), American football player
- Grant Dugmore (born 1967), South African cricketer
- Grant Dunlap (1923–2014), American baseball and basketball player
- Grant Duwe, American criminologist

=== E ===
- Grant Easterbrook, American entrepreneur
- Grant Edmeades (born 1992), South African cricketer
- Grant Edwards, Australian weightlifter
- Grant Elliott (born 1979), New Zealand cricketer
- Grant Ellis (born 1993), American television personality
- Grant Enfinger (born 1985), American stock car racing driver
- Grant Erickson (born 1947), Canadian ice hockey player
- Grant Esau (born 1998), South African cricketer
- Grant Esterhuizen (born 1976), South African rugby union footballer
- Grant Evans (disambiguation), multiple people

=== F ===
- Grant Farred, South African professor
- Grant Faulkner, American writer
- Grant Featherston (1922–1995), Australian furniture designer
- Grant Fellows (1865–1929), American jurist
- Grant Fisher (born 1997), Canadian-American runner
- Grant U. Fisher (1865–1931), American politician
- Grant Fitzpatrick (born 1976), Australian Paralympic swimmer
- Grant Fitzpatrick (musician), Australian musician
- Grant Flower (born 1970), Zimbabwean cricketer
- Grant Forrest (born 1993), Scottish golfer
- Grant Forster (born 1961), English cricketer
- Grant Foster (born 1945), Australian composer
- Grant Fowler (born 1957), Australian rules footballer
- Grant Fox (born 1962), New Zealand rugby union footballer
- Grant Frame (born 1950), Canadian-American professor
- Grant Freckelton, American visual effects artist
- Grant Fuhr (born 1962), Canadian ice hockey player
- Grant Furlong (1886–1973), American physician and politician

=== G ===
- Grant O. Gale (1903–1998), American professor
- Grant Garvey (born 1996), Australian rugby league footballer
- Grant Gee (born 1964), British filmmaker
- Grant Geissman (born 1953), American guitarist
- Grant George, American voice actor
- Grant Gershon (born 1960), American conductor
- Grant Gibbs (born 1964), American soccer player
- Grant Gibbs (basketball) (born 1989), American basketball coach
- Grant Gibson (born 1948), New Zealand cricketer
- Grant Gilchrist (born 1990), Scottish rugby union footballer
- Grant Gillespie (disambiguation), multiple people
- Grant Gillis (1901–1981), American baseball player
- Grant Gillon, New Zealand politician
- Grant Gilmore (1910–1982), American law professor
- Grant Ginder (born 1983), American author
- Grant Goegan (born 1955), Italian ice hockey player
- Grant Golden (disambiguation), multiple people
- Grant Golding (born 1981), Canadian gymnast
- Grant Goldman (1950–2020), Australian television presenter
- Grant Goldschmidt (born 1983), South African volleyball player
- Grant Gondrezick (1963–2021), American basketball player
- Grant Goodeve (born 1952), American actor
- Grant Gordon (1900–1954), Canadian ice hockey player
- Grant Gordy, American guitarist
- Grant Gore (born 1991), English rugby league footballer
- Grant Gregory (born 1986), American football player
- Grant Green (disambiguation), multiple people
- Grant Greenham (1954–2018), Australian archer
- Grant Guilford, New Zealand-American academic
- Grant Gunnell (born 1999), American football player
- Grant Gustin (born 1990), American actor
- Grant Guthrie (born 1948), American football player

=== H ===
- Grant Hackett (born 1980), Australian swimmer
- Grant Hadwin (1949–1997), Canadian forest engineer
- Grant J. Hagiya (born 1952), American bishop
- Grant Haley (footballer), English footballer
- Grant Haley (American football), American football player
- Grant Hall (born 1991), English footballer
- Grant E. Hamilton (1862–1926), American political cartoonist
- Grant Hammond (1944–2019), New Zealand jurist
- Grant Hampton (born 2003), American soccer player
- Grant Hanley (born 1991), Scottish footballer
- Grant Hansen, Australian politician
- Grant Hansen (rugby union), New Zealand rugby union coach
- Grant Harrold (born 1978), British etiquette expert
- Grant Hart (1961–2017), American musician
- Grant Harvey (born 1984), American actor
- Grant Haskin (born 1968), South African politician
- Grant Hattingh (born 1990), South African rugby union footballer
- Grant Hauschild, American politician
- Grant Heard (born 1978), American football coach
- Grant Hearn, British businessman and public servant
- Grant Heckenlively (1916–1985), American football player
- Grant Hedger, Australian rugby league footballer
- Grant Hedrick (born 1991), American football player
- Grant Heffernan, Canadian ice hockey player
- Grant Henry (born 1956), American businessman
- Grant Hermanns (born 1998), American football player
- Grant Hermanus (born 1995), South African rugby union footballer
- Grant Heslov (born 1963), American actor
- Grant Hildebrand (born 1934), American architect
- Grant Hill (disambiguation), multiple people
- Grant Hillary (born 1969), South African rower
- Grant Hochstein (born 1990), American figure skater
- Grant Hodges, American politician
- Grant Hodgins (born 1955), Canadian politician
- Grant Hodnett (born 1982), South African-English cricketer
- Grant Holloway (born 1997), American hurdler
- Grant Holman (born 2000), American baseball player
- Grant Holmes (born 1996), American baseball player
- Grant Holt (born 1981), English footballer
- Grant Horscroft (born 1961), English footballer
- Grant Horsfield, South African entrepreneur
- Grant Horton (born 2001), English footballer
- Grant Howell (born 1984), South African cricketer
- Grant Hunter (born 1967), Canadian politician
- Grant Huscroft, Canadian jurist
- Grant Hutchison (born 1984), Scottish drummer
- Grant Hutton (born 1995), American ice hockey player

=== I ===
- Grant Imahara (1970–2020), American engineer and television personality
- Grant Irons (born 1979), American football player
- Grant Irvine (born 1991), Australian swimmer
- Grant Izzard (born 1970), Australian rugby league footballer

=== J ===
- Grant Jackson (disambiguation), multiple people
- Grant James (rower) (born 1987), American rower
- Grant C. Jaquith, American judge
- Grant Jeffrey (1948–2012), Canadian preacher
- Grant Jennings (born 1965), American ice hockey player
- Grant Jerrett (born 1993), American basketball player
- Grant Johannesen (1921–2005), American pianist
- Grant Johnson (disambiguation), multiple people
- Grant Jones (1938–2021), American landscape architect
- Grant Jones (rugby league) (born 1958), Australian rugby league footballer
- Grant Jordan (born 1965), Australian cricketer

=== K ===
- Grant Kekana (born 1992), South African footballer
- Grant Kemp (born 1988), South African-Hong Kong rugby union footballer
- Grant Kenny (born 1963), Australian canoeist
- Grant Kereama (born 1967), New Zealand radio host
- Grant Kerr (born 1985), Scottish footballer
- Grant King, Australian engineer
- Grant Kirkhope (born 1962), British composer
- Grant Kitchings (1938–2005), American singer
- Grant Koontz (born 1994), American cyclist
- Grant Knox (born 1960), Scottish lawn bowler
- Grant Kraemer (born 1996), American football player
- Grant Krieger, Canadian activist

=== L ===
- Grant Lambert (born 1977), Australian cricketer
- Grant Langley, American attorney
- Grant Langston (disambiguation), multiple people
- Grant Larson (1933–2020), American politician
- Grant Lauchlan, Scottish journalist
- Grant Lavigne (born 1999), American baseball player
- Grant Lawrence (born 1971), Canadian broadcaster
- Grant Lawrie (born 1958), Australian rules footballer
- Grant Leadbitter (born 1986), English footballer
- Grant Ledyard (born 1961), Canadian ice hockey player
- Grant Leep, American basketball coach
- Grant Leitch (born 1972), South African footballer
- Grant LeMarquand (born 1955), Canadian bishop
- Grant Leonard (born 1980), American basketball coach
- Grant Leury (born 1967), Australian canoeist
- Grant Lewi (1902–1951), American astrologer
- Grant Lewis (born 1985), American ice hockey player
- Grant Liddle (1921–1989), American endocrinologist
- Grant Lightbown, New Zealand footballer
- Grant Lillard (born 1995), American soccer player
- Grant Lindsay (born 1979), Australian cricketer
- Grant Lingard (1961–1995), New Zealand artist
- Grant Llewellyn (born 1960), Welsh conductor
- Grant Logan (born 1980), Scottish lawn bowler
- Grant Long (born 1966), American basketball player
- Grant Long (cricketer) (born 1961), South African cricketer
- Grant Loretz, New Zealand sailor
- Grant Lyons (born 1941), American writer

=== M ===
- Grant Macaskill, Scottish scholar
- Grant MacEwan (1902–2000), Canadian farmer and professor
- Grant Main (born 1960), Canadian rower
- Grant Major (born 1955), New Zealand art director
- Grant Manzoney (born 1969), Australian Paralympic badminton player
- Grant Margeman (born 1998), South African footballer
- Grant Marsh (1834–1916), American riverboat captain
- Grant Marshall (born 1973), Canadian ice hockey player
- Grant Martin (born 1962), Canadian ice hockey player
- Grant Martin (cricketer) (born 1999), South African cricketer
- Grant Mason (born 1983), American football player
- Grant Mattos (born 1981), American football player
- Grant McAuley (born 1949), New Zealand rower
- Grant McBride (1949–2018), Australian politician
- Grant McCann (born 1980), Northern Irish football manager
- Grant McCasland (born 1976), American basketball coach
- Grant McConachie (1909–1965), Canadian pilot
- Grant McCracken (born 1951), Canadian anthropologist
- Grant McCune (1943–2010), American special effects designer
- Grant McDonald (disambiguation), multiple people
- Grant McDougall (1910–1958), American athlete
- Grant McEachran (1894–1966), English footballer
- Grant McKee (born 1940), Canadian football player
- Grant McKelvey (born 1968), Scottish rugby union manager
- Grant McKenzie (born 1961), New Zealand cricketer
- Grant McLaren (born 1948), Canadian runner
- Grant McLean (1921–2002), Canadian film director
- Grant McLennan (1958–2006), Australian singer-songwriter
- Grant McLeod (born 1959), New Zealand field hockey player
- Grant McMartin (born 1970), Scottish footballer
- Grant McPhee, Scottish film director
- Grant McPherson (born 1964/1965), Scottish curler
- Grant Michaels (1947–2009), American writer
- Grant Miehm, Canadian illustrator
- Grant Millington (born 1986), Australian rugby league footballer
- Grant Mitchell (disambiguation), multiple people
- Grant Mitton (disambiguation), multiple people
- Grant Mizens (born 1977), Australian wheelchair basketball player
- Grant Mokoena (born 1987), South African cricketer
- Grant Morgan (disambiguation), multiple people
- Grant Morrison (born 1960), Scottish comic book writer
- Grant Morrow (born 1970), Scottish footballer
- Grant Morton (1857–1920), American skydiver
- Grant Mossop (1948–2005), Canadian geologist
- Grant E. Mouser Jr. (1895–1943), American politician
- Grant Mudford (born 1944), Australian photographer
- Grant R. Mulder, American general
- Grant Muller (born 1970), South African golfer
- Grant Mulvey (born 1956), Canadian ice hockey player
- Grant Munro (disambiguation), multiple people
- Grant Murray (born 1975), Scottish footballer
- Grant Musgrove (born 1968), Australian politician

=== N ===
- Grant Napear (born 1959), American sportscaster
- Grant Neary, American baseball coach
- Grant Needham (born 1970), Canadian soccer player
- Grant Nel (born 1988), Australian diver
- Grant Nelson (disambiguation), multiple people
- Grant Newsome (born 1997), American football coach
- Grant Nicholas (born 1967), Welsh musician
- Grant Nicholson (born 1994), English entrepreneur
- Grant Nisbett (born 1950), New Zealand broadcaster
- Grant Noel (born 1980), American football player
- Grant Notley (1939–1984), Canadian politician

=== O ===
- Grant Odishaw (born 1964), Canadian curler
- Grant Olney (born 1983), American singer-songwriter
- Grant Oppy (born 1950), Australian rules footballer
- Grant Orchard, British animator
- Grant O'Riley (born 1960), Australian rules footballer
- Grant R. Osborne (1942–2018), American theologian
- Grant Martin Overton (1887–1930), American writer

=== P ===
- Grant Page (1939–2024), Australian stuntman
- Grant Palmer (disambiguation), multiple people
- Grant Parker (born 1967), South African professor
- Grant Parker (wrestler) (born 1960), New Zealand wrestler
- Grant Patterson (born 1989), Australian Paralympic swimmer
- Grant Perry (born 1953), New Zealand rugby union footballer
- Grant Petersen, American bicycle designer
- Grant Piro, Australian actor
- Grant Pointer (born 1982), English rugby union footballer
- Grant Potter, American cyclist
- Grant Potulny (born 1980), American ice hockey player

=== Q ===
- Grant Quinlan (born 1998), Canadian stock car racing driver

=== R ===
- Grant Reibel (born 1980), Australian rugby league footballer
- Grant Reuber (1927–2018), Canadian economist
- Grant Reynard (1887–1968), American painter
- Grant Rice (born 1968), Australian cyclist
- Grant A. Rice, American theatrical producer
- Grant Richards (disambiguation), multiple people
- Grant Richison (born 1967), American ice hockey player
- Grant Riller (born 1997), American basketball player
- Grant Rix (born 1965), Australian rugby league footballer
- Grant Roberts (born 1977), American baseball player
- Grant L. Roberts, Canadian bodybuilder
- Grant Robertson (born 1971), New Zealand politician
- Grant Robicheaux, American surgeon
- Grant Robins (born 1969), English swimmer
- Grant Robinson (disambiguation), multiple people
- Grant Robison (born 1978), American runner
- Grant Roden (born 1980), Australian cricketer
- Grant Roelofsen (born 1996), South African cricketer
- Grant Rohach (born 1994), American football player
- Grant Rosenberg, American novelist
- Grant Rosenmeyer (born 1991), American actor
- Grant Rovelli (born 1983), Australian rugby league footballer
- Grant Russ, Filipino cricketer
- Grant Russell, American football player

=== S ===
- Grant Saacks, South African tennis player
- Grant Sabatier (born 1984), American author
- Grant Sampson (born 1982), South African darts player
- Grant Sasser (born 1964), American ice hockey player
- Grant Sawyer (1918–1996), American politician
- Grant B. Schley (1845–1917), American financier
- Grant Schmidt (born 1948), Canadian politician
- Grant Schofield, New Zealand footballer
- Grant Schreiber (born 1967), South African publisher
- Grant Schubert (born 1980), Australian hockey player
- Grant Scicluna (born 1980), Australian film director
- Grant Serpell (born 1944), British musician
- Grant Shapps (born 1968), British politician
- Grant Sharman, New Zealand Paralympic rugby player
- Grant Shaud (born 1960), American actor
- Grant Shaw (born 1984), Canadian football player
- Grant Sheehan, New Zealand photographer
- Grant Sheen (born 1974), English cricketer
- Grant Sheppard (born 1972), English cricketer
- Grant Sherfield (born 1999), American basketball player
- Grant Shiells (born 1989), Scottish rugby union footballer
- Grant Short Bull (1851–1935), American chief
- Grant Show (born 1962), American actor
- Grant Showerman (1870–1935), American scholar
- Grant Sikes, American internet celebrity
- Grant Silcock (born 1975), Australian tennis player
- Grant Simmer (born 1957), Australian sailor
- Grant Simmons (disambiguation), multiple people
- Grant Singer (born 1985), American music director
- Grant C. Sisson (1885–1956), American politician
- Grant Sitton (born 1993), American basketball player
- Grant Smillie (born 1977), Australian music producer
- Grant Smith (disambiguation), multiple people
- Grant Solomon (born 1995), American tennis player
- Grant Sonnex, British furniture designer
- Grant Sorensen (born 1982), Australian volleyball player
- Grant Stafford (born 1971), South African tennis player
- Grant Standbrook (born 1937), Canadian ice hockey player
- Grant Starrett, American real estate developer
- Grant Stauffer (1888–1949), American railroad executive
- Grant Stevens (disambiguation), multiple people
- Grant Stevenson (born 1981), Canadian ice hockey player
- Grant Stewart (disambiguation), multiple people
- Grant Stinnett, American bassist
- Grant Stockdale (1915–1963), American businessman and diplomat
- Grant Stoelwinder, Australian swimming coach
- Grant Stone, Australian librarian
- Grant Stoneman (born 1995), American soccer player
- Grant Stott (born 1967), Scottish broadcaster
- Grant Strate (1927–2015), Canadian dancer
- Grant Stuard (born 1997), American football player
- Grant Stuart (born 1975), Australian rugby league footballer
- Grant Sullivan (disambiguation), multiple people
- Grant Supaphongs (born 1976), Thai racing driver
- Grant Robert Sutherland (born 1945), Australian geneticist

=== T ===
- Grant Tambling (1943–2025), Australian politician
- Grant Tanner (born 1970), Australian rules footballer
- Grant Taylor (disambiguation), multiple people
- Grant Tennille, (born 1968 or 1969), American politician
- Grant Thatcher (1877–1936), American baseball player
- Grant Thomas (disambiguation), multiple people
- Grant Thomson (born 1988), South African cricketer
- Grant Thornton (cricketer) (born 1992), English cricketer
- Grant Thorogood, Australian rugby league footballer
- Grant Tierney (born 1961), Scottish footballer
- Grant Tilly (1937–2012), New Zealand actor
- Grant F. Timmerman (1919–1944), American marine
- Grant Tinker (1926–2016), American television executive
- Grant Hendrik Tonne (born 1976), German politician
- Grant Tregoning (born 1988), New Zealand racing driver
- Grant Tremblay (born 1984), American astrophysicist
- Grant Trindall, Australian rugby league footballer
- Grant Tullar (1869–1950), American minister
- Grant Turner (disambiguation), multiple people

=== U ===
- Grant Udinski (born 1996), American football coach
- Grant Underwood, American historian

=== V ===
- Grant Van De Casteele (born 1991), American soccer player
- Grant van Heerden (born 1969), South African cricketer
- Grant Venerable, American professor

=== W ===
- Grant Wacker (born 1945), American historian
- Grant Wahl (1974–2022), American journalist
- Grant Waite (born 1964), New Zealand golfer
- Grant Wallace (1867–1954), American journalist
- Grant Ward (born 1994), English footballer
- Grant Waterman (born 1971), Australian water polo player
- Grant Watson (1905–1977), Canadian curler
- Grant Watts (born 1973), English footballer
- Grant Weatherstone (1931–2020), Scottish rugby union footballer
- Grant Webb (born 1979), New Zealand rugby union footballer
- Grant Wells (born 2002), American football player
- Grant Wheelhouse, Australian rugby league footballer
- Grant Whitmore (born 1956), Canadian politician
- Grant Whytock (1894–1981), American film editor
- Grant Wiley, American football player
- Grant Wilkinson (born 1974), British gunsmith
- Grant Williams (disambiguation), multiple people
- Grant Wilmot (1956–2016), Australian rules footballer
- Grant Wilson (born 1974), American art director
- Grant M. Wilson (1931–2012), American thermodynamicist
- Grant Wistrom (born 1976), American football player
- Grant Withers (1905–1959), American actor
- Grant Wood (1891–1942), American painter
- Grant Wooden (born 1979), Australian rugby league footballer
- Grant Woodhams (born 1952), Australian politician
- Grant Woods (1954–2021), American attorney and politician

=== Y ===
- Grant David Yeats (1773–1836), English-American physician
- Grant Young (disambiguation), multiple people

== Fictional characters ==
- Grant Ward, a character in the Marvel Cinematic Universe
