= Stannett =

Stannett is a surname. Notable people with the surname include:

- Angelique Stannett (born 1997), Australian rules footballer
- Shane Stannett (born 1966), New Zealand wrestler
- Vivian Stannett (1917–2002), American chemical engineer

== See also ==
- Stennett (surname)
