= McEachran =

McEachran is a surname. Notable people with the surname include:

- Dave McEachran (1903–1983), Scottish footballer
- Duncan McNab McEachran (1841–1924), Canadian veterinarian and academic
- Very Rev Duncan Stewart McEachran (1826-1913), Moderator of the General Assembly of the Presbyterian Church of Victoria
- Grant McEachran (1894–1966), English footballer
- Josh McEachran (born 1993), English footballer
