= Stennett =

Stennett may refer to:

- Stennett, Iowa, U.S., unincorporated community
- Stennett (surname), includes a list of people with the surname
- Stennett H. Brooks, pastor

== See also ==
- Stinnett (disambiguation)
