= Horscroft =

Horscroft is an English surname. Notable people with the surname include:

- Grant Horscroft (born 1961), English footballer
- Scott Horscroft (born 1977), Australian music producer and sound engineer
