= Claremont School of Theology =

Graduate school in Los Angeles, California

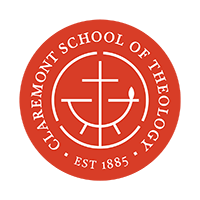
- Seal
- Former name: Maclay School of Theology
- Type: Private graduate school
- Established: 1885
- Accreditation: WSCUC, ATS
- Religious affiliation: United Methodist Church
- Endowment: $850,000 (2025)
- President: Grant J. Hagiya and Jeffrey Kuan
- Academic staff: 10
- Administrative staff: 22
- Students: 175
- Location: Los Angeles, California, United States; 34.06518428428643°N 118.43225225683219°W
- Campus: Suburban
- Colors: Red and White
- Website: cst.edu
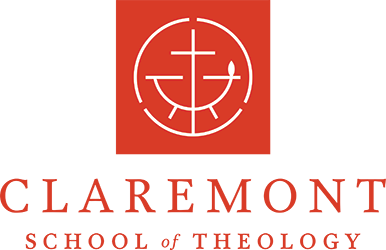

Claremont School of Theology (CST) is a private graduate school focused on religion and theology and located in Los Angeles, California. It is one of the thirteen official theological schools of the United Methodist Church, and also has close relationships with a variety of other faith traditions and Protestant denominations, especially the Disciples of Christ and United Church of Christ, the Episcopal Church, and the Evangelical Lutheran Church in America.

== History ==
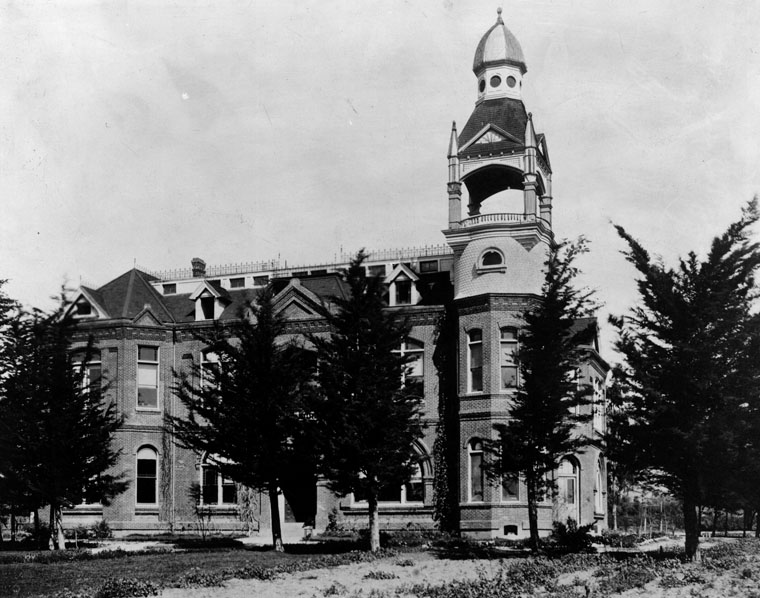
Maclay School of Theology in San Fernando, c. 1890

Founded as the Maclay School of Theology in San Fernando, California, in 1885, the Methodist seminary was founded by Charles Maclay, founder of the town of San Fernando, former Methodist minister and state senator. The school was affiliated with the University of Southern California (USC) from 1900 to 1957, staying on the USC campus until it moved to Claremont in 1957.

The master plan for the Claremont campus was designed by Edward Durell Stone, who also designed the school's Kresge Chapel, listed as an historic building by the LA Conservancy.

In 2008, CST became a founding member of the Claremont University Project, a multi-religious consortium that eventually became Claremont Lincoln University (CLU). In 2014, CST announced the end of its relationship with Claremont Lincoln University. The mutual split resulted from an acknowledgement that both institutions' "fundamental philosophies have diverged" when "Claremont Lincoln decided to move away from its interreligious roots and become a secular-focused university" after CLU announced "a decision to discontinue several of its programs". In the same announcement, CST's board of trustees affirmed a commitment to maintaining relationships with its partner schools (the Academy for Jewish Religion (California) and Bayan Claremont).

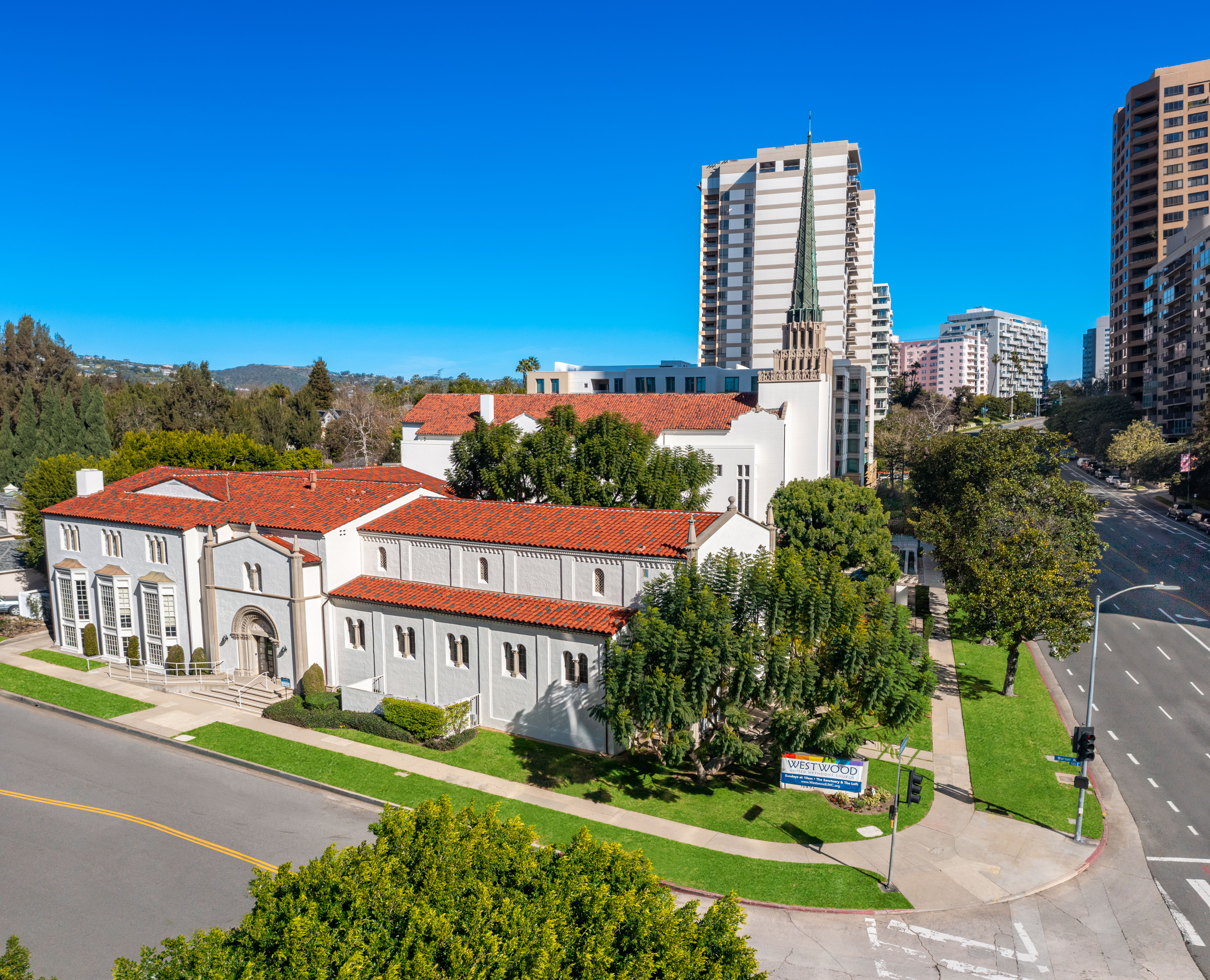
Claremont School of Theology, 2024

In 2015 CST disputed its 1957 agreement with the Claremont Colleges (TCC) that stated that if CST ever sold its Claremont campus, TCC would have the opportunity to purchase the property for pennies on the dollar. Based on an early 1980s California law, CST believed this 1957 restriction was no longer applicable while TCC insisted it remained valid. Both parties entered litigation and in December 2023, CST and TCC completed arbitration.

Before the arbitration was completed, CST began negotiations in 2017 to merge with Willamette University in Salem, Oregon. After signing a memorandum of understanding in May 2019, the school began planning the move to Willamette in July 2020. However, due to the ongoing litigation with TCC, CST was not able to move and in 2021 decided to "maintain its presence in Southern California with its main campus located in Claremont, while also retaining a partnership in Salem with Willamette".

Responding to the increased demand for online education the school announced in 2023 that it would increase its online and hybrid offerings, and move from its 16-acre Claremont location to a more sustainable Los Angeles campus. The school is now on the campus of the Westwood United Methodist Church.

CST was the original home for the Center for Process Studies (CPS). In 2023 the CST Board of Trustees approved a proposal that enabled CPS to establish itself as an independent 501(c)(3) nonprofit, with joint faculty with CST. The CPS promotes a "relational approach" found in process thought, specifically process theology.

== Academics ==
=== Degrees ===
- Master of Divinity (MDiv)
- Master of Arts (MA) in Religion
- Master of Theological Studies (MTS)
- Master of Arts in Ministry, Leadership, and Service (MAMLS)
- Doctor of Ministry (DMin)
- Doctor of Philosophy (PhD) in Practical Theology
- Doctor of Philosophy (PhD) in Religion
- Doctor of Professional Counseling (DPC)
- Doctor of Spirituality (SpD)

=== Research centers ===
- Center for Engaged Compassion
- Center for Sexuality
- The Clinebell Institute
- Process and Faith

=== Other programs ===
Claremont School of Theology hosts the Course of Study and Licensing School programs of the United Methodist Western Jurisdiction. Programs are open to students from any United Methodist Jurisdiction. These programs are for those seeking to become a local pastor in The United Methodist Church.

=== Accreditation ===
The school is accredited by the WASC Senior College and University Commission. As of 2023, the commission had the Claremont School of Theology listed as "Accredited on Probation" related to a commission action from June 2025. The school is also accredited by the Association of Theological Schools in the United States and Canada (ATS). However, its status has been changed to 'Accredited on Probation' due to challenges in financial resources.

== Notable faculty ==
- Jon Berquist
- Jerry D. Campbell (emeritus)
- Philip Clayton
- John B. Cobb (emeritus)
- Monica Coleman (emerita)
- Jane Dempsey Douglass
- Roland Faber
- David Ray Griffin (emeritus)
- Rolf Knierim (emeritus)
- Burton L. Mack (emeritus)
- Dennis R. MacDonald
- James M. Robinson (emeritus)
- Rosemary Radford Ruether
- James A. Sanders (emeritus)
- Deepak Shimkhada (adjunct)
- Marjorie Hewitt Suchocki (emerita)
- Marvin A. Sweeney
- Ann Taves

== Notable alumni ==
- David Augsburger (1938−2003), Mennonite pastor
- Tripp Fuller, broadcaster
- Antonio Gallardo Lucena, Episcopal bishop
- Thomas Jay Oord (1965−), theologian and philosopher
- Mary Elizabeth Moore, theologian
- Cecil Murray (1929−2024), theologian
- Rosemary Radford Ruether (1936−2022), Catholic theologian
- Rizi Timane, musician and minister
- Robert B. "Bobs" Watson (1930−1999), actor and Methodist minister
- Michel Weber (1963−), philosopher
