= Claremont Lincoln University =

American online graduate university

Coordinates: 34.0944°N 117.7158°W

- Motto: Socially Conscious Education
- Type: Private online university
- Established: 2011; 15 years ago
- Accreditation: WSCUC
- Affiliations: NAICU; AICCU
- President: Lynn Priddy
- Location: Claremont, California, United States
- Campus: Online
- Colors: Green and blue
- Website: www.claremontlincoln.edu

Claremont Lincoln University (CLU) is a private, non-profit online university in Claremont, California.

== History ==
In March 2008, the board of trustees at Claremont School of Theology voted to establish a university focused on interfaith dialogue. The purpose of the "University Project" was to create an educational environment in which representatives of the world's religions could study together and address key social problems – including religious violence. The Claremont School of Theology board incorporated the university in January 2010. The name of the university was revealed on May 16, 2011, and classes launched in fall 2011. The founding president was Jerry D. Campbell.

In spring 2014, the university decided to shift beyond its original inter-religious focus. It began creating educational programs and degrees that built on its commitment to its core tenets of fostering collaboration, civil dialogue, and addressing key social problems, but did not depend on faith, spirituality, or religion to achieve. As a result, Claremont Lincoln and Claremont School of Theology decided to separate and students whose programs were discontinued by Claremont Lincoln were offered admission to Claremont School of Theology where they were able to complete their degrees. Claremont Lincoln then began to work toward independent accreditation which it achieved in 2016.

In 2021, CLU appointed Lynn Priddy president of the university. Priddy succeeded Tony Digiovanni, who had been president since 2019.

== Socially conscious education ==
Claremont Lincoln University's slogan is "socially conscious education." The university develops curriculum that builds on the fundamentals of "Claremont core," a set of skills and practices that the university believes students should have after graduation: mindfulness, dialog, collaboration, and change. In addition to the core, the university aligns its degree programs with socially conscious post-graduate goals.

In 2020, Claremont Lincoln University and the Lincoln Institute of Land Policy (LILP) announced a partnership to advance its Masters in Public Administration (MPA) program. The partnership included $100,000 in scholarships/fellowships for incoming students in the masters program to offset the cost of tuition. LILP president and CEO George W. "Mac" McCarthy stated: "We are inspired by the passion of our future leaders, and believe an MPA degree from Claremont Lincoln University will empower them to effectively address challenges such as social inequity, fiscal stress, and climate change in their communities."

In response to a combination of global social and economic challenges (including the COVID-19 pandemic and rising student loan debts for college degrees), the university announced in 2021 that it would be reducing the cost of its tuition for students by 21%. The tuition reduction was meant to ensure that the university demonstrated its commitment to "more affordable, inclusive and accessible" degree programs.

== Academic programs ==
Claremont Lincoln University is accredited by the WASC Senior College and University Commission (WSCUC) to offer the Master of Arts.
