= Grant Schreiber =

South African author, publisher and editor

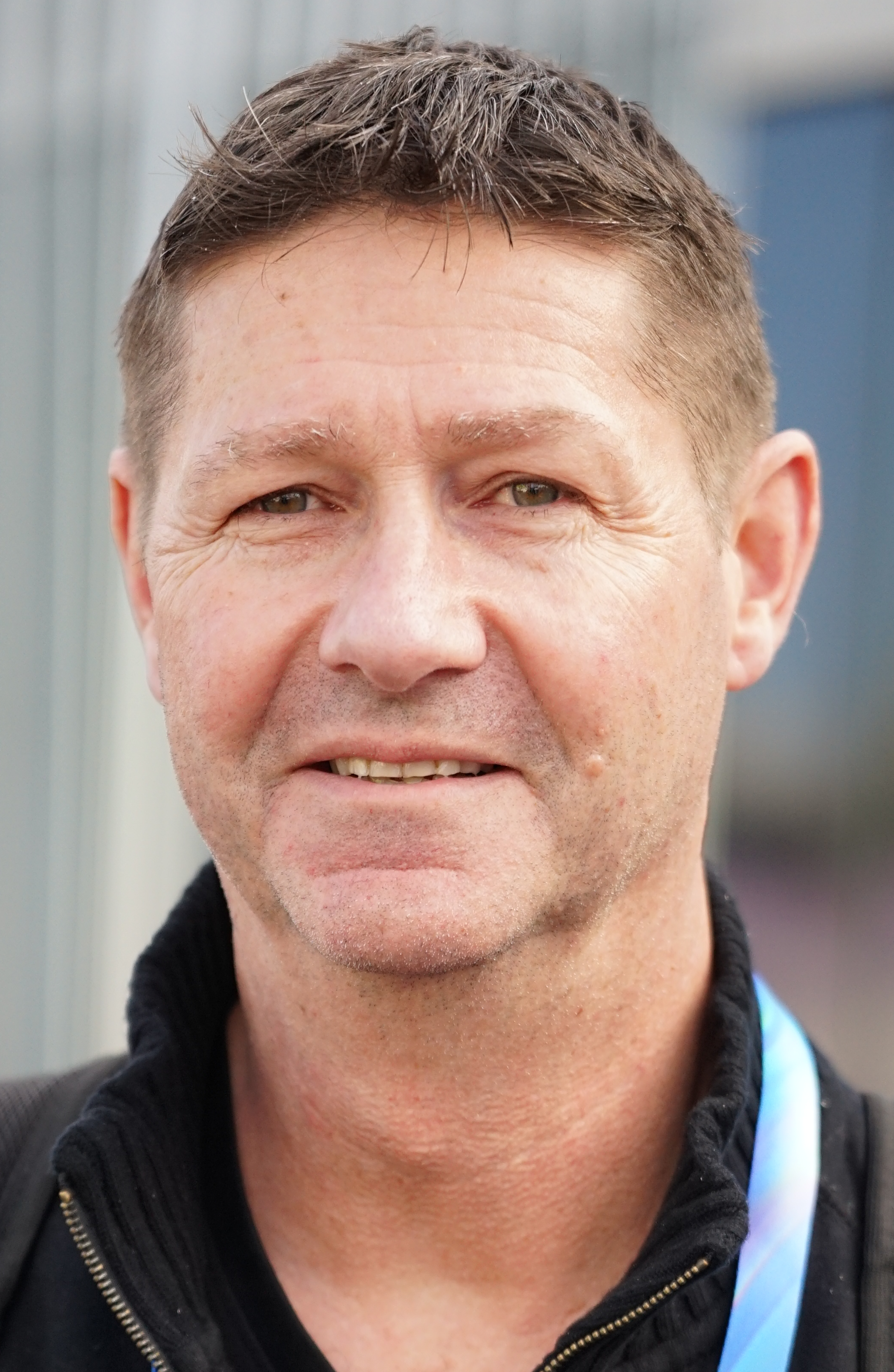
- Schreiber at CES 2026
- Born: 8 October 1967 (age 59); Cape Town, South Africa
- Education: University of Cape Town
- Occupations: Publisher, editor, author

Grant Schreiber (born Cape Town 1967) is a South African publisher, author and editor. He is the founding editor of Real Leaders, a leadership magazine that focuses exclusively on sustainability and ethical business. In 2023, he was appointed Global Campaign Manager for a United Nations campaign on human security. He is currently the General Manager of the World Academy of Art and Science, an organization founded in 1960 by eminent scientists and intellectuals such as Albert Einstein, J. Robert Oppenheimer and Bertrand Russell that serves a global network of scientists, artists, thinkers, and political and social leaders to address global challenges.

He is known for interviewing influential figures and celebrities such as Sharon Stone, Desmond Tutu, Sara Blakely, Dr. Gindi, Sheryl Sandberg and Warren Buffett. Originally started as a members-only magazine for members of the Young Presidents' Organization (YPO) Schreiber relaunched Real Leaders as a mainstream title at Barnes & Noble, New York in September 2017.

He is the author of a series of best-selling books in South Africa, that explore dark subject matter with humor, the first of which was: Is It Just Me Or Is Everything Kak? in 2007 and Complete Kak in 2011. He cofounded a book imprint in 2002 called Two Dogs and collaborated with South African authors in writing books for men. The books started a trend in South Africa, of books that tackled serious social issues with irreverent humor.

In 2003 he was asked by the South African Government to redesign the new parliamentary mace, that replaced the old version used by the apartheid government. His artistic work on the mace is seen as a symbolic break with the past and a reinterpretation of national imagery, more suited to the post-1994 democratic elections, when Nelson Mandela was voted in as president.

From 1986 to1989 Schreiber was a member of the Gardens Media Group, a group of activist artists from the University of Cape Town that produced posters and graphic designs for anti-apartheid organizations. His screen-printed poster on the theme of workers’ rights was exhibited at the Museum of Modern Art (MOMA) New York in March 2011 — “Impressions from South Africa, 1965 to Now” — and forms part of the MOMA permanent collection.

He was interviewed by Forbes in 2017. His opinions and writing have appeared in The New York Public Library, Inc. and The Baltimore Sun.
