= Grant Campbell =

Grant Campbell may refer to:

- Grant Campbell (musician) (born 1979), British singer-songwriter
- Grant Campbell (Canadian politician) (1922–2008), Canadian Member of Parliament
- Grant Campbell (American politician), North Carolina state legislator
