= Grant Williams =

Grant Williams may refer to:

- Grant Williams (actor) (1931–1985), American actor
- Grant Williams (American football) (born 1974), American football player
- Grant Williams (footballer) (born 1969), Australian football player
- Grant Williams (rugby union) (born 1996), South African rugby player
- Grant Williams (basketball) (born 1998), American basketball player
- Grant Williams (racing driver) (born 1975), Welsh racing driver
- Grant R. Williams (1930–1964), US Navy test pilot
