= Grant Anderson =

Grant Anderson may refer to:

- Grant Anderson (baseball) (born 1997), American baseball player
- Grant Anderson (footballer) (born 1986), Scottish footballer
- Grant Anderson (Highland games), Scottish weightlifter and Highland Games competitor
- Grant Anderson (rugby league, born 1969), rugby league footballer of the 1980s and 1990s
- Grant Anderson (rugby union, born August 1989), Scotland 7s international rugby union player
- Grant Anderson (rugby union, born September 1989), English rugby union player
- Grant Anderson (rugby league, born 1999), Australian rugby league player

== See also ==
- J. Grant Anderson (1897–1985), Scottish actor, writer, and theatre director
