= Jerry D. Campbell =

American educator and university administrator

- Education: McMurry College (BA); Duke University (MDiv); University of North Carolina at Chapel Hill (MSLS); University of Denver (PhD)
- Occupations: Educator, librarian, university administrator
- Known for: President of Claremont School of Theology; founding president of Claremont Lincoln University; Dean of University Libraries and Chief Information Officer at the University of Southern California
- Spouse: LaVeta Dea Sinclair Campbell (died 2010)
- Children: 1

Jerry D. Campbell is a former educator, librarian, and university administrator who served as the 6th president of Claremont School of Theology and the founding president of Claremont Lincoln University.

== Education ==
Campbell earned a B.A. from McMurry College in 1968, an M.Div. from Duke University in 1971, and an M.S.L.S. from the University of North Carolina at Chapel Hill in 1972. He completed a Ph.D. in American history at the University of Denver in 1982, with a dissertation titled Biblical Criticism in America 1858–1929: The Emergence of the Historical Critic.

== Career ==
Campbell began his career at the Iliff School of Theology, where he worked as a cataloger and later as director of technical services. He also contributed to early library automation efforts.

He served as director of the Bridwell Library at Southern Methodist University from 1980 to 1985. He was elected for the one-year term of president of the American Theological Library Association from 1981 to 1982. In 1985 he joined Duke University as Vice Provost for Library Affairs and University Librarian, later also serving as Vice Provost for Computing. While at Duke, Campbell published articles on library budgeting and reference services, including "Shaking the Conceptual Foundations of Reference" in 1992.

Campbell became Dean of University Libraries at the University of Southern California in 1996 and subsequently served as Chief Information Officer and University Librarian. During his tenure at USC he oversaw a $17 million renovation of the Doheny Library.

In 2006 he was appointed President of the Claremont School of Theology (CST). He has stated that his experience managing technological change, faculty relationships, and limited financial resources in libraries prepared him for university administration. Contemporary reports described CST as facing declining enrollment, financial difficulties, and accreditation problems when Campbell was appointed president.

Campbell and the CST Board of Trustees later developed plans for a multifaith university. Claremont Lincoln University was established as part of that effort. Campbell became president of CLU in 2011, the year that its name was unveiled and students started attending classes. During this time, Campbell participated in local and international ecumenical conferences and made public statements about the importance of religious pluralism.

In 2013, Campbell retired from the presidency of both Claremont School of Theology and Claremont Lincoln University, citing health issues.

== Personal life ==
Campbell was married to LaVeta Dea Sinclair Campbell until her death in 2010. Together they had one child.

== Selected publications ==
- "Shaking the Conceptual Foundations of Reference". Reference Services Review. 20 (4): 29–35. 1992.
- "Choosing to Have a Future". American Libraries. 24 (6): 560–566. 1993. JSTOR 25632942.
- "Getting Comfortable with Change: A New Budget Model for Libraries in Transition". Library Trends. 42 (3): 448. January 1994.
- "Building Xanadu: Creating the New Library Paradise". Collection Management. 22 (3/4): 31–40. May 1998.
- "Changing a Cultural Icon: The Academic Library as a Virtual Destination" (PDF). EDUCAUSE Review. 41 (1): 16–30. January–February 2006.
- "Still Shaking the Conceptual Foundations of Reference: A Perspective". The Reference Librarian. 48 (2): 21–24. 2007. doi:10.1300/J120v48n02_05.
