= Disciples Seminary Foundation =

Protestant theological organization

Coordinates: 34°06′24″N 117°43′08″W

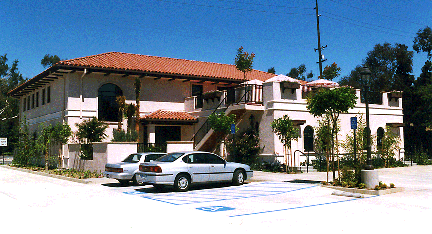
Disciples-Seminary Foundation Claremont Building

Disciples Seminary Foundation is a theological institution affiliated with the Christian Church (Disciples of Christ) and located near the campus of Claremont School of Theology in Claremont, California. It has partnerships with CST as well as Iliff School of Theology, Pacific School of Religion, and San Francisco Theological Seminary. The foundation cultivates church leadership by providing scholarships to seminary and graduate students for theological education at the partner schools. Its assets total $15,221,980.
