= Stinnett =

Stinnett may refer to:

== Places ==
In the United States:

- Stinnett, Kentucky
- Stinnett, Texas
- Stinnett, Wisconsin

== People with the surname ==
- Bobbie Jo Stinnett (1981-2004), American murder victim
- Christina Stinnett, Micronesian activist and businesswoman
- Grant Stinnett, American bassist
- Kelly Stinnett, baseball player
- Melanie Stinnett, American politician
- Robert Stinnett, sailor and writer
- Sandra Stinnett, American statistician
- Tom Stinnett, American politician
- William Stinnett, Guam basketball player

== See also ==
- Stennett (disambiguation)
