= Association of Theatrical Press Agents & Managers =

IATSE affiliated local union

- Abbreviation: ATPAM
- Predecessor: Theatrical Press Representatives of America (TPROA)
- Established: 1928; 98 years ago
- Founder: Theodore Mitchell
- Founded at: New York City
- Merger of: Yiddish Theatrical Agents and Treasurers (YTAT)
- Type: Trade union
- Purpose: press agents and theatre managers
- Headquarters: 14 Penn Plaza; Suite 1407; New York, New York 10122
- Region served: United States & Canada
- Methods: Collective bargaining, apprenticeships
- Members: 770 (2025)
- President: Lizbeth Cone
- Vice President: Jim Byk
- Secretary-Treasurer: Rina L. Saltzman
- Parent organization: International Alliance of Theatrical Stage Employees (IATSE)
- Affiliations: New York City Central Labor Council (NYC CLC)
- Award: David Gersten Scholarship
- Website: www.atpam.com
- Formerly called: Association of Theatrical Agents and Managers (ATAM)

The Association of Theatrical Press Agents & Managers (ATPAM) is an American union organization for press agents and theatre managers on Broadway, off Broadway, touring shows, and regional venues.

ATPAM received a charter from the American Federation of Labor (AFL) in 1928. They have been part of the International Alliance of Theatrical Stage Employees since 1937.

== Selected members ==
- Mark Bramble
- Adrian Bryan-Brown
- Alan Eichler
- Grant A. Rice
