= Team Graner–Stradalli =

Pro-cycling team from the USA

Team information
- Registered: United States
- Founded: 2013
- Discipline: Road
- Bicycles: Stradalli Cycle

Team Graner–Stradalli is a pro cycling team formed by Stradalli Cycle with sponsorship from Graner Law and Jaco Clothing. The team is made up of four seasoned pro riders along with four developmental juniors.

== History ==
=== Team beginnings: 2013 ===
The team is a collaboration between Stradalli Cycles and World Master's champion, Grant Potter, who was approach to establish a new pro cycling team. The team's main goals are to race healthy and happy while educating cyclists on how to race but have fun and respect others in the cycling community. The team is sponsored by Graner Law and Jaco Clothing.

== Team roster ==
As of February 1, 2013.

Rider	Date of birth
Grant Potter (USA)
Ken Vida (USA)
Steve Mlujeak (USA)
Curtis Long (USA)
