= Mary Elizabeth Moore =

American educator and theological administrator

Mary Elizabeth (Mullino) Moore is an educator, writer, and former dean of the Boston University School of Theology in Boston, Massachusetts. She has also been a professor of religion and education at the Claremont School of Theology, as well as Emory University, where she served as the director of the Women in Theology and Ministry Program. Moore has written on topics of socio-economic justice, and socio-ecological renewal, and throughout her career has significantly contributed to the dialogue between theology and education.

== Biography ==
Mary Elizabeth Mullino was born to James Ogle Mullino and Elizabeth Heaton in Baton Rouge, Louisiana. After graduating with a B.A. and M.A. from Southern Methodist University in 1968, Moore earned a Ph.D. from the Claremont School of Theology. In 1976, she married Allen Moore, with whom she parented five children.

Moore is an ordained deacon in the United Methodist Church. On January 1, 2009, she succeeded Ray L. Hart as Dean of Boston University School of Theology. She is the first woman to hold the position of dean at the Boston University School of Theology, and is the fifth woman to hold a presidential role at a United Methodist Church theological school.

== Publications ==
=== Books ===
- Education for Continuity and Change: A New Model for Christian Religious Education (1983)
- Teaching from the Heart: Theology and Educational Method (1991)
- Ministering with the Earth (1998)
- Teaching from the Heart: Theology and Educational Method (1998)
- Covenant and Call: Mission of the Future Church (2000)
- Teaching as a Sacramental Act (2004)
- So Much to Love, So Much to Lose (2023)

=== Co-edited Volumes ===
- Hermeneutics and Empirical Research in Practical Theology (2004)
- Children, Youth, and Spirituality in a Troubling World (2008)
- A Living Tradition: Critical Recovery and Reconstruction of Wesleyan Heritage (2013)

Moore has published more than 50 articles and book chapters since 1982.
