= Grant Horsfield =

Grant Horsfield, also known as the naked guy, is an entrepreneur from South Africa. In 2007 he founded the naked Retreat and currently holds the position of chairman and founder of the naked Group.

== Early life ==
He lost his father when he was 12 and grew up on a farm. His mother had to raise him and his 4 siblings

== Career ==
Grant worked in England and South Africa for more than 10 years. With a background in IT, he launched e-Bites Limited publishing company in 2000. In 2004, Grant received an MBA from University of Cape Town Graduate School of Business.

He moved to China in 2005 and in 2007 he founded naked Retreats which later became part of naked Group. In 2015 he founded naked Hub which later expanded to 50 locations across China, Vietnam, Australia and the UK. The naked Hub became one of the biggest co-working space operators in China.

In 2009 he wrote and published a book titled “The Poverty Penalty – The Price of Being Poor”. This study examines the lives of the poor in relation to those more fortunate. In particular, it looks into the injustices the poor are forced to face when trying to escape poverty

== Personal life ==
Grant is married to Hong Kong born architect and designer, Delphine Yip-Horsfield who is also a co-chairman of naked Group. They have three children, Arabella Leslie Horsfield, Alexandra Lynn Horsfield, and Azania Lion Horsfield. In 2020, the family went on a trip to sail around the world, which ended after 4 years in 2024. He is among the richest foreigners in China.
