= Grant Potter =

American road bicycle racer

Personal information
- Full name: Grant Potter
- Born: USA
- Weight: 196 lb (89 kg; 14.0 st)

Cycling career
- Sport: Cycling
- Current team: Team Graner-Stradalli
- Discipline: Road
- Role: Rider

Professional teams
- 2010-2011: Z-Motion Pro
- 2013: Team Graner-Stradalli

Major wins
- One-day races and Classics 2010 Worlds Masters Stage Race Champion 2009 National Masters U.S. champion 2012 World Masters Stage Race Champion

Grant Potter is an American road bicycle racer, from Florida. Potter was the gold medalist of the 2010 Worlds Masters Stage Race, 2009 U.S. Masters National Champion, 2010 UCI Worlds top 5 finisher, 2010 Deutschlandsberg Worlds TT winner among many other titles.

Grant is currently the team captain of the 2013 Team Graner-Stradalli.
