= Grant M. Wilson =

American thermodynamicist

Grant McDonald Wilson (May 24, 1931 – September 10, 2012) was a notable American thermodynamicist. He is widely known to the fields of chemical engineering and physical chemistry for having developed the Wilson equation, one of the first attempts of practical importance to model nonideal behavior in liquid mixtures as observed in practice with common polar compounds such as alcohols, amines, etc. The equation has been in use in all commercial chemical process simulators to predict phase behavior and produce safe process designs of commercial and environmental protection importance to the chemical industry. He founded the company Wilco (now Wiltec) in 1977 to research, measure, commercialize, and publish thermophysical property data for numerous chemical mixtures of interest to the industry. The Journal of Chemical & Engineering Data published a posthumous issue in honor of Wilson in April 2014 in recognition of his contributions to the field.

== Biography ==
Wilson was born in Colonia Pacheco, Chihuahua (one of the Mormon colonies in Mexico). He did his undergraduate work at BYU in 1953 and then attended and graduated from Massachusetts Institute of Technology (MIT) with a PhD in physical chemistry in 1957.

While at MIT he began his career by developing one of the first computer-based activity coefficient equations. Known as the Wilson Equation, it is one of the most widely used equations in the field of industrial thermodynamics for the prediction of phase equilibria.

Wilson has been a research scientist measuring and reporting physical properties and phase equilibria data for most of his career. He joined Shell Research and Development in California upon graduating from MIT, he then joined Air Products and later moved to PVT Inc. of Houston, Texas. While there he performed a number of Research Projects for the Gas Processors Association. At this time he also did work with cubic equations of state (EOS), he was one of the first to modify the alpha form of the Redlich-Kwong EOS to better represent pure component vapor pressures.

He next taught at BYU in Provo, Utah, from 1970 to 1978 while there he was a part of the on-campus research group, the Thermochemical Institute founded by Profs. James J. Christensen and Reed M. Izatt. Wilson left BYU to create the company Wilco (now Wiltec) Research Company in 1977 which measured data for the Chemical Process Industries (CPI).

The Wilson equation was published by Grant M. Wilson as "Vapor-Liquid Equilibrium. XI. A New Expression for the Excess Free Energy of Mixing" in the Journal of the American Chemical Society 86:127-130, 1964.

Wilson and his wife, Reta Raphiel were married in the Logan Temple on September 18, 1950. Together in 2002, they served as missionaries for the Church of Jesus Christ of Latter-day Saints in Bangalore, India for two years.

Wilson died on September 10, 2012, in Orem, Utah.
