= Grant Anderson (rugby union, born September 1989) =

English rugby union player

- Born: Grant Anderson; 13 September 1989 (age 36)

Rugby union career
- Position(s): Centre, Wing
Senior career
Years	Team	Apps	(Points)
–	Northampton Saints		

Grant Anderson (born 13 September 1989) is an English rugby union who played for Northampton Saints in the Guinness Premiership.

He plays as a centre or wing.
