= Grant Hampton =

Example association football player

Personal information
- Full name: Grant Hampton
- Date of birth: March 27, 2003 (age 23)
- Place of birth: Georgia, United States
- Height: 5 ft 6 in (1.68 m)
- Position: Midfielder

Team information
- Current team: Mercer Bears
- Number: 28

Youth career
- Tormenta

College career
Years	Team	Apps	(Gls)
2021–	Mercer Bears	0	(0)

Senior career*
Years	Team	Apps	(Gls)
2021	Tormenta 2	8	(0)
2021	Tormenta	1	(0)
- * Club domestic league appearances and goals as of 19:29, 30 May 2021 (UTC)

Grant Hampton (born March 27, 2003) is an American soccer player who plays as a midfielder for Mercer Bears.

== Club career ==
Born in Georgia, Hampton was raised in Chatham County and played high school soccer with Islands High School. On January 9, 2020, he signed a USL academy contract with USL League One club Tormenta. The contract allowed him to play professionally while retaining his college soccer eligibility. Due to the COVID-19 pandemic delaying the USL League One season and cancelling the USL League Two season, Hampton did not make an appearance during 2020 season.

Prior to the 2021 season, Hampton re-signed with Tormenta on a USL academy contract. On May 11, 2021, Hampton signed with Tormenta's USL League Two reserve side Tormenta 2. He made his debut for the side that same day in the season opener against Southern Soccer Academy, coming on as a 62nd-minute substitute in the 3–1 victory.

On May 29, 2021, Hampton made his senior debut in the league against Forward Madison, coming on as an 85th-minute substitute in the 1–3 defeat.

In the fall of 2021, Hampton moved to play college soccer at Mercer University.

== Career statistics ==
As of match played May 29, 2021

Appearances and goals by club, season and competition
Club	Season	League			National Cup		Continental		Total	
Club	Season	Division	Apps	Goals	Apps	Goals	Apps	Goals	Apps	Goals
Tormenta 2	2021	USL League Two	2	0	—		—		2	0
Tormenta	2021	USL League One	1	0	—		—		1	0
Career total			3	0	0	0	0	0	3	0
