= Grant Sullivan =

Grant Sullivan may refer to:

- Grant Sullivan (cricketer) (born 1984), former Australian cricketer
- Grant Sullivan (actor), American actor
