= Grant Tennille =

American politician

Chair of the Arkansas Democratic Party
- Incumbent
- Assumed office October 2, 2021
- Preceded by: Nicole Hart (acting)

Personal details
- Born: 1968 or 1969 (age 55–56)
- Political party: Democratic
- Spouse: Rebecca
- Children: 3
- Education: Kenyon College (BA)

Grant Tennille (born 1968 or 1969) is an American politician serving as the chair of the Arkansas Democratic Party. He was elected on October 2, 2021, and the previously elected chair was Michael John Gray, who had resigned to become the executive director of a political group.

== Career ==
Before becoming the Democratic chair, Tennille served as an unpaid advisor to Mayor of Little Rock Frank Scott Jr.. He was also head of the Arkansas Economic Development Commission under Governor Beebe. Before his advisory work, he worked as a reporter for the Arkansas Democrat-Gazette. In January 2023, Tennille announced he would not run for a second term, citing financial difficulties, but changed his mind and was reelected.

Party political offices
Preceded by Nicole Hart; Acting	Chair of the Arkansas Democratic Party; 2022–present	Incumbent
