= Grant Thomas =

Grant Thomas may refer to:

- Grant Thomas (politician) (born 1941), New Zealand politician
- Grant Thomas (footballer) (born 1958), Australian rules footballer and former coach of St Kilda
