= Grant Mitton =

Grant Mitton may refer to:

- Grant Mitton (field hockey), Australian field hockey player
- Grant Mitton (politician) (born 1941), Canadian radio talk show host and politician
