= Grant Johnson =

Grant Johnson may refer to:

- Home Run Johnson (Grant Johnson, 1872–1963), American baseball player
- Grant Johnson (footballer) (born 1972), Scottish former footballer
- Grant A. Johnson, American television soap opera director
- Grant S. Johnson, American screenwriter, film director, and producer
- Grant W. Johnson (1903–1965), American politician who served in the New York State Assembly

== See also ==
- Johnson Grant (1773–1844), Scottish divine
