= Grant Gillespie =

Grant Gillespie may refer to:

- Grant Gillespie (footballer) (born 1991), Scottish footballer
- Grant Gillespie (writer), English novelist and actor
