= Grant Lauchlan =

Grant Lauchlan is a Scottish entertainment journalist, producer and presenter, best known for his long-running work with STV, where he became one of the country’s most recognisable film and entertainment presenters.

After studying journalism at the University of Stirling, Lauchlan began his career as a reporter at Radio Clyde in 1998, before moving into television as an Assistant Producer with STV’s digital channel S2. He quickly established himself as an on-screen talent, becoming the film and entertainment reporter for Scotland Today and later a familiar face in STV’s newsroom.

Lauchlan is the creator and driving force behind Moviejuice, a popular film show he pitched, produced and fronted. Originally running from 2001 to 2006, the brand returned for a series of high-profile specials (Twilight, Skyfall, Prometheus) and a successful re-launch in 2012, cementing his reputation as one of Scotland’s leading entertainment broadcasters.

Lauchlan has interviewed many of the biggest names in Hollywood, including Meryl Streep, Leonardo DiCaprio, Julie Andrews, Sandra Bullock, Angelina Jolie, George Clooney and screen legends like Sean Connery and Christpher Lee. "Die Hard" superstar Bruce Willis has singled him out as one of the best interviewers he’s worked with.

Following his departure from STV in 2018 after 20 years with the broadcaster, Lauchlan expanded into property development while continuing to contribute to UK entertainment media, including the BBC and the Daily Record. He has also undertaken voice-over work and corporate hosting engagements.
