= Grant Stewart =

Grant Stewart may refer to:

- Grant Stewart (musician) (born 1971), Canadian jazz saxophonist
- Grant Stewart (cricketer) (born 1994), Australian cricketer
- Grant Stewart (rugby union) (born 1995), Scottish rugby union player
