= Grant Golden =

Grant Golden may refer to:

- Grant Golden (tennis)
- Grant Golden (basketball)
