= Grant Gordy =

American guitarist

- Born: Eugene, Oregon, U.S.
- Genres: Progressive bluegrass, folk, chamber jazz
- Occupation: Musician
- Instrument: Guitar
- Years active: 2004–present
- Labels: Compass, Tone Rogue

Grant Gordy is an American guitarist and educator based in New York City. He played in the David Grisman Quintet and he is currently a member of Mr Sun with Darol Anger, Joe K. Walsh and Aidan O’Donnell.

Grant Gordy began teaching himself to play at age 13 after being gifted an acoustic guitar by his father. In 2006 he was auditioned and was selected alongside 14 other young musicians to participate in Edgar Meyer’s “Porous Borders of Music” Carnegie Hall professional training workshop. The program commenced with a concert at Carnegie’s Zankel Hall, where Grant debuted 2 of his compositions. In 2007 he joined the David Grisman Quintet/Sextet and toured with the DGQ until 2013. He has toured with Tony Trischka, Andy Statman, Danny Barnes, Karan Casey and Matt Flinner and has recorded with Jacob Jolliff, Ross Martin, and Jayme Stone. In 2013 he founded the band Mr Sun with Darol Anger, Joe K. Walsh and bassist Karl Doty. Doty left the band and was later replaced by Ethan Jodziewicz, and later by current bassist Aidan O’Donnell. In 2022 Grant Gordy (along with duo partner Ross Martin) was awarded a grant through Chamber Music America’s Presenter Consortium for Jazz program, funded through the Doris Duke Charitable Foundation.

== Discography ==
=== As Leader/co-leader ===
- 2010 Grant Gordy
- 2015 The People Need Light (with Mr Sun, Compass Records)
- 2016 Year of the Dog (with Ross Martin)
- 2020 Interpreter
- 2021 Bluegrass and the Abstract Truth (with Greg Garrison, Alex Hargreaves and Joe K. Walsh)
- 2022 Our Delight' (with Jacob Jolliff) (debuted at #10 on Billboard Bluegrass chart)
- 2022 Extrovert (with Mr Sun, Compass Records)
- 2023 Peripheral Visions

=== As a Sideman ===
- 2008 Jayme Stone and Mansa Sissoko: Africa to Appalachia
- 2010 Alex Hargreaves: Prelude
- 2010 Jayme Stone: Room of Wonders
- 2010 David Grisman Quintet: Live at Bonnaroo DVD
- 2011 David Grisman Quintet: Live at the Count Basie Theater
- 2011 Jake Schepps: An Evening in the Village: the Music of Bela Bartok
- 2012 Emy Phelps: Look Up, Look Down
- 2013 Miranda Sykes and Rex Preston: Sing a Full Song
- 2018 Sam Reider: Too Hot to Sleep
- 2018 Darol Anger and Emy Phelps: Music of Our People
