= Grant Richards =

Grant Richards may refer to:

- Grant Richards (publisher) (1872–1948), British publisher and writer
- Grant Richards (publishing house), founded in 1897 by the publisher
- Grant Richards (actor) (1911–1963), American actor

== See also ==
- Richard Grant (disambiguation)
