= Grant A. Rice =

American theatrical producer

Grant A. Rice is an American theatrical producer, manager, and consultant.

== Biography ==
Grant A. Rice has produced, managed, and consulted on over 60 theatrical productions around the world.

He graduated with honors in Theatre Arts from McDaniel College in Westminster, Maryland, and received his MFA in Theatrical Management and Producing from Columbia University in New York City.

Rice began producing at the Theatre on the Hill, located northwest of Baltimore, Maryland.

Rice won an ACTF Kennedy Center award for “Excellence in Theatrical Lighting Design” for the production of Loose Ends.

Rice is a founding member of CoProducers (a commercial producing organization), The Storefront Theatre (a non-profit off-Broadway company), board member of the National Conservatory of Dramatic Arts in Washington, DC, a board-certified member of the Association of Theatrical Press Agents and Managers, and a member of the Off-Broadway League of Theatres and Producers.

== Broadway, Off-Broadway, and US tour credits ==
Rice has received credits for the following Broadway, Off-Broadway, and US national tours as a manager or producer:

- Little Shop of Horrors
- Brooklyn: The Musical
- Flower Drum Song
- Urban Cowboy
- Chicago
- The Lion King
- The Crucible
- Long Day's Journey Into Night
- Glengarry Glen Ross
- Elaine Stritch: At Liberty
- One Flew Over The Cuckoo's Nest
- Harlem Song
- Footloose
- Titanic
- Wrong Mountain
- The Music Man
- Stomp
- Three Mo' Tenors
- Dudu Fisher: Something Old, Something New
- Dublin Carol
- Rags
- Egyptian RatScrew
- Gentlemen's Bet
- Dead Divas
- Rosencrantz and Guildenstern
- Valerie Shoots Andy
- Edge
- It's An Art: The Music Of Steven Schwartz

== Theatre on the Hill credits (manager/producer) ==
- The Dining Room
- My Fair Lady
- Blood Brothers
- The Sound of Music
- Noises Off
- Sleuth
- A Christmas Carol
- Winnie The Pooh
- Rumplestiltskin
- Aladdin
- Peter Pan
- The House of Blue Leaves
- Gypsy
