= Grant Hill (disambiguation) =

Grant Hill (born 1972) is an American former basketball player and co-owner and executive of the Atlanta Hawks.

Grant Hill may also refer to:

- Grant Hill (politician) (born 1943), Canadian politician
- Grant Hill (producer) (active 1994 and after), Australian film producer
- Grant Hill (New York), an elevation in Oneida County, New York
- Grant Hill, San Diego, an urban neighborhood in central San Diego, California

== See also ==
- Grants Hill Lake, a lake in Nova Scotia, Canada
- Hill (surname)
- All pages with titles containing "Grant Hill"
