= Grant Sheppard =

English cricketer

Grant Sheppard (born 6 December 1972) was an English cricketer. He was a left-handed batsman and right-arm medium-fast bowler who played for Wiltshire. He was born in Bradford-on-Avon, Wiltshire.

Sheppard, who played two matches for Durham Second XI during the 1992 season, played Minor Counties Championship cricket for Wiltshire between 1990 and 1994.

Sheppard made a single List A appearance for the side, during the 1993 NatWest Trophy season, against Durham. From the tail end, he scored two not out.

Sheppard bowled four overs in the match, conceding 41 runs.
