= Grant Morgan =

Grant Morgan may refer to:

- Grant Morgan (activist), New Zealand activist
- Grant Morgan (American football) (born 1998), American football player
- Grant Morgan (cricketer) (born 1971), South African cricketer
