= Dr. Gindi =

German contemporary sculptor (born 1965)

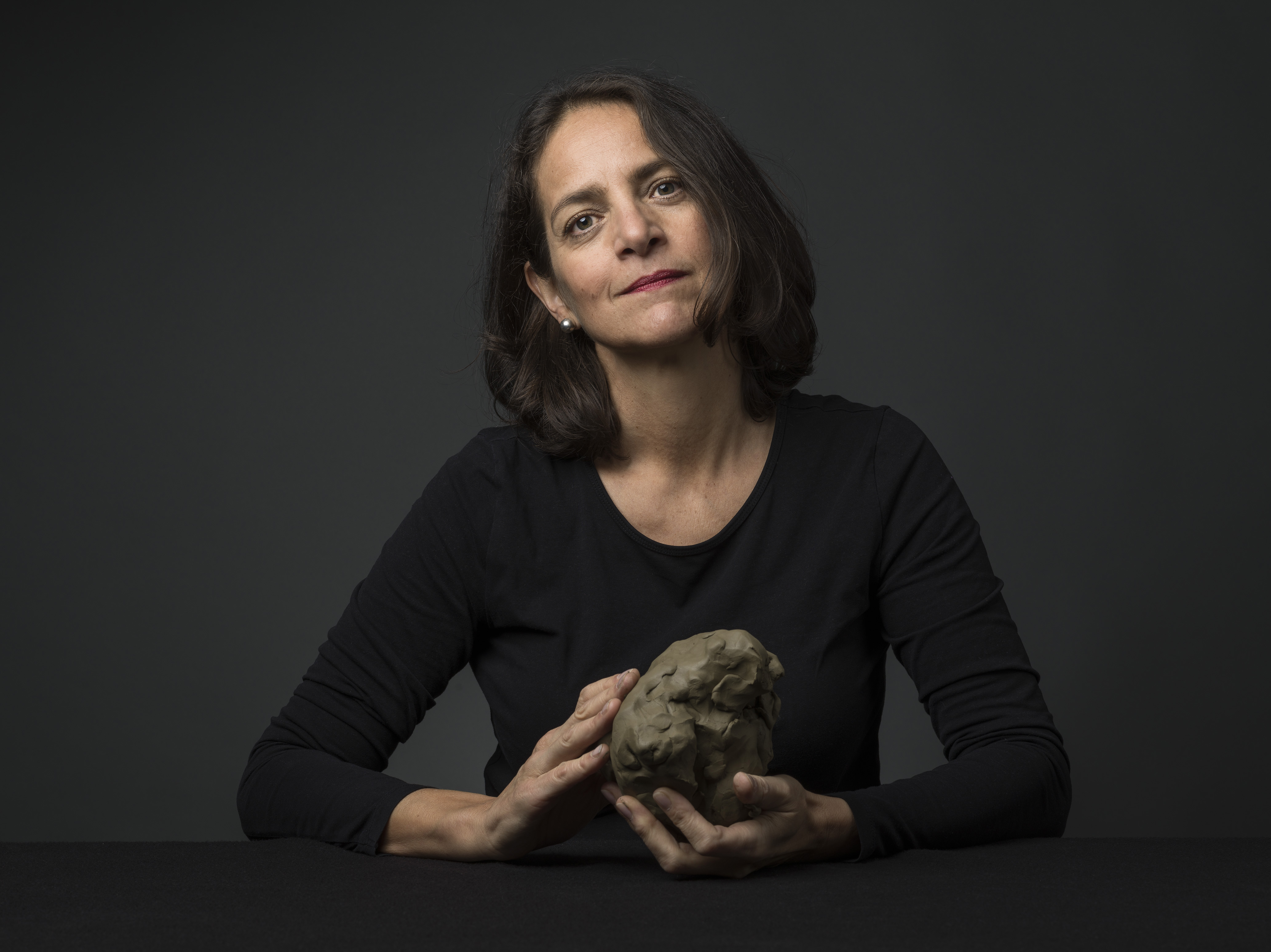
- Born: 1965 (age 60–61); Hanover, West Germany
- Education: Free University of Berlin, Florence Academy of Art
- Known for: Sculptor
- Movement: Contemporary art
- Website: www.dr-gindi.com

Dr. Gindi (born 1965) is a German contemporary sculptor. Her work focuses on the infinity of human existence. Dr. Gindi lives and works in Switzerland.

== Education ==
After studying medicine in Budapest and Berlin she obtained her doctoral degree from the Free University of Berlin. She worked as a medical doctor in various countries. She later turned to sculpture and studied at the Florence Academy of Art.

== Artistic career ==
Dr. Gindi's Egyptian heritage has been often reflected in some of her early works like "Transfigured Immortality". Over the course of her career, Dr. Gindi's creative process has evolved from her individual experiences to broader questions of the human condition.

Dr. Gindi has had several exhibitions globally, including shows in Switzerland, Italy, Spain, Germany, France, United States and China. She is a member of the US National Sculpture Society and the Portrait Society of America. Gindi was selected for the 2021 Figurativas Painting and Sculpture Competition of the European Museum of Modern Art in Barcelona and the National Sculpture Society's 2022 Annual Awards Exhibition at Brookgreen Gardens in South Carolina.

=== Style and technique ===
Dr. Gindi works with clay, bronze and other materials. She believes that humans in general and leaders in particular are like sculptors who give life to an otherwise inert clump of clay. Her work has varied in form and style, and has used intuition coupled with a discursive logic as a method of producing the final works.

==== Subject matter ====
A key recurring theme in Dr. Gindi's art is infinity and its intersectional layers. For Dr. Gindi, infinity is a metaphor for having the courage to seize the unprecedented and to allow it to unfold into life. As physician-turned sculptor, she is interested in exploring the inevitable decay of body and mind. Her works offer potential interpretations of the essence of life whilst illustrating the possibilities to embracing death.

===== Theoretical roots =====
The work of Dr. Gindi is inspired by philosophical enquiry. She uses the medium of sculpture to express her concerns about the human condition to depict its current and enduring challenges.

Dr. Gindi perceives herself closely bound to the tradition of Heraclitus' philosophy of change and Eastern philosophy: human beings are in a state of flux, without linear causalities. Similar to Existentialism, she favors ethical projects that accept human limitations and recognize the future as open. In aesthetics, she follows Immanuel Kant's perception of the sublime that is found in infinite presence.

====== Commentary ======
Dr Gindi is a frequent commentator on art. She currently contributes a monthly column to Art Vista Magazine.

=== Recent major exhibitions ===
- 2022: Galerie Simone Menne, Kiel, Germany
- 2022: National Sculpture Society's Annual Awards Exhibition at Brookgreen Gardens, USA
- 2022: Momok, Momok Kreuzlingen, Switzerland
- 2022: Villa Doria D'Angri - Parthenope University, Naples, Italy
- 2022: Gallery Höchhuus Küsnacht, Zürich, Switzerland
- 2022: Basile Contemporary Gallery, Rome, Italy
- 2022: d:gallery during documenta 15, Kassel, Germany
- 2022: Art Flow Zwolle, Zwolle, The Netherlands
- 2022: Hotel Ca' di Dio during Biennale, Venice, Italy
- 2022: Galeria Guntrian, Barcelona, Spain
- 2022: Royal Artistic Circle, Barcelona, Spain
- 2021: Kulturschiene, Zürich, Switzerland
- 2021: European Museum of Modern Art, Barcelona, Spain
- 2021: Basel Art Center, Basel, Switzerland
- 2022: Mémoire de l'Avenir, Paris, France

== See also ==
- Contemporary Art
- Neo-figurative art
- Sculpture
- National Sculpture Society
- Infinity
