= Grant Smith =

Grant Smith may refer to:

- Grant Smith (footballer, born 1980), Scottish footballer
- Grant Smith (footballer, born 1993), English footballer
- Ellis Grant Smith, Canadian musician of the R&B band Grant Smith & The Power
- R. Grant Smith (born 1939), American diplomat
- Grant Smith (field hockey) (born 1971), Australian field hockey player
- Grant Maloy Smith (born 1957), American singer, songwriter, musician, and businessman
- Grant Smith (politician), mayor of Palmerston North, New Zealand
