= Grant Williams (racing driver) =

Welsh racing driver

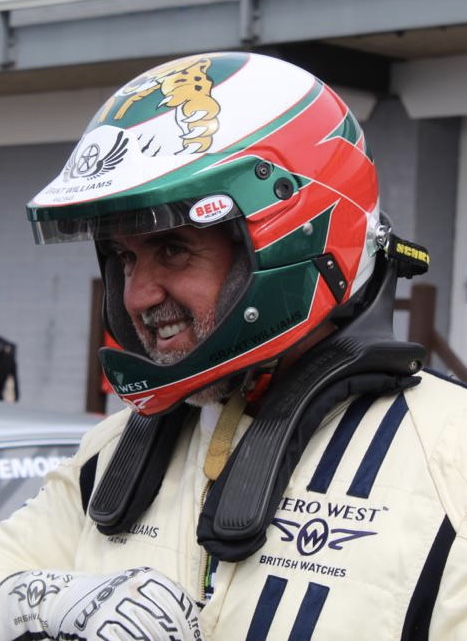
- Williams at Donington Park, 2023
- Born: Grant Williams; 1975 (age 50–51)
- Other names: "Welsh Wizard"; "Sultan of Slide"
- Citizenship: Welsh
- Known for: Historic motor racing driver
- Website: https://grantwilliamsracing.co.uk https://www.gttyrecentre.co.uk

Grant Williams (born 1975) is a Welsh racing driver.

== Personal life ==
Grant Williams was born in 1975 to a family of racing drivers and exponents of Jaguar cars in particular; Williams' father and grandfather had competed successfully driving Jaguar Mk1s and Mk2s at a club-level. In 1978, Williams and his family emigrated to Canada where his father continued to compete in motor racing. Following the family's return to Wales, Williams began his own motor racing career.

Outside of his racing career, Williams owns a tyre and maintenance garage near his home in Risca, South Wales. Williams met his current wife (who is also from a motor racing background) at the 2017 Goodwood Revival, prosposing to her two years later at the same event. Williams has two children.

== Career ==
=== Background ===
Williams' family began racing Jaguars in the 1950s; his grandfather, Gordon Williams, opened a maintenance garage in Risca, South Wales, which funded his later racing endeavours. In January 1962, Gordon Williams bought one of four experimental-prototype Jaguar Mk1 GTs directly from the Jaguar factory; the car had competed successfully in the 1959 British Saloon Car Championship when it was campaigned by Roy Salvadori for John Coombs under Coombs' famous registration 'BUY 1' (originally registered '287 JPK'). Having campaigned 'BUY 1' at a club-level for several years, (Note: Driving 'BUY 1' at Silverstone in 1962, Gordon Williams set the lap record for touring cars with engine capacities between 2600-3500cc at 1:18.2 with an average speed of 74mph.) ill-health forced Gordon Williams to retire from motor racing in 1972. Following Gordon Williams' death in 1984, Williams' family returned from Canada, and 'BUY 1' passed to Williams' father, Tony Williams. Tony Williams was already having racing success with his own Jaguar Mk2 and immediately put 'BUY 1' into long-term storage. Tony Williams did not use the car until he was persuaded to recommission it ready to compete at the first Goodwood Revival in 1998, when he finished fourth in the St. Mary's Trophy.

=== Early career ===
Williams began his career driving a Jaguar Mk2 (registered '8488 NK') in the 1995 Jaguar XK Saloon Car Championship. That year, Williams won the championship, becoming the youngest driver to do so, and firmly establishing his reputation as a club-level driver.

After his father competed in the 1998 Goodwood Revival, he convinced Williams to take the reins of 'BUY 1' for the following year. In 1999, the family entered ‘BUY 1’ into the St. Mary's trophy once again, but this time with Williams at the helm. He qualified on pole position, but was demoted to starting in fifteenth place due to a technical infringement. The torrential wet-weather played into Williams' hands, and by the end of the first lap, he had climbed to first position, surpassing the likes of Gerry Marshall. Williams' over-exuberance resulted in him spinning the car twice and finishing near the back of the grid. Commenting on the race in retrospect, Williams said "I learned from that. It was over-enthusiasm and I know now that I could have eased off a little and still have been pulling away". Nevertheless, Williams gained recognition for his enthusiastic driving style and car-control. (Note: In 2004, following Williams’ second-place finish in the St. Mary’s Trophy at that year’s Goodwood Revival, the Duke of Richmond (founder of the event, then styled Lord March) remarked that Williams’ driving was “some of the hardest [Goodwood] had ever seen.”)

=== Later career ===
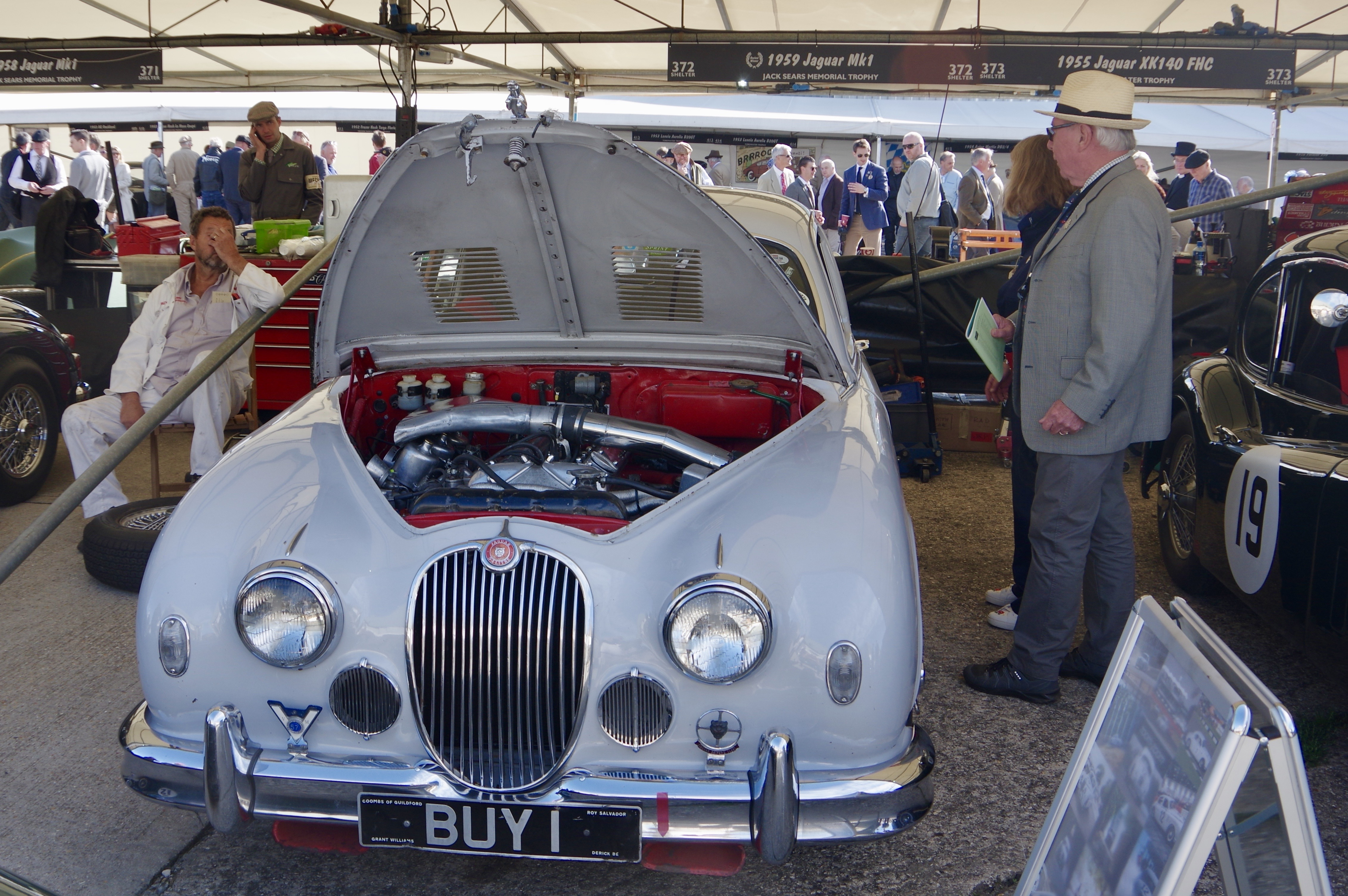
Williams' Jaguar Mk1 'BUY 1' at the 2018 Goodwood Revival.

From then on, Williams took over from his father, driving 'BUY 1' to third place in the St. Mary's Trophy at the following year's Goodwood Revival. In 2001, the St. Mary's Trophy changed from a one-driver race to a two-driver race; Williams was paired with Le Mans 24 hours winner, Derek Bell. Competing in this format, Williams and Bell won the St. Mary's Trophy at the 2002 Goodwood Revival, Bell's first win since the closure of the Goodwood Motor Circuit in 1966.

Later, the St. Mary's Trophy was split into two races with the final result decided on aggregate: part one for celebrity drivers and part two for the owners. During this iteration, Williams and Bell won the race on aggregate in 2006 and 2010, with Williams winning the second part of the race on two more occasions: namely at the 2012 and 2019 Goodwood Revivals. (Note: Williams was later disqualified from the 2019 St. Mary's Trophy for a technical infringement. While his Jaguar Mk1 'BUY 1' was originally built with triple-carburettors, they did not comply with Goodwood's regulations.) Williams has achieved over ten podium finishes at the Goodwood Revival driving 'BUY 1'. In 2018, Williams' exuberant driving style earned him a place in Autosport's "Goodwood Revival's Greatest Hits".

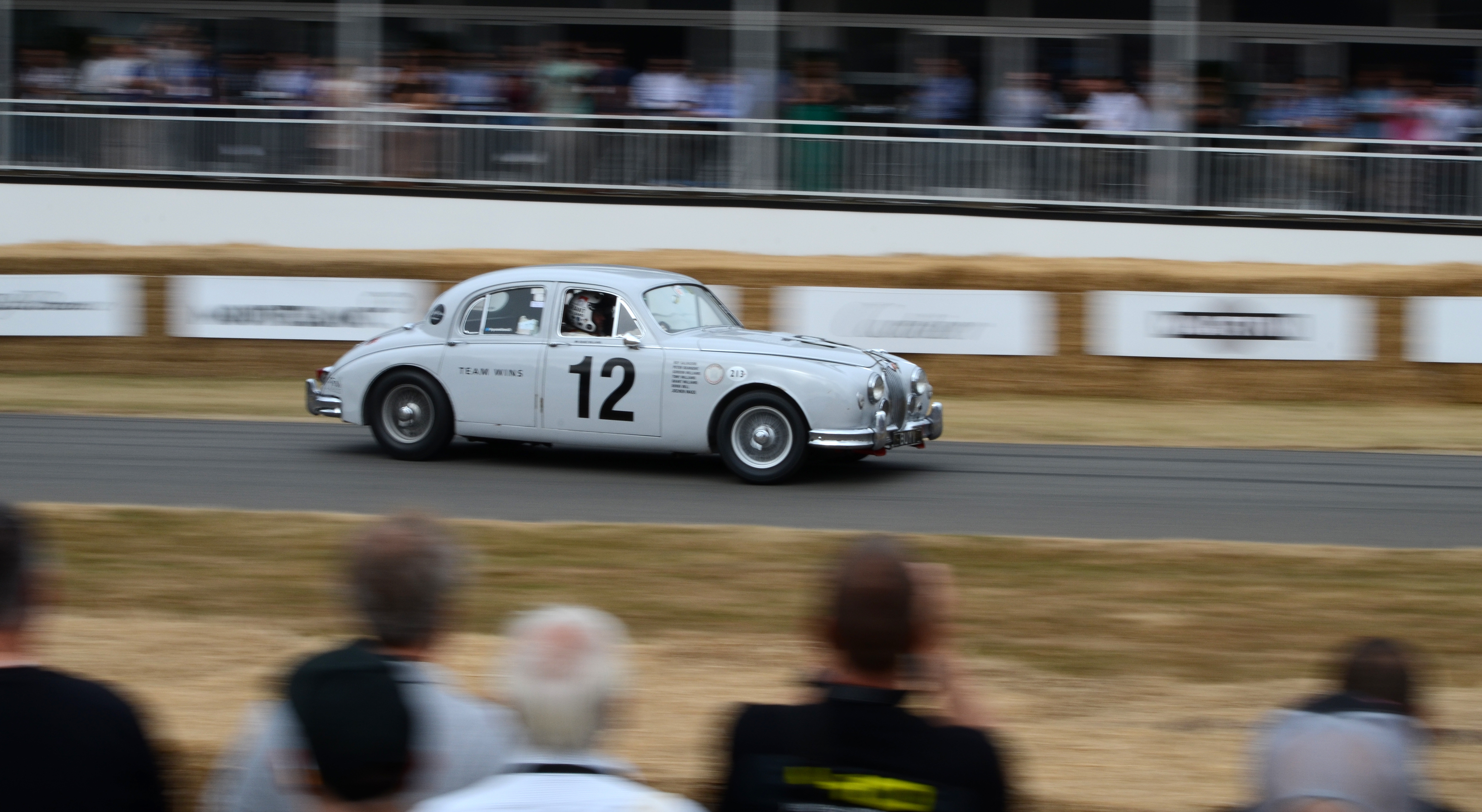
Williams on the hillclimb course, driving 'BUY 1' at the 2018 Goodwood Festival of Speed.

The same year, Williams made his Goodwood Festival of Speed debut, competing with 'BUY 1'. Williams gained press coverage for his frequent burnouts throughout the hill-climb course and unconventional driving-style given the age and value of the car.

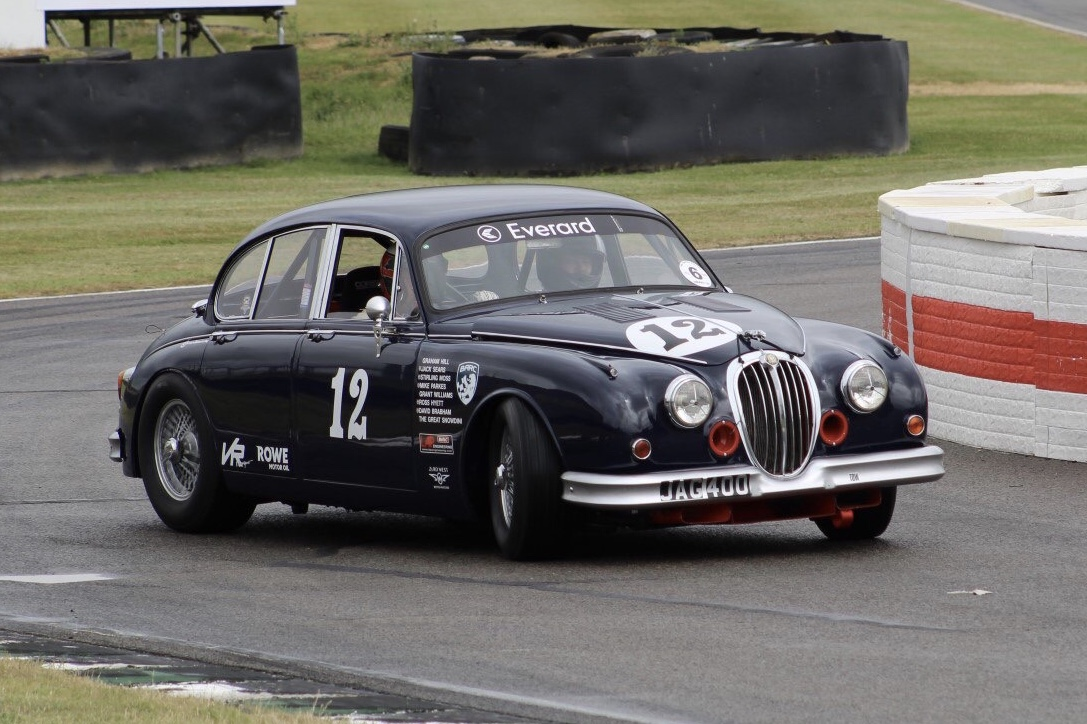
Williams exhibiting his side-ways driving style in his Jaguar Mk2 'JAG 400' at the Goodwood Motor Circuit, 2024.

In 2020, Williams restored a Jaguar Mk2 with the intention of racing at the Goodwood Revival on a yearly basis. (Note: In 2004, the St. Mary’s Trophy was split into separate races for 1950s and 1960s saloon cars, alternating each year. Williams’ Mk2 was built in 1961, ensuring year-on-year eligibility, as his Mk1 was built in 1959.) The car was originally campaigned in the British Saloon Car Championships of the early 1960s by the likes of Jack Sears, Mike Parkes, and Stirling Moss under Tommy Sopwith of Equipe Endeavour, sporting the registration plate 'JAG 400'. Williams’ family had taken ownership of the car in the 1970s when it required significant restoration work; the roof had collapsed after the car rolled during a race. Williams competed with 'JAG 400' in the St. Mary's Trophy at the 2020 Goodwood Speedweek and the 2022 Goodwood Revival, partnering with Le Mans 24 hours winner, David Brabham in the latter. In 2021, Williams drove 'JAG 400' at the Goodwood Festival of Speed.

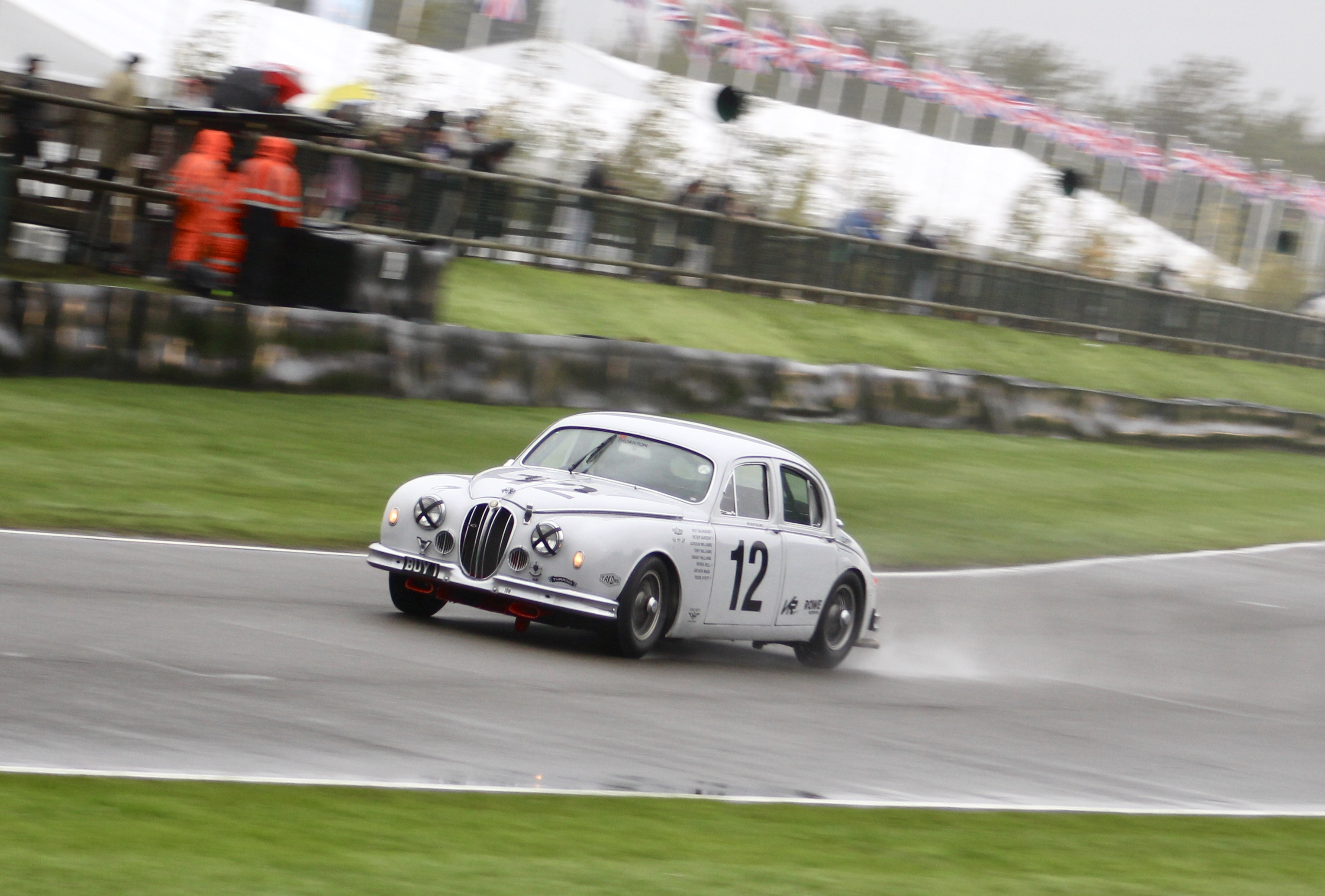
Williams on his return to Goodwood, driving 'BUY 1' from ninth to third in the St. Mary's Trophy at the 2025 Goodwood Revival.

While driving 'BUY 1' at the 2023 Goodwood Festival of Speed, one of the half-shafts on the rear axle failed, sending the still-spinning rear wheel it was attached to into the crowd of spectators. While the wheel hit two people, "no serious injuries" were incurred. Consequently, Williams did not compete at the Goodwood Revival later that year. While not present in any official capacity, Williams and his family did voluntarily supply and help install a spare engine for William Heynes and his Jaguar Mk1. (Note: William Heynes is a grandson of William 'Bill' Heynes, chief engineer for Jaguar between 1935-1969.) Heynes said of Williams and his family, "The support was just absolutely immense, and they asked for nothing in return. They showed a level of kindness I’ve never experienced. Our first Goodwood would have failed without their help." Williams returned to the Goodwood Revival with 'BUY 1' and 'JAG 400' in 2024, albeit only partaking in parade laps commemorating 75 years of the Jaguar XK engine. Following a two-year hiatus from competing at Goodwood, Williams returned to the Revival in 2025 driving 'BUY 1' once again in the St. Mary's Trophy, partnering with Le Mans 24 hours winner, Neel Jani.

=== Other endeavours ===
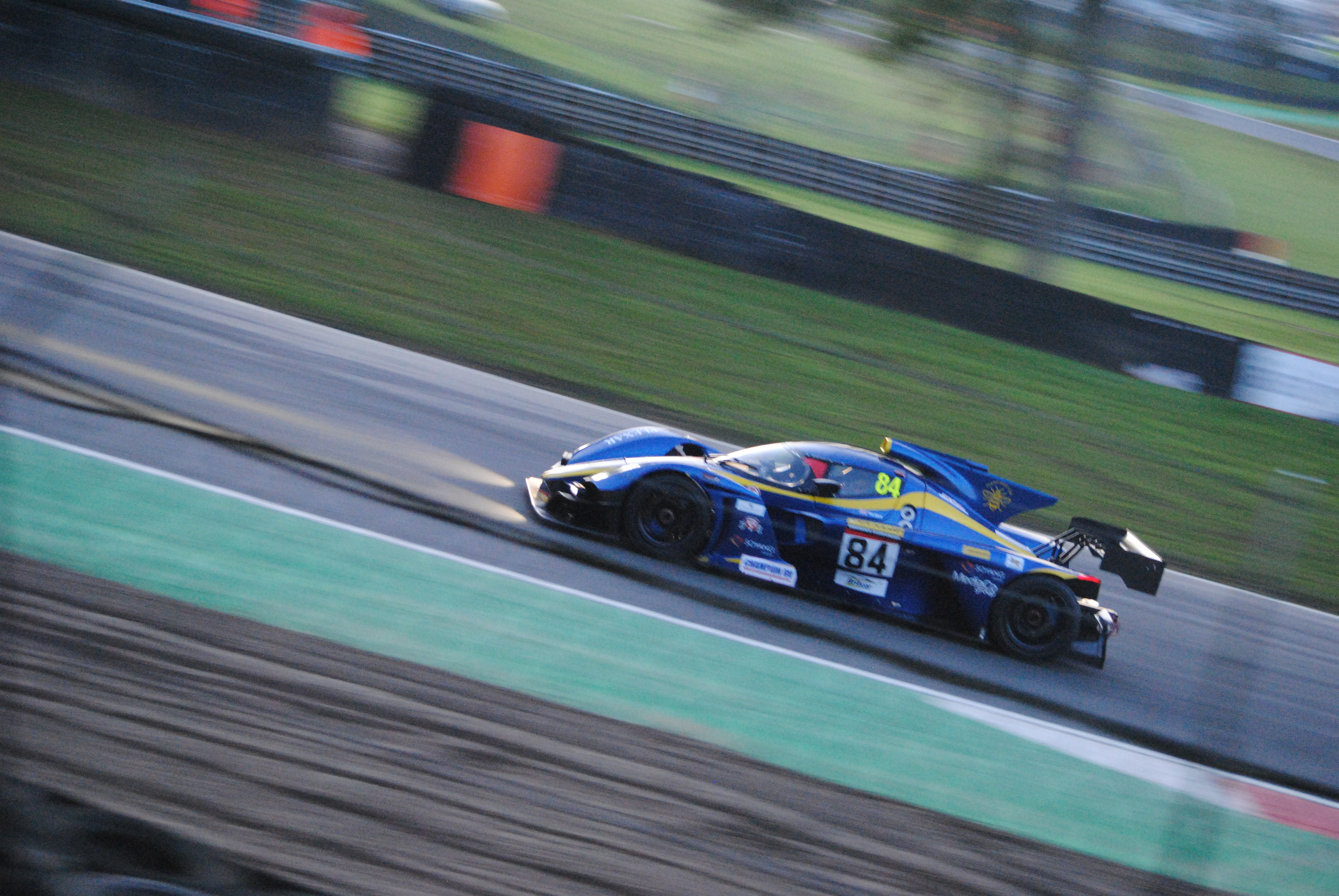
The Praga R1T Williams shared with Alastair Boulton and Tim Gray, in this case, driven by the latter.

In 2008, Williams competed in the Fast Forward Championship, driving a Ford Sierra Cosworth RS500. Despite starting every race in pole-position, consistent gearbox problems meant he finished no races in the championship.

Since 2017, Williams has attended CarFest with both his Jaguar Mk1 and Mk2.

In 2019, Williams competed in the Britcar Endurance Championship, driving a Praga R1T alongside Tim Gray and Alastair Boulton, winning their respective class in the championship.

In 2021, Williams competed in the seventh round of the Trophy Class in the Britcar Endurance Championship at Donington Park, co-driving a Renault Clio with Richard Colburn.

In January 2023, Scalextric began to offer a 1:32 scale model of Williams' Jaguar Mk1 'BUY 1'. In December of the same year, Hot Wheels began to offer a 1:62 scale model of the same car. In January 2024, Scalextric began to offer a 1:32 scale model of Williams' Jaguar Mk2 'JAG 400'.
