= Grant Krieger =

Canadian activist

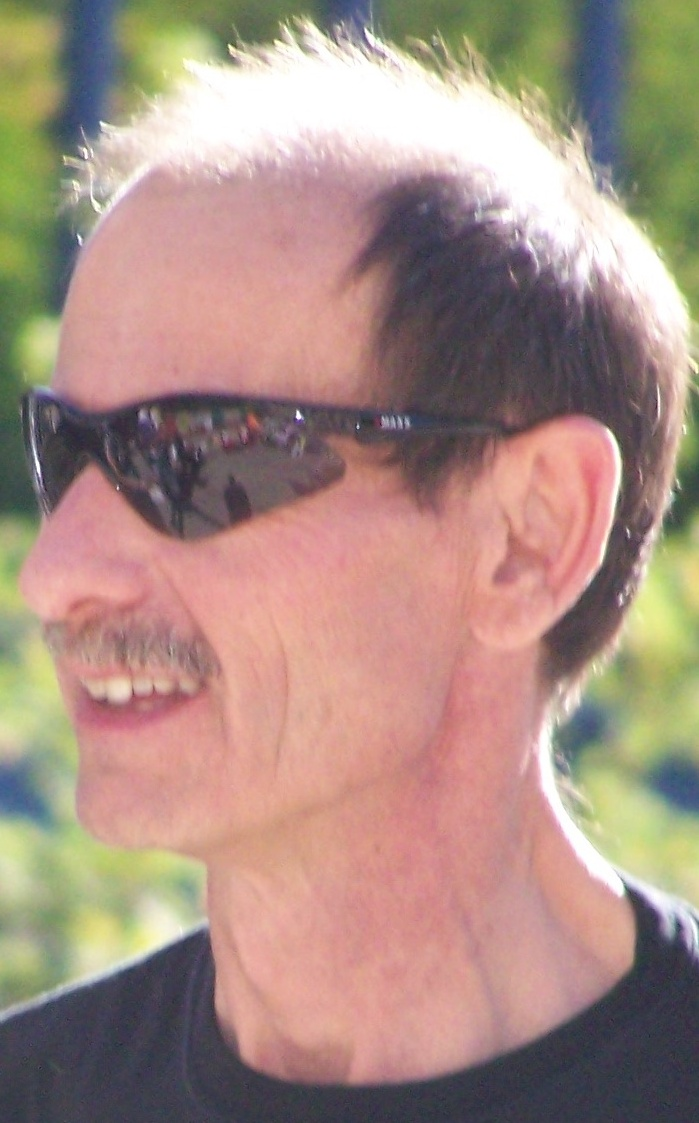
Grant Krieger, September 2007

Grant Wayne Krieger is a Canadian who, in May 1996, travelled to Holland to obtain a prescription for cannabis to alleviate symptoms of multiple sclerosis. He became a prominent cannabis rights advocate. In 1996 he began a controversy associated with medical marijuana. Krieger openly admitted to using and selling marijuana from his home in Regina because of his multiple sclerosis and his customers’ medical conditions.

In 1998 he moved his family to Calgary and was seen on the steps of the Calgary courthouse giving a fellow medicinal user an ounce of weed. He was charged with trafficking, and court appearances were scheduled. Krieger was elated with a not-guilty verdict.

In 2000, he won a judicial ruling allowing him to use marijuana for personal medical purposes.

In June 2001 he was acquitted on charges of possessing and trafficking marijuana.

In December 2003 he was convicted of trafficking marijuana. But in October 2006, this conviction was overturned by the Supreme Court, which found that the trial judge erred in compelling the jury to convict Krieger.

On March 27, 2007, Krieger was sentenced to four months in jail for trafficking marijuana. The judge also ordered that Krieger be provided marijuana for medical purposes while in jail. Because the Correctional Service of Canada indicated that it would not allow him to use marijuana, the judge deferred the sentence to June 2007 to give the agency time to accommodate Krieger’s use of marijuana.

In March 2009, Krieger was placed on probation for 18 months by the Court of Appeal of Alberta. In December 2009, the Court of Queen's Bench of Manitoba imposed a term of probation of nine months.
