= Grant Robinson =

Grant Robinson may refer to:

- Grant Robinson (cricketer) (born 1979), New Zealand cricketer
- Grant Robinson (soccer) (born 1998), American soccer player

== See also ==
- Grant Robertson (born 1971), New Zealand politician
