= Grant Munro =

Grant Munro may refer to:

- Grant Munro (footballer) (born 1980), Scottish professional footballer
- Grant Munro (filmmaker) (1923–2017), Canadian filmmaker
- Grant Munro (ice hockey) (1936-2019), Canadian defenseman
- Grant Munro, a character in the Sherlock Holmes story "The Adventure of the Yellow Face"
