= Grant Wilkinson =

British gunsmith

- Born: 1974 (age 51–52)
- Criminal charges: Conversion of imitation firearms, sale of illegal firearms
- Penalty: Life imprisonment

Grant Wilkinson (born 1974) is a self-taught British gunsmith convicted of illegally converting replica firearms to fire live ammunition. On August 28, 2008, Wilkinson was sentenced to life imprisonment, with the minimum eligibility for parole set for 11 years time.

== Criminal record ==
Wilkinson was an habitual criminal, in trouble with the police at age 13 over a theft and first convicted of an offence in 1995. In 1996 he received a four-year sentence for grievous bodily harm. In 2002 he received a three-year sentence for the possession of drugs for supply. But by 2004 he was free, and he proceeded to purchase 90 blank-firing replica MAC-10s under an assumed name, claiming they were to be used as props in a James Bond film. Although attributed with many crimes, two experts assessed Wilkinson and found his level of intelligence to be well below average. He was also shown to be unable to read any of the manuals needed to manufacture to guns.

== Firearms manufacture ==
The blank-firers were converted to fire live ammunition in a derelict outbuilding fitted out with computer controlled machine tools. The converted replicas were sold to criminals who employed them in at least 50 shootings including nine cases where victims were killed. This included high-profile cases such as the murder of police officer Sharon Beshenivsky, that of Nigerian teenager Michael Dosunmu and Richard Holmes (by rapper Carl Dobson).

Police reportedly determined in 2005 – from ballistic tests conducted on recovered bullets – that a number of shootings were connected to a number of firearms from a single batch. They visited gun dealer Guy Savage, who had sold the replica firearms, and obtained a photo he had secretly taken of Wilkinson. However, Wilkinson would not be apprehended until neighbors discovered his conversion operation and informed the police.

11 of the firearms were discovered at the site and in a field in Buckinghamshire. 39 others have been recovered from locations in London, Southampton, Birmingham, and the West Country. At the time of Wilkinson's conviction in 2008, this left 40, presumably converted, MAC-10's in the hands of criminals. At least two more have since been recovered, with the police offering rewards of up to £10,000 for information leading to the recovery of one of the firearms.
