= Grant Mitchell =

Grant Mitchell may refer to:

- Grant Mitchell (actor) (1874–1957), American stage and film actor
- Grant Mitchell (politician) (born 1951), Canadian politician and businessman
- Grant Mitchell (EastEnders), a fictional character from the British soap opera EastEnders
- Grant Mitchell (Home and Away), a fictional character from the Australian soap opera Home and Away
