= Stennett (surname) =

Stennett is a surname. Notable people with the name include:

- Adam Stennett (born 1972), American painter
- Clint Stennett (1956–2010), American politician
- Joseph Stennett (1663–1713), English Seventh Day Baptist minister and hymnwriter (grandfather of Samuel Stennett)
- Michelle Stennett (born 1960), American politician
- Rennie Stennett (1949–2021), Panamanian baseball player
- Samuel Stennett (1727–1795), English Seventh Day Baptist minister and hymnwriter (grandson of Joseph Stennett)
- Stan Stennett (1925–2013), Welsh comedian, actor and jazz musician

== See also ==
- Stinnett (disambiguation) § People with the surname
