= Grant Martin Overton =

American writer and critic (1887–1930)

Grant Martin Overton (September 19, 1887 – July 4, 1930) was an American writer and critic.

Grant Martin Overton was born in Patchogue, New York, to Ardelia Jarvis (Skidmore) and Floyd Alward Overton. He attended Princeton University from 1904 to 1906. He was a fiction editor at Collier's from 1924 to 1930. Overton died in Patchogue.

== Publications ==
- The Women Who Make Our Novels (1918)
- Mermaid (1920)
- The Answerer (1921)
- World Without End (1921)
- Island of the Innocent (1923)
- The Thousand and First Night (1924)
