= Grant McDonald =

Grant McDonald may refer to:

- Grant McDonald (baseball)
- Grant McDonald (Canadian football)

== See also ==
- Grant Macdonald, a silversmith and goldsmith company
- Grant MacDonald, outsider musician
