= Grant Trindall =

Australian rugby league footballer

Personal information
- Full name: Grant Trindall

Playing information
- Position: Lock
Club
Years	Team	Pld	T	G	FG	P
1993	Penrith Panthers	1	0	0	0	0
1995	Western Suburbs	1	0	0	0	0
	Total	2	0	0	0	0
- Source: As of 29 December 2022

Grant Trindall is an Australian former professional rugby league footballer who played in the 1990s. He played for Penrith and Western Suburbs in the NSWRL/ARL competition.

== Playing career ==
Trindall made his first grade debut for Penrith in round 9 of the 1993 NSWRL season against Western Suburbs at Campbelltown Sports Stadium. Trindall played at lock in Penrith's 24-10 loss. In 1995, Trindall joined Western Suburbs and played one game for the club, a 46-12 loss against the Auckland Warriors in round 3 of the competition at Mount Smart Stadium.
