= Grant Jackson =

Grant Jackson may refer to:

- Grant Jackson (baseball) (1942–2021), American baseball player and pitching coach
- Grant Jackson (attorney) (1869–1949), American attorney and judge in California
- Grant Jackson (politician), Canadian politician from Manitoba
