= Grant Palmer =

Grant Palmer may refer to:

- Grant H. Palmer (1940–2017), American educator
- Grant Palmer (bus operator), a British company
- Grant Palmer (racing driver) (born 2001), American racing driver
