= Grant Doyle =

Grant Doyle may refer to:

- Grant Doyle (baritone), Australian/British operatic baritone
- Grant Doyle (tennis) (born 1974), Australian former tennis player and coach
