= Grant Jordan =

Australian cricketer (born 1965)

Personal information
- Born: 18 March 1965 (age 61); Melbourne, Australia

Domestic team information
- Years: Team
- 1985-1987: Victoria
- Source: Cricinfo, 9 December 2015

Grant Jordan (born 18 March 1965) is an Australian former cricketer. He played three first-class cricket matches for Victoria between 1985 and 1987.

== See also ==
- List of Victoria first-class cricketers
