= Grant J. Hagiya =

Grant J. Hagiya is a bishop in the United Methodist Church, having been elected to that position in 2008.

== Family ==
Bishop Hagiya was born 3 January 1952 in Chicago, Illinois and is a third-generation Japanese American (Sansei). He is married to Janet, a high school librarian, and has 3 children, Alexis (Education Coordinator at the University of Southern California), Jamie (A professional basketball player), and Trent (Finishing his undergraduate degree).

He loves all sports and holds a Sandan (3rd Degree Black Belt) in Kenpo Karate, having studied since he was in Jr. High School.

== Education ==
Bishop Hagiya received his B.A. in Psychology from San Jose State University in 1974. He received a Master of Arts in Religion from the Claremont School of Theology in 1976, and a Master of Religion and Doctor of Ministry degrees from Claremont in 1977. He attended the Graduate Theological Union from 1978, and finished his coursework for the Ph.D. in theological ethics, but had to take a leave of absence before the dissertation in order to fulfill his role as the Chairperson of the National Japanese American Caucus. He received his Ed.D. degree in Organizational Leadership from Pepperdine University. His dissertation was on the traits, qualities and characteristics of highly effective UMC clergy. His field of interest is in leadership studies, organizational development through systems theory, and change management.

== Ordained ministry ==
Bishop Hagiya was ordained a United Methodist Deacon in 1976 and an Elder (Methodism) in 1980. He was appointed to three churches in his ministry career: Berkeley UMC in the California-Nevada Annual Conference, North Gardena UMC in the California-Pacific Annual Conference, and Centenary UMC also in the California-Pacific Annual Conference (see Annual Conferences of the United Methodist Church).

He served the Claremont School of Theology as assistant professor of Urban Ministries and Religion and Society, and field education director, and continued to serve as an adjunct professor throughout his career in the Cal-Pac Annual Conference. He served as the district superintendent of the Los Angeles District and dean of the Cabinet prior to being elected to the episcopacy. He was slated to create the Center of Leadership Excellence between the California-Pacific Annual Conference and the Claremont School of Theology right before his election as a bishop.

He was a delegate from the California-Pacific Annual Conference to General Conference (United Methodist Church) and Jurisdictional Conference three times, and served as head of the delegation one time.

He has served as chairperson of the Board of Ordained Ministry and numerous other church and community organizations.

He has served as a board member of the General Board of Higher Education and Ministry, the General Commission on Religion and Race, and the General Board of Global Ministries.

== Episcopal ministry ==
In 2016, Grant J. Hagiya became Resident Bishop of the California-Pacific Conference of the United Methodist Church, after having served as the Resident Bishop of the Greater Northwest Episcopal Area of the United Methodist Church, presiding over its Alaska, Pacific Northwest, and Oregon-Idaho Annual Conferences. Previously (2008–12) he served the Seattle Area, which included the Pacific Northwest and Alaska Conferences. That area was merged with the Portland area (Oregon-Idaho Conference) in 2012.

Hagiya also serves as the chairperson of one of the 4 Focus Areas of the denomination: "Developing Principled Christian Leaders."

In 2013, Hagiya's first book on church leadership titled Spiritual Kaizen: How to Become a Better Church Leader was published by Abingdon Press.

== See also ==
- Annual Conferences of the United Methodist Church
- List of bishops of the United Methodist Church
