= Grant Taylor =

Grant Taylor may refer to:

- Grant Taylor (actor) (1917–1971), English-born actor
- Grant Taylor (baseball) (born 2002), American baseball player
- Grant Taylor (skateboarder) (born 1991), American skateboarder
- Grant Taylor (sport shooter) (born 1950), New Zealand sports shooter
- Grant Austin Taylor (born 1995), American rock and blues guitarist
