= Grant Young =

Grant Young may refer to:

- Grant Young (musician) (born 1964), American drummer with Soul Asylum
- Grant Young (rugby league) (born 1970), New Zealand rugby league player
- Grant Young (soccer) (born 1971), South African soccer player
