= Grant Green (disambiguation) =

Grant Green (1935–1979) was an American jazz guitarist and composer.

Grant Green may also refer to:

- Grant Green (baseball) (born 1987), American baseball player
- Grant Green (Oklahoma politician)
- Grant Green Jr. (born 1955), American jazz guitarist
- Grant S. Green Jr. (born 1938), U.S. Under Secretary of State
