= Grant Campbell (musician) =

Grant Campbell is a Scottish singer-songwriter, born in Glasgow in 1979. He began playing in various bands when he was 16 and went on to pursue a solo career in his early twenties. He has so far released seven full-length albums as well as an EP.

== Career ==
He has supported many different acts including Odetta, Mary Gauthier, The Handsome Family, John Hammond, James Blood Ulmer, Michael Hurley, Diana Jones and Micah P Hinson amongst many others.

His debut album Postcards from Nowhere was recorded at home on a four track with Campbell recording and performing all the music. It was released in the summer of 2005 on a small local independent label, Crooked Mouth Records, to critical acclaim which included an "Album of the Week" in The Sunday Times. The album was likened to Springsteen's classic Nebraska album with its rustic feel and rough vocals.

His second album Beyond Below was released in November 2007 on Crooked Mouth Records.

In 2008, Campbell recorded a version of the old lullaby "All the Pretty Little Horses" for the film The Burrowers which was premiered at the Toronto International Film Festival.

Expecting Great Things, his third album was released on 6 April 2009. The majority of the album was recorded in one afternoon at home in Glasgow. As with the previous two albums Campbell wrote, recorded and performed all the tracks himself. On 4 October 2009, A Brief History of Things to Come, a sampler album which featured eight tracks taken from Campbell's first three albums was released in the Netherlands. This release coincides with a theater tour throughout the Netherlands.

Fixing the Shadows, Campbell's fourth album was released on 22 April 2013. It was recorded at Glo Worm Studios in Glasgow with Iain Hutchison. His fifth album The Spark was released in 2014.

A sixth album ‘I Was Taught How to Win, but I Learned How to Lose’ was released in 2020.

On 6th December 2024 ‘Apollo Wept’ was released which was written and recorded during the pandemic. It was followed a week later by the release of a four track EP ‘A Million Miles Away’.
