= Tripp Fuller =

American theologian, minister, and broadcaster

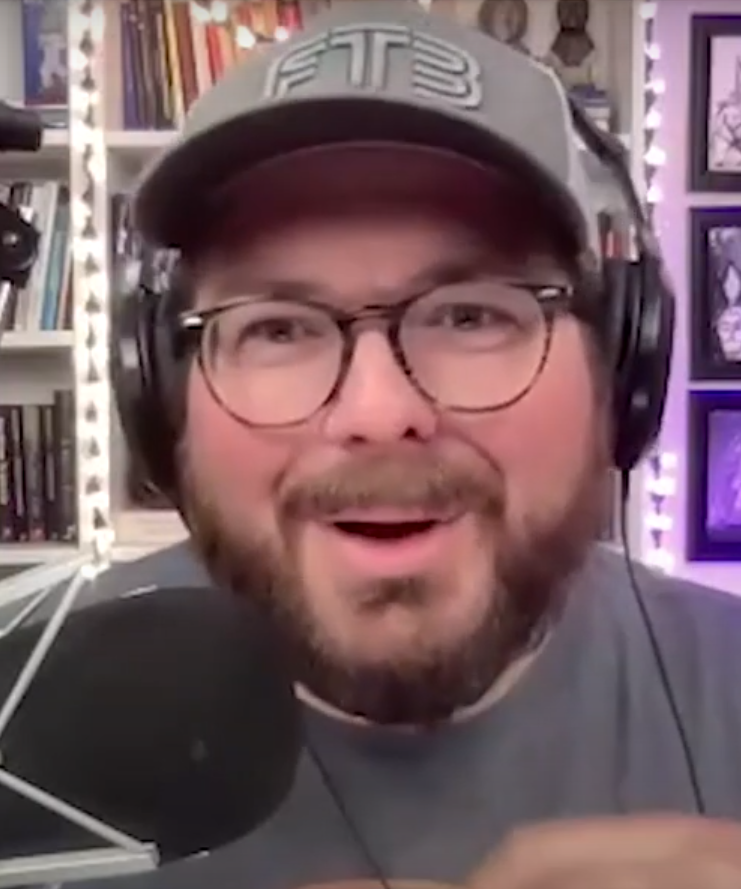
Fuller in 2024

Tripp Fuller is an American theologian, minister, and broadcaster. He is the founder and host of Homebrewed Christianity, one of the most downloaded theology programs in podcasting. He was formerly a Postdoctoral Research Fellow in Theology and Science at the University of Edinburgh, and he is currently a visiting professor at Luther Seminary.

== Biography ==
Born in North Carolina, Fuller earned his B.A. at Campbell University, his M. Div. at Wake Forest University, and his Ph.D. in Philosophy, Religion, and Theology at Claremont Graduate University.

== Homebrewed Christianity ==
Founded in March 2008, Homebrewed Christianity is among the most popular podcasts in theology. Episodes generally feature an extended interview with a theologian, philosopher, or scholar, and many prominent figures have appeared on the show. Notable guests include Rob Bell, Peter Rollins, Dan Koch, Richard Rohr, John D. Caputo, Walter Brueggemann, Elizabeth Johnson, Catherine Keller, and Diana Butler Bass.

== Book series ==
Fuller is the editor of the Homebrewed Christianity Guides. Published by Fortress Press, the guides offer an exploration of a theological topic in introductory and accessible language designed for a broad audience.

- 2015: The Homebrewed Christianity Guide to Jesus: Lord, Liar, Lunatic ... Or Awesome? Tripp Fuller.
- 2016: The Homebrewed Christianity Guide to the End Times: Theology after You've Been Left Behind. Jeffrey C. Pugh.
- 2016: The Homebrewed Christianity Guide to God: Everything You Ever Wanted To Know about the Almighty. Eric E. Hall.
- 2017: The Homebrewed Christianity Guide to Church History: Flaming Heretics and Heavy Drinkers. Bill Leonard.
- 2018: The Homebrewed Christianity Guide to Being Human: Becoming the Best Bag of Bones You Can Be. Donna Bowman.
- 2018: The Homebrewed Christianity Guide to the Holy Spirit: Hand-Raisers, Han, and the Holy Ghost. Grace Ji-Sun Kim.
- 2018: The Homebrewed Christianity Guide to the Old Testament: Israel's In-Your-Face, Holy God. Rolf A. Jacobson.

== Film ==
Fuller cowrote and costarred in the 2018 film The Road to Edmond. Produced independently, and directed by David Trotter, the film depicts the unlikely friendship between Cleo, a youth minister, and Larry, a mercurial figure Cleo encounters on the road. Through a series of conversations, the two offer a meditation on the role of Christianity in contemporary American life.

== Publications ==
- 2015: The Homebrewed Christianity Guide to Jesus: Lord, liar, lunatic ... or awesome? Minneapolis: Fortress Press.
- 2020: Divine Self-Investment. Grasmere, Idaho: SacraSage Press.
