= Grant Sonnex =

- Occupations: Radio presenter/ producer; Furniture maker

Grant Sonnex is a furniture designer and former BBC radio presenter.

== Background ==
Sonnex worked for 20 years as a wildlife radio producer with the BBC Natural History Unit, he also presented documentary programmes on BBC Radio 4, several of which are available in RealAudio format from the BBC website.

In 1998 he received a Glaxo Wellcome ABSW Science Writers' Award for best contribution to a radio programme on a science subject.

He left the BBC and retrained as a furniture designer, setting up a studio in Gloucestershire. In 2013 he moved to St Davids, Pembrokeshire and is now designing and hand-making furniture in his workshop. He makes tables and sideboards and, in January 2014, a table he had made unexpectedly appeared on an episode of the BBC's Sherlock.
