= Grant Schofield =

New Zealand footballer

Personal information
- Full name: Grant R Schofield
- Place of birth: New Zealand
- Position: Goalkeeper

Senior career*
Years	Team	Apps	(Gls)
1986–1988	Manurewa		

International career
1991–1996	New Zealand	2	(0)
- * Club domestic league appearances and goals

Grant Schofield is a former football (soccer) goalkeeper who represented New Zealand at international level.

Schofield played two official A-international matches for the New Zealand, making his debut in a 0–2 loss to England on 18 June 1991. His second official appearance didn't come until some five years later in a 2–3 loss to Qatar on 5 October 1996.
