= Grant Evans =

Grant Evans may refer to:

- Grant Evans (scholar)
- Grant Evans (footballer)
