= Grant Stevens =

Grant Stevens may refer to:

- Grant Stevens (musician) (born 1953), Australian singer, musician and composer based in Germany
- Grant Stevens (police officer), Australian senior police officer, future Governor of South Australia

== See also ==
- Steven Grant, American comic book writer
- Stephen Grant (disambiguation)
