= Grant Easterbrook =

American financial analyst

- Born: c. 1988 (age 37–38); Maryland, United States
- Education: Bowdoin College
- Known for: Commentating on the financial technology industry
- Father: Gregg Easterbrook
- Relatives: Judge Frank Easterbrook (uncle)

Grant Easterbrook is an American entrepreneur and fintech commentator based in Amsterdam. He has written articles around fintech and Artificial Intelligence (AI) topics to make them easier to understand for the general public. Over his career he has been cited in the media multiple times.

== Early life and education ==
Easterbrook is the son of author Gregg Easterbrook and the nephew of Judge Frank Easterbrook.

Easterbrook graduated from Winston Churchill High School in Potomac, Maryland in 2007. He graduated from Bowdoin College in Brunswick, Maine in 2011, where he was a member of the Bowdoin College football team.

== Career ==
In 2015 Easterbrook left his role as a fintech analyst to found a Newark-based startup for the retirement and 401(k) industry.

He has been cited on the topic of fintech in the media over 150 times, including in The Wall Street Journal, Reuters, The New York Times, Financial Times, San Francisco Chronicle, ThinkAdvisor VentureBeat, Fortune, Financial Planning, MarketWatch, Financial Advisor, Crain's New York Business, Huffington Post, MSN Money, PBS, Al Jazeera America, Main Street, U.S. News & World Report, Wealth Management and The Fiscal Times.
