= Grant R. Mulder =

United States Air Force general

Grant R. Mulder was a major general in the United States Air Force.

== Career ==
Mulder joined the Air Force in 1964. He served in the Vietnam War before being given the command of the 64th Tactical Airlift Squadron. Later he was assigned to the Office of the United States Secretary of the Air Force and served as mobilization assistant to the director for logistics of United States Atlantic Command. His retirement was effective as of June 1, 2001.

Awards he has received include the Meritorious Service Medal with oak leaf cluster, the Air Medal with three oak leaf clusters, the Air Force Commendation Medal, the Outstanding Unit Award, the Armed Forces Expeditionary Medal, the Vietnam Service Medal, and the Vietnam Gallantry Cross.

== Education ==
- B.S., Business – University of Wisconsin-Whitewater
- M.B.A. with honors – Roosevelt University
- Distinguished Graduate – National Defense University
