= Grant Turner =

Grant Turner' may refer to:

- Grant Turner (footballer) (1958–2023), New Zealand association footballer
- Grant Turner (radio host), hosted Grand Ole Opry radio program 1944-91
- Grant Turner (swimmer), British swimmer
