= Grant Oppy =

Australian rules footballer

Personal information
- Full name: Grant Maxwell Oppy
- Born: 4 December 1950 (age 75)
- Height: 178 cm (5 ft 10 in)
- Weight: 81 kg (179 lb)

Playing career^{1}
Years	Club	Games (Goals)
1970	Richmond	1 (0)
- ^{1} Playing statistics correct to the end of 1970.

Grant Maxwell Oppy (born 4 December 1950) is a former Australian rules footballer who played with Richmond in the Victorian Football League (VFL).
