= Grant Stinnett =

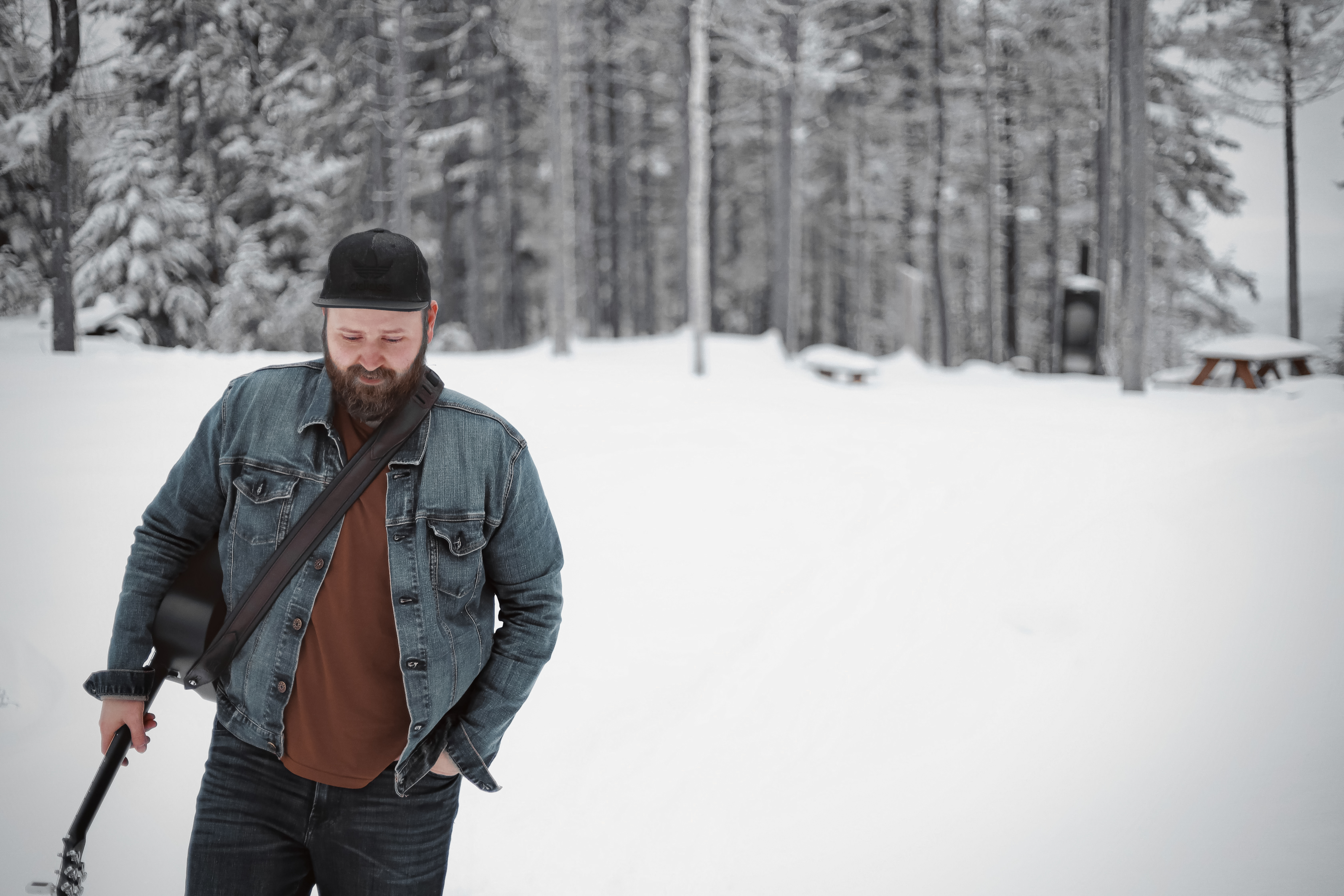

Background information
- Instrument: Bass guitar

Grant Stinnett is an American bassist notable for compositions on the bass guitar played as a solo instrument which use tunings different from the standard bass guitar tuning. For example, he performed using a D-Tuner bass tuned to C G C G for his tune Born of Fire and Light. He played the jazz standard All the things you are using a LeFay Singer six-string bass, with a special tuning from the low E to the high F instead of the usual B to C tuning. Reviewer Jake Kot in Bass Musician Magazine compared Stinnett to bass guitarists such as Michael Manring, Victor Wooten, and Steve Bailey, who play the bass guitar as a solo instrument, and Kot described Stinnett as presenting a "nice array of techno-adventures, ambient excursions, chord/melody playing", with good melodies. Stinnett's album G Money was released in 2006 when he was 17 years old.
