= Grant McEachran =

English footballer

Personal information
- Full name: Grant McEachran
- Date of birth: 1894
- Place of birth: Barrow-in-Furness, England
- Date of death: 1966 (aged 71–72)
- Position: Full-back

Senior career*
Years	Team	Apps	(Gls)
1918–1919	Barrow		
1919–1922	Grimsby Town	66	(0)
1922–1924	Doncaster Rovers	16	(0)
1924–1925	Halifax Town	1	(0)
- * Club domestic league appearances and goals

Grant McEachran (1894–1966) was an English professional footballer who played as a full-back.
