= Grant Horscroft =

English footballer

Personal information
- Full name: Grant Horscroft
- Date of birth: 30 July 1961
- Place of birth: Fletching, England
- Height: 6 ft 4 in (1.93 m)
- Position: Central defender

Senior career*
Years	Team	Apps	(Gls)
- Ringmer
19??–1987	Lewes		
- → Sutton United (loan)
1987–1988	Brighton & Hove Albion	2	(0)
1988–1993	Lewes		
1993–199?	Ringmer		
- * Club domestic league appearances and goals

Grant Horscroft (born 30 July 1961) is an English former professional footballer who played as a central defender in the Football League for Brighton & Hove Albion.

Horscroft was born in Fletching, East Sussex, in 1961. He played non-league football for Ringmer, Lewes and Sutton United, before joining Brighton & Hove Albion for a fee of £2,500, which remained, as of 2016, the Lewes club's record transfer fee received. He made two league appearances as Albion gained promotion as 1987–88 Third Division runners-up, before returning to non-league with Lewes, where he spent time as assistant manager and caretaker manager as well as player, and Ringmer.
