= Grant =

Grant or Grants may refer to:

== Law and philanthropy ==
- Grant (money), an award usually funded by a government, business, or foundation, often with not-for-profit preconditions
- Grant (law), a term in conveyancing
- Grant of arms in nobility
- Spanish and Mexican land grants in New Mexico
- Spanish land grants in Florida
- Grant v Torstar Corp, a leading Supreme Court of Canada case on responsible communication in the public interest as a defence against defamation

== People ==
- Grant (given name), including a list of people and fictional characters
- Grant (surname), including a list of people and fictional characters
  - Ulysses S. Grant (1822–1885), the 18th president of the United States and general of the Union during the American Civil War
- Clan Grant, a Highland Scottish clan

== Places ==
- Grant County (disambiguation)

=== Australia ===
- District Council of Grant, South Australia
- Grant, Queensland, a locality in the Barcaldine Region, Queensland, Australia

=== United Kingdom ===
- Castle Grant

=== United States ===
- Grant, Alabama
- Grant, Inyo County, California
- Grant, Colorado
- Grant-Valkaria, Florida
- Grant, Iowa
- Grant, Michigan
- Grant, Minnesota
- Grant, Missouri, original name for New Point, Missouri
- Grant, Nebraska
- Grant, Ohio, an unincorporated community
- Grant, Wisconsin (disambiguation) (six towns)
- Grant City, Indiana
- Grant City, Missouri
- Grant City, Staten Island
- Grant Lake (disambiguation), several lakes
- Grant Park, Illinois
- Grant Park (Chicago)
- Grant Town, West Virginia
- Grant Township (disambiguation) (100 townships in 12 states)
- Grant Village in Yellowstone National Park
- Grants, New Mexico
- Grants Pass, Oregon
- U.S. Grant Bridge over Ohio River and Scioto River
- General Grant National Memorial aka Grant's Tomb

=== India ===
- Jolly Grant Airport Dehradun, Uttarakhand

=== Canada ===
- Rural Municipality of Grant No. 372, Saskatchewan

== Art, entertainment, and media ==
- Grant (book), a 2017 biography of Ulysses S. Grant by Ron Chernow
- Grant (miniseries), a 2020 miniseries based on the Chernow book
- "Grant", a poem by Patti Smith from her 1978 book Babel

== Businesses ==
- Donald M. Grant, Publisher, Inc., a fantasy and science fiction small press publisher in New Hampshire
- W. T. Grant variety store, a chain of mass-merchandise stores
- William Grant & Sons, a Scotch whisky distilling company

== Vehicles and transportation ==
- Grant (automobile), a defunct Findlay, Ohio auto manufacturer
- M3 Lee, an American tank, a modified version was called the Grant
- USS Grant, several ships of the U.S. Navy

== Other uses ==
- Grant, colloquial term for a United States fifty-dollar bill which bears a portrait of President Ulysses S. Grant
- Cyclone Grant, a tropical cyclone that made landfall near Darwin, Australia, in late-December 2011
- Grant (folklore), a creature of English folklore

== See also ==
- General Grant (disambiguation)
- Justice Grant (disambiguation)
- President Grant (disambiguation)
- Grant Thornton (disambiguation)
