= Grant Lake =

Grant Lake may refer to:

- Grant Lake (Mono County, California)
- Grant Lake (Santa Clara County, California)
- Grant Lake (Douglas County, Minnesota)

Grant Lake Portsmouth

== See also ==
- Grant (disambiguation)
- Grand Lake (disambiguation)
