= Grand Lake =

Grand Lake may refer to:

== Lakes ==
Canada

- Grand Lake (Nova Scotia)
- Grand Lake (Newfoundland and Labrador)
- Grand Lake (New Brunswick)
- Grand Lake (Nipissing), Ontario
- Grand Lake (Timiskaming), Ontario

China

- Taihu, literally Grand Lake

United States

- Grand Lake, a lake in Chicot County, Arkansas
- Grand Lake (Colorado)
- Grand Lake (Louisiana)
- Grand Lake (Michigan) in Presque Isle County
- Grand Lake (St. Louis County, Minnesota)
- Grand Lake (Ohio)
- Grand Lake o' the Cherokees in Oklahoma

International

- East Grand Lake (part of the Chiputneticook Lakes)

== Communities ==
Canada

- Grand Lake, New Brunswick

United States

- Grand Lake, Colorado, a town
- Grand Lake, Oakland, California, a neighborhood
- Grand Lake, Louisiana, an unincorporated community in Cameron Parish
- Grand Lake Township, St. Louis County, Minnesota

== See also ==
- Grant Lake (disambiguation)
