= Ulysses S. Grant (disambiguation) =

Ulysses S. Grant (1822–1885) was the 18th president of the United States from 1869 to 1877 and a commanding general in the Union Army during the American Civil War.

Ulysses S. Grant may also refer to:

- Ulysses S. Grant Jr. (1852–1929), lawyer, son of Ulysses S. Grant
- Ulysses S. Grant III (1881–1968), general, grandson of Ulysses S. Grant and nephew of Ulysses S. Grant Jr.
- Ulysses S. Grant IV (1893–1977), palaeontologist, son of Ulysses S. Grant Jr. and cousin of Ulysses S. Grant III
- Ulysses Sherman Grant (1867–1932), geologist
- Ulysses Simpson Grant Sharp Jr. (1906–2001)
- USS Ulysses S. Grant, a submarine

== See also ==
- Presidency of Ulysses S. Grant
- USS Grant, several ships of the U.S. Navy
- President Grant (disambiguation)
- General Grant (disambiguation)
- Ulysses (disambiguation)
- Grant (disambiguation)
