= General Grant (disambiguation) =

Ulysses S. Grant (1822–1885) was a Union Army general in the American Civil War who later served as the 18th president of the United States from 1869 to 1877.

General Grant may also refer to:

== People ==
- Charles Grant (British Army officer) (1877–1940), British Army general
- Colquhoun Grant (British cavalry general) (1772–1835), British lieutenant general
- David Norvell Walker Grant (1891–1964), U.S. Army major general
- Frederick Dent Grant (1850–1912), U.S. Army major general and son of Ulysses S. Grant
- Henry Grant (British Army officer) (1848–1919), British Army general
- Hope Grant (1808–1875), British Army general
- Ian Lyall Grant (1915–2020), British Army major general
- James Grant (British Army officer, born 1720) (died 1806), British Army major general in the American Revolutionary War
- James Grant (British Army officer, born 1778) (died 1852), British Army major general
- Jennifer L. Grant (fl. 1990s–2020s), U.S. Air Force brigadier general
- John James Grant (born 1936), Canadian Army brigadier general
- Lewis Grant (colonial administrator) (1776–1852), British Army general and governor
- Lewis A. Grant (1828–1918), Union Army brigadier general and brevet major general during the American Civil War
- Malcolm Grant (East India Company officer) (1762–1831), British East India Company lieutenant general
- Patrick Grant (Indian Army officer) (1804–1895), British Army field marshal
- Scott Grant (born 1944), British Army lieutenant general
- Tim Grant (general) (fl. 1970s–2000s), Canadian Army major general
- William Grant (general) (1870–1939), Australian Army brigadier general
- William Keir Grant (1777–1852), British Army general
- Ulysses S. Grant III (1881–1968), U.S. Army major general and son of Frederick Dent Grant

== Places ==
- Kings Canyon National Park, which encompasses the Grant Grove and the former General Grant National Park
  - General Grant Grove, grove in Kings Canyon National Park and originally the entirety of General Grant National Park
    - General Grant Tree, the largest Giant Sequoia in the Grant Grove section of Kings Canyon National Park

== Transport ==
- USS General Grant, a gunboat during the American Civil War
- General Grant (sailing ship), a sailing ship
- Grant (M3 Lee), a type of tank

== See also ==
- USS Grant, several ships of the U.S. Navy
- Ulysses S. Grant (disambiguation)
- President Grant (disambiguation)
- General (disambiguation)
- Grant (disambiguation)
