= SS President Grant =

SS President Grant may refer to the following ships:

- SS President Grant originally the 1903 Servian, purchased by Hamburg Amerikanische Paketfahrt Actien-Gesellschaft renamed SS President Grant in 1907, interned and seized on U.S. entry into World War I, served as USS President Grant (SP-3014), transferred to U.S. Army and renamed USAT Republic alternately served Army and Navy as USS Republic (AP-33) and again as USAT Republic until sold for scrap 1952.
- SS President Grant (1920), a Design 1095 ship originally named Centennial State; renamed President Adams in 1923 and President Grant in 1940; WSA troop ship, wrecked at position 11°07′S 150°58′E on 26 April 1944
- SS President Grant (1921), a Design 1029 ship originally named Pine Tree State; renamed President Grant in 1923; taken over by the United States Navy in 1940 and converted to troop transport USS Harris (AP-8/APA-2); scrapped in 1948

== See also ==
- General Grant (ship)
- Grant (disambiguation)
