= Grant, Wisconsin =

Grant is the name of some places in the U.S. state of Wisconsin:

- Grant County, Wisconsin
- Grant, Clark County, Wisconsin, a town
- Grant, Dunn County, Wisconsin, a town
- Grant, Monroe County, Wisconsin, a town
- Grant, Portage County, Wisconsin, a town
- Grant, Rusk County, Wisconsin, a town
- Grant, Shawano County, Wisconsin, a town
