= President Grant (disambiguation) =

Ulysses S. Grant (1822–1885) was the 18th president of the United States

President Grant may also refer to:

- Fitzgerald Grant, fictional president of the United States in the TV series Scandal
- Mellie Grant, fictional president of the United States in the TV series Scandal

== See also ==
- USS Grant, several ships of the U.S. Navy
- Ulysses S. Grant (disambiguation)
- General Grant (disambiguation)
- Presidency of Ulysses S. Grant
