= Grant Thornton (disambiguation) =

Grant Thornton is a professional services network.

Grant Thornton may also refer to:

- Grant Thornton LLP, a U.S. accounting firm
- Raymond Chabot Grant Thornton, a Canadian accounting firm
- Grant Thornton Tower, an office tower in Chicago, Illinois, USA
- Grant Thornton (cricketer), a British cricket player

== See also ==
- Raymond Chabot Grant Thornton Park, a baseball stadium in Ottawa, Ontario, Canada
- Thornton (surname)
- Thornton (disambiguation)
- Grant (disambiguation)
