= Grant, Monroe County, Wisconsin =

Grant, Wisconsin
- Town
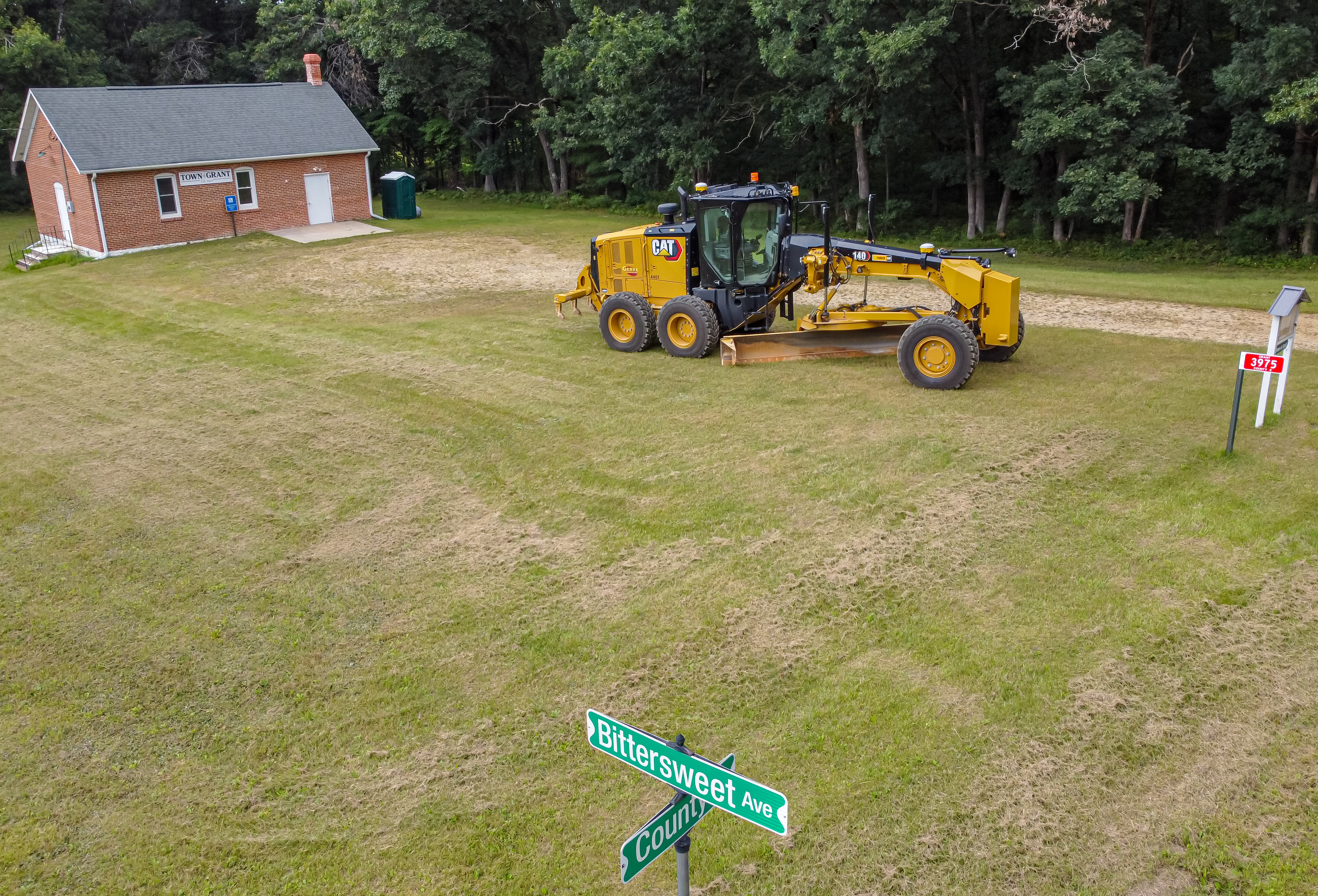
- Town hall

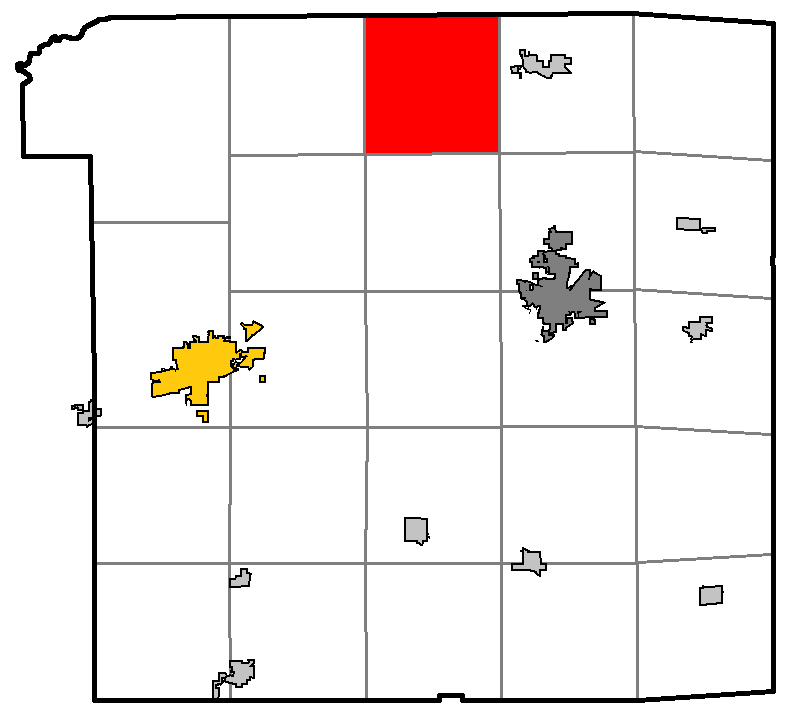
- Location of Grant, Monroe County, Wisconsin

- Location of Monroe County, Wisconsin
- Coordinates: 44°6′33″N 90°35′1″W
- Country: United States
- State: Wisconsin
- County: Monroe

Area
  - Total: 35.9 sq mi (93.0 km^{2})
  - Land: 35.8 sq mi (92.6 km^{2})
  - Water: 0.15 sq mi (0.4 km^{2})
- Elevation: 1,001 ft (305 m)

Population (2020)
  - Total: 469
  - Density: 13.1/sq mi (5.06/km^{2})
- Time zone: UTC-6 (Central (CST))
  - Summer (DST): UTC-5 (CDT)
- Area code: 608
- FIPS code: 55-30325
- GNIS feature ID: 1583300

Grant is a town in Monroe County, Wisconsin, United States. The population was 469 at the 2020 census.

== Geography ==
According to the United States Census Bureau, the town has a total area of 35.9 square miles (93.0 km^{2}), of which 35.7 square miles (92.6 km^{2}) is land and 0.2 square mile (0.4 km^{2}) (0.45%) is water.

== Demographics ==
As of the census of 2000, there were 483 people, 173 households, and 130 families residing in the town. The population density was 13.5 people per square mile (5.2/km^{2}). There were 211 housing units at an average density of 5.9 per square mile (2.3/km^{2}). The racial makeup of the town was 99.79% White and 0.21% Asian.

There were 173 households, out of which 33.5% had children under the age of 18 living with them, 64.2% were married couples living together, 6.9% had a female householder with no husband present, and 24.3% were non-families. 21.4% of all households were made up of individuals, and 6.9% had someone living alone who was 65 years of age or older. The average household size was 2.72 and the average family size was 3.12.

In the town, the population was spread out, with 26.1% under the age of 18, 6.8% from 18 to 24, 27.1% from 25 to 44, 29.2% from 45 to 64, and 10.8% who were 65 years of age or older. The median age was 40 years. For every 100 females, there were 101.3 males. For every 100 females age 18 and over, there were 105.2 males.

The median income for a household in the town was $43,456, and the median income for a family was $46,042. Males had a median income of $27,500 versus $24,583 for females. The per capita income for the town was $16,751. About 3.0% of families and 3.7% of the population were below the poverty line, including 5.4% of those under age 18 and none of those age 65 or over.
