= Grant County =

Grant County may refer to:

== Places ==
Australia

- County of Grant, Victoria

United States

- Grant County, Arkansas
- Grant County, Indiana
- Grant County, Kansas
- Grant County, Kentucky
- Grant County, Minnesota
- Grant County, Nebraska
- Grant County, New Mexico
- Grant County, North Dakota
- Grant County, Oklahoma
- Grant County, Oregon
- Grant County, South Dakota
- Grant County, Washington
- Grant County, West Virginia
- Grant County, Wisconsin

== Other uses ==
- Grant County, Georgia, a fictional place in the works of Karin Slaughter

== See also ==
- Grant Parish, Louisiana
