= Grand Lake (Timiskaming District) =

- Location of Grand Lake in Ontario.
- Location: Timiskaming, Ontario, Canada
- Coordinates: 47°33′50″N 80°55′49″W
- Type: Lake
- Part of: Ottawa River drainage basin
- Primary inflows: Wampus Creek
- Max. length: 1.2 km (0.75 mi)
- Max. width: 0.4 km (0.25 mi)
- Surface elevation: 340 m (1,120 ft)

Grand Lake is a lake in the Ottawa River drainage basin in the Unorganized West Part of Timiskaming District in Northeastern Ontario, Canada.

The lake is 1.2 kilometres (0.7 mi) long and 0.4 kilometres (0.2 mi) wide and lies at an elevation of 340 metres (1,115 ft) about 15 kilometres (9 mi) south west of the community of Gowganda. The primary inflows are Wampus Creek at the southwest and an unnamed creek arriving from Fisher Lake at the west, and the primary outflow is also Wampus Creek at the northeast, which flows via the West Montreal River, the Montreal River and Lake Timiskaming to the Ottawa River.
