= Grant Lake (Douglas County, Minnesota) =

Lake in the state of Minnesota, United States

- Location within Minnesota
- Location: Douglas County, Minnesota, United States
- Coordinates: 45°49′38″N 95°32′40″W

Grant Lake is a lake in Douglas County, in the U.S. state of Minnesota.

Grant Lake was named for Noah Grant, a pioneer who settled nearby in 1858.

== See also ==
- List of lakes in Minnesota
