= Grant (automobile) =

Defunct American motor vehicle manufacturer

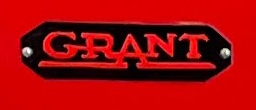
- Industry: Automobiles
- Founded: 1913; 113 years ago
- Founder: George and Charles Grant
- Defunct: 1922; 104 years ago
- Fate: Receivership, factory sold to Lincoln Electric Company
- Headquarters: Detroit Michigan (1913) Findlay Ohio (1913-1916) Cleveland Ohio (1916-1922)
- Number of employees: 600 (1916)

The Grant Motor Co was an American automobile manufacturing company from 1913 to 1922, based in Detroit Michigan for its first year then Findlay, Ohio. The company produced several thousand four- and six-cylinder automobiles, and exported cars to England as Whiting-Grant. In 1916, a five-passenger touring car produced by the company sold for US$795.

== History ==
=== Grant Brothers Auto Company ===
The history of the Grant automobile can be traced back to at least 1907 with the Grant Bros. Auto Co. in Detroit. Where the brothers George D. Grant and Charles A. Grant were running an automobile dealership in Detroit selling Thomas Flyers, Thomas Detroit and Buick cars. Their locations were at 1000 Woodward Avenue and 742 Woodward Avenue.

One of the Grant Brothers on May 2 1908 would participate on a three day 400 mile reliability run in the Detroit area. Grant would be driving a 40 horsepower Thomas Detroit. Another employee would drive a Thomas Forty. The roads were rough and unpaved and many cars had breakdowns and a few did not finish. Both cars driven by the Grant Bros. Co. would earn perfect scores.

By 1910 Grant Bros. was selling Chalmers cars exclusively. this would later change to Everitt and then to Lozier.

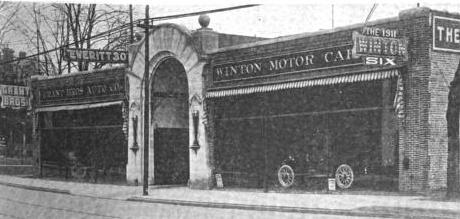
Grant Bros. Dealership Circa 1910

Grant Bros. would have an unusual arrangement where their dealership would occupy half of the building, the other half being occupied by the Winton Motor Carriage Company. The 97x20 foot building would be split in half with the left side being used by Grant and the right side being used by Winton.

1914 would be the last year that Grant Bros. would be mentioned by trade journals or advertisements. By 1914 the purpose of Grant Bros. was to distribute Grant built cars for Michigan. Presumably in 1914 Grant Bros. would either crease to exist or would be absorbed by the successor firm.

=== Grant Motor Company ===
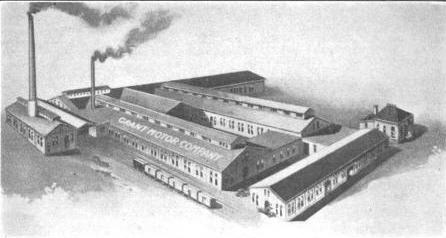
Grant Factory Findlay, Ohio Circa 1914

On May 24th 1913 the Grant Motor Co. would be incorporated in Detroit with a capitalization of $100,000 to manufacture cyclecars. The Grant brothers would lead the firm with George acting as president and Charles as vice president and sales manager. David Shaw would be the company's secretary and treasurer along with G.F. Salzman and J.M. Howe who would work as manager and engineer respectively. Citing overwhelming demand for their cars and a need to produce enough vehicles capitalization would be increased from $100,000 to $165,000 and then later to $200,000 to fund the expansion of the company.

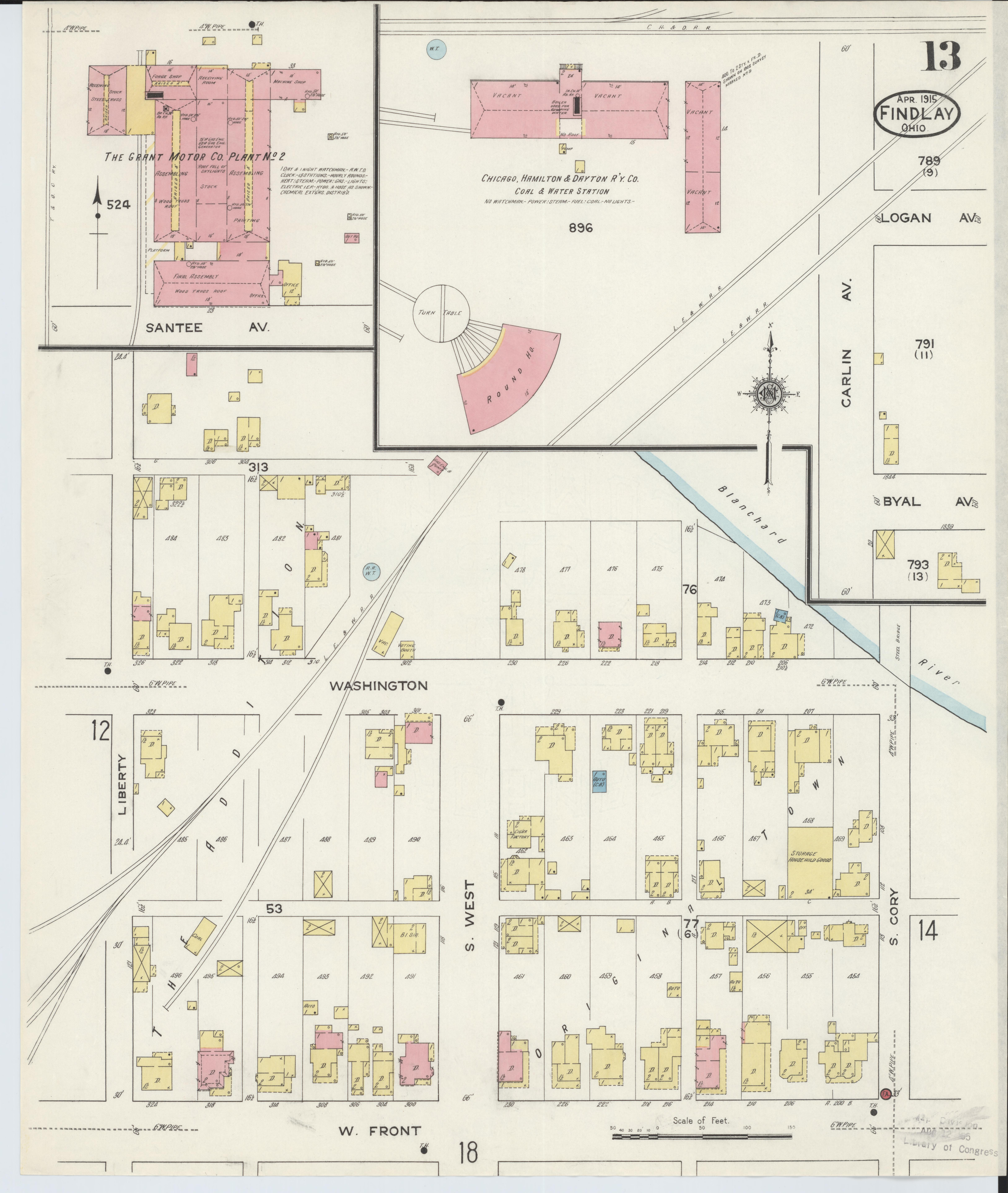
Grant Motor Co Plant No.2 in Findlay

In late 1913 production would shift from Detroit to Findlay Ohio after less than a year of manufacturing in Detroit. The reason for the move to Findlay was that there was a vacant factory that was previously occupied by the Findlay Motor Company. Findlay Motor Company had been placed into the hands of a receiver two years prior. Grant publicly apologized for leaving Detroit, but with enough supplies to make over 5000 cars, and probably a factory not large enough to build such a quantity quickly enough, a larger factory was necessary for success. Shortly after purchasing the plant the supplies were moved from Detroit to Findlay.

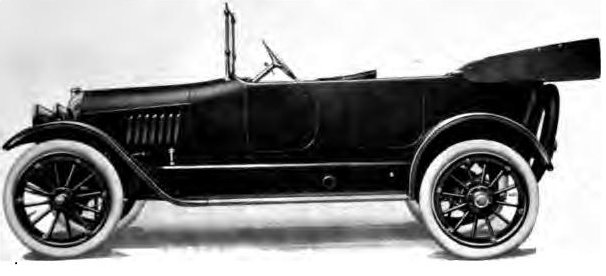
1916 Grant Touring Car

By 1914 Grant would begin to pivot away from cyclecars to a larger six cylinder car. Demand was very strong and to facilitate production demands Grant would lease a 40,000 square foot factory that was previously occupied by the Finding Table Co. The initial production rate was planned for 50 cars a day or roughly double the previous production capacity. Production for 1914 was around 2,174 cars

In 1915 Charles Grant would be replaced as president by David A. Shaw. Charles would remain on the board of directors. A need for space was still a pressing issue and the company would again expand with three one acre building expansions. By November production was at 650 cars per month and employed 250 workers, production for 1915 was around 5,260 cars.

=== Grant Motor Car Corporation ===
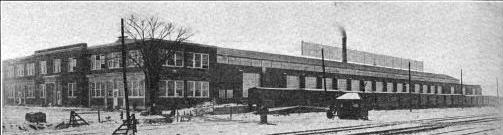
Grant Factory Cleveland Circa 1916

It was announced in early 1916 that the Grant Motor Company would be reorganized and the assets would be transferred to a successor corporation called the Grant Motor Car Corporation. The new firm would be capitalized at $4,000,000. The officers would all retain their same jobs. The company would once again change cities, this time the company would move to Cleveland Ohio, the change was announced in early 1916 after the recapitalization. A brand new factory and office building would be constructed for $200,000. The factory would be 124,000 or 150,000 sq. ft depending on source, or almost double the size of the previous plant. The workforce has increased to nearly 600 workers. It was estimated that the plant would be finished by July. Planned production was 15,000 cars

In mid 1917 Grant would purchase the Deneen Motor Company of Cleveland. Deneen had been making trucks under its Denmo brand. At the time of purchase Denmo had six models in its lineup froma 3/4 ton truck all the way up to a 2 1/2 ton truck. With this purchase Grant would now move into the truck making business and would have a network of over 1200 truck dealers. Estimated for truck production were for 10,000 a year. After the purchase the Denmo factory would be expanded. By late 1917 the Denmo brand would be phased out and the trucks would be marketed under the Grant name. During the war Grant would assemble standardized 1 1/2 ton four wheeled trailers for the military. Planned production for 1917 was 15,000 cars which may or may not include truck figures.

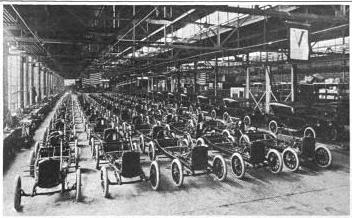
One day of production November 1919

After focusing production during the war on trucks and trailers Grant would in 1919 announce a price reduction of $130 for its cars. Production for the year would be estimated at 12,000.

In late 1920 Grant would purchase to engine builder H.J, Walker Company. For 1920 optimism for the redesigned car was high but problems were looming for the company. The post war depression had hit the firm and in December and a note of an unspecified amount was taken out to keep the company afloat. The company would describe the difficulties being faced as existential threats. The company expected for 1920 to produce 20,000 cars; almost double its previous output.

In early 1921 it was announced that production of trucks would be stopped to focus on car sales.

=== Receivership ===
The company would continue to struggle financially, for the 1920 sales year Grant had vastly over estimated how many cars they would sell and had an enormous amount of parts to make cars that were in low demand. The company would have over $500,000 in inventory and slow sales. It was even said at one time that the company had more crankcases on hand than dollars. To stay afloat Grant would sell the H.J Walker Company that it had acquired previously, but this was not enough. In October of 1922 Grant would be placed into the hands of a receiver. In a reversal of previous announcements Grant would cease production of their cars, but continue truck production during receivership. In June of 1923 the plant would be sold to Lincoln Electric Corporation for $425,000

== Models ==
=== Cyclecar (Model M) ===
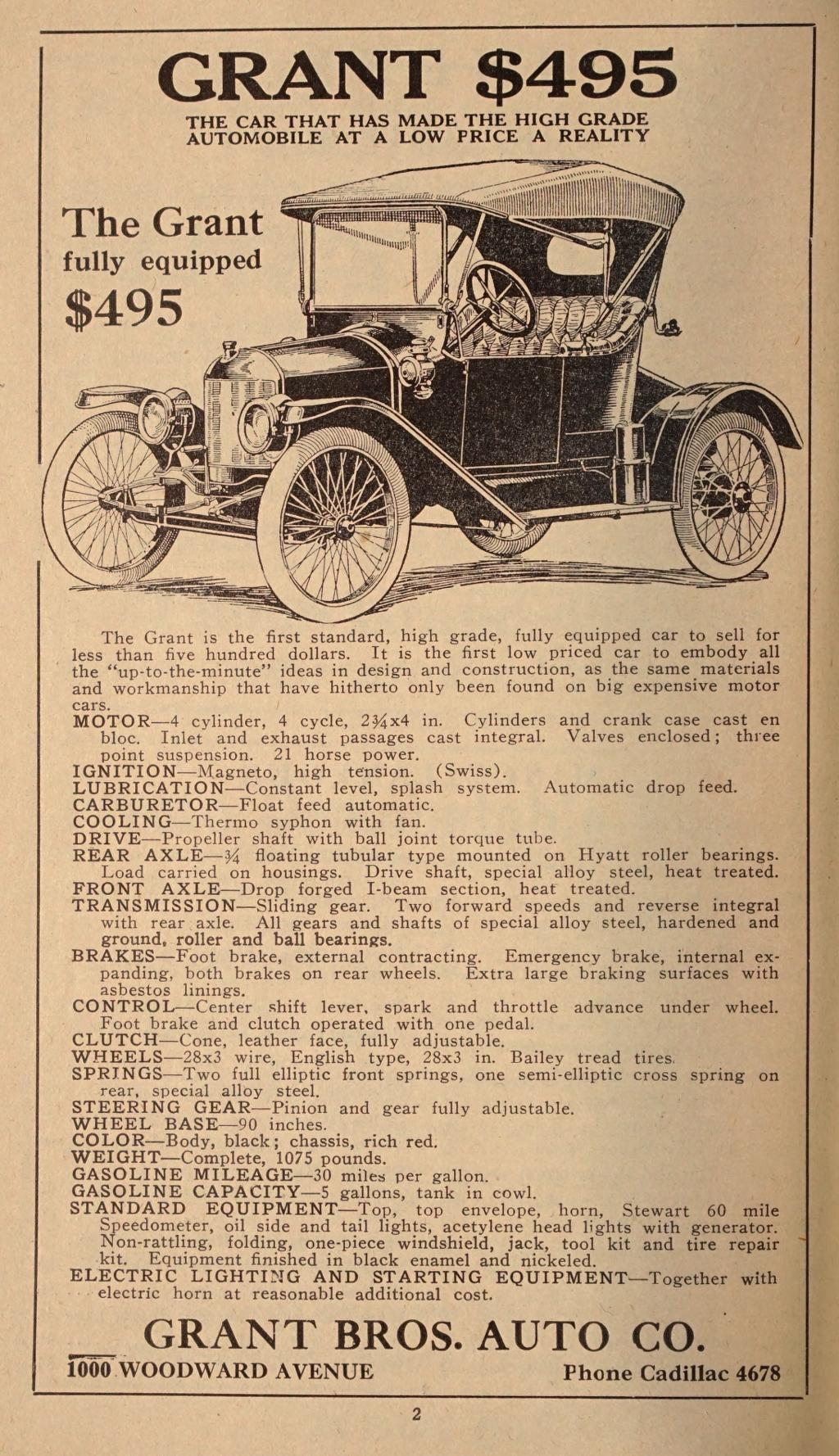
1914 Grant Model M Cyclecar Advertisement

The first car offered by Grant would be the Model M. A small cyclecar with seating for two that would go on sale in early 1913. The car would be offered in one body style only with left hand drive and center controls. The Model M would be powered by a 16 horsepower four cylinder L head engine that was made in-house. A Mayer carburetor and Bosch magneto were standard. Cooling was by thermo-syphon with no water pump. There were two forward gears and a reverse. Advertising indicated that the car could achieve 30 to 35 miles per gallon. The initial price was $495, but would be reduced to $425 for mid 1914. Gas lighting would be standard, but for $80 a buyer could get electric lights and an electric starter. The weight was 1,075 pounds.

=== Grant Six (Model T) ===
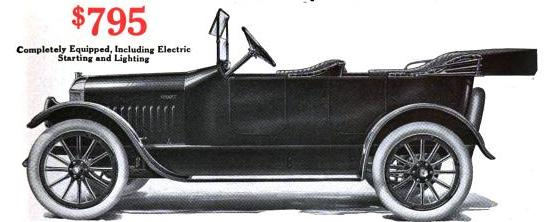
1915 Grant Model T

In late 1914 a new six cylinder model was announced to the public. Known publicly as "The Grant Popular-Priced Six" or more simply the "Grant Six". It is unclear if the intention was for the Six to replace or supplement the cyclecar, but shortly after the cyclecar would cease to be advertised. The Six was offered in two body styles initially; a two passenger roadster, and a five passenger touring car. A cabriolet would be added in 1915. Power was provided by an overhead valve six cylinder engine making 33-36 horsepower. The wheelbase was 106 inches. Electric lighting was provided with two bulbs per headlight bracket as a high and low beam. A Prest-O-Lite gas lighting system was also available as a cheaper option. The lighting would come from Allis-Chalmers, and ignition from Atwater Kent. Miles per gallon was 25 with five people in the car. The touring car and roadster were listed for $795 ($750 with Prest-O-Lite system) A major selling point for the Grant was that it was an exceptionally low priced six cylinder car, where most six cylinder cars were priced above $1000; the Grant was well below that.

=== Grant Six (Model V) ===
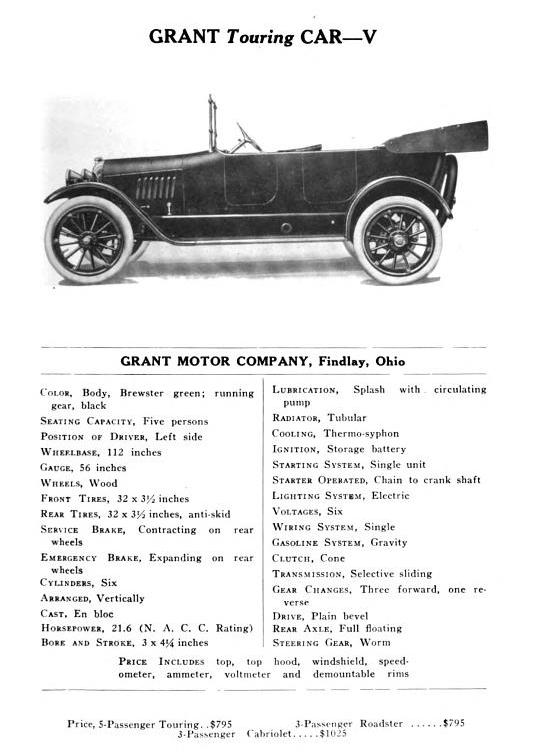
1916 Grant Model V

The 1916 Model V would be a continuation of the earlier Model T. The wheelbase was increased from 106 inches to 112. The motor increased in size slightly and so did the gas tank. There was a new radiator design, a relatively easy way to distinguish models is the Model V has sloping side louvers and the Model T's are straight. Horsepower was rated between 33-36.

=== Grant Six (Model K) ===
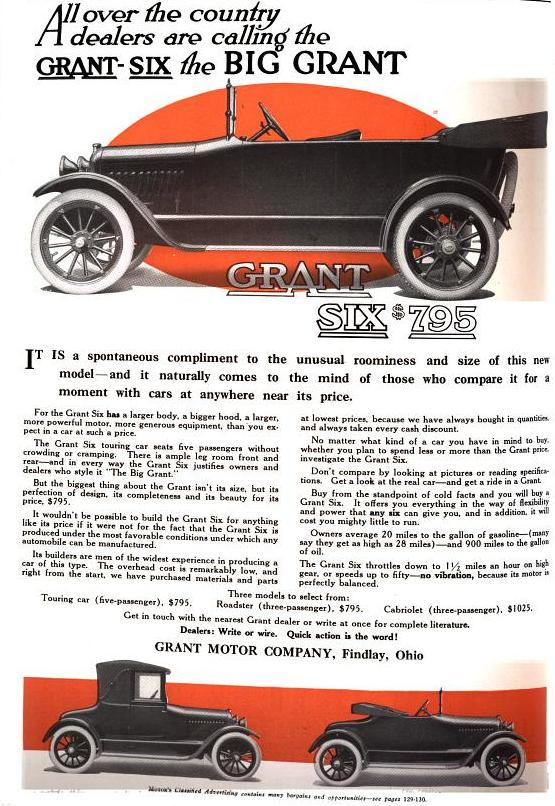
1915 Grant Model K Advertisement

The 1917 Model K would once again be an evolution of the line, once again sitting on a 112 inch wheelbase with an overhead valve six cylinder engine. Prices would be $825 for a three passenger roadster, and five passenger touring car. A three passenger cabriolet would be added for $1050. Starting and lighting would be provided now by Wagner. Ignition would be by Remy. A Stomberg Carburetor was standard. Cooling was by thermo-siphon. The Model K is distinguishable from the Model V by the increased number of side louvers.

=== Grant Six (Model G) ===
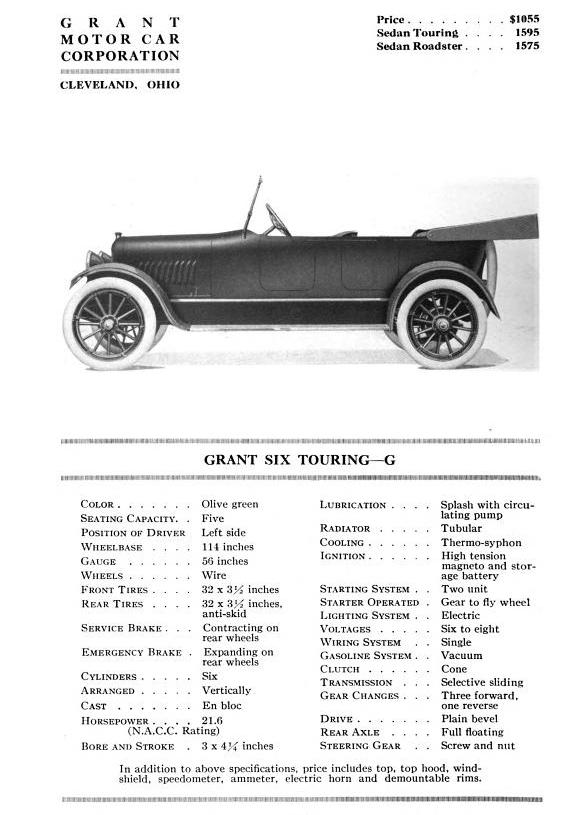
1918 Grant Model G

For 1918 the wheelbase would once again increase. This time it would increase 2 inches to 114. A new nickle radiator would be offered and new fenders. The front seats could not be adjusted individually. A total of five body styles were available for the Model G, a five passenger touring car, a three passenger roadster, both selling for $1055, a five passenger detachable sedan at $1350, a three passenger convertible coupe for $1575 and a give passenger convertible sedan for $1595. The motor was largely the same. The Model G can be distinguished from earlier cars by either the closed body style offered, or the sloping windshield in open cars.

=== Grant Six (Model H) ===
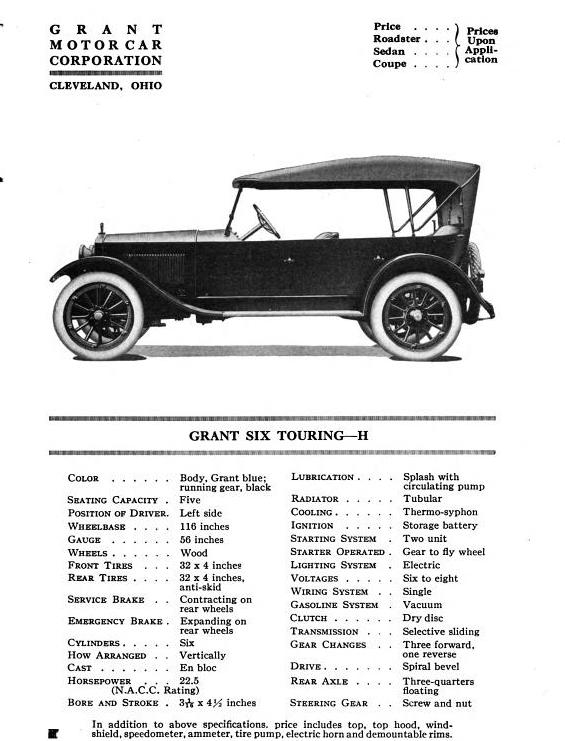
1920 Grant Model H

After producing the Model G largely unchanged for two years; Grant would unveil a totally new car. Unlike the previous models with rounded radiators, the new model would sport an angular grille and a thoroughly modern look. Advertising would begin to shift during this time too. The cars were increasingly being advertised as luxury products as opposed to the very value oriented model like in 1914. The wheelbase was now 116 inches, the engine made 44 horsepower. the transmission was a Durston three speed. There were four body styles, a five passenger touring and three passenger roadster for $1495, a four door sedan and a three passenger coupe for $2450.

==== Grant Special ====
A sub model of the Model H was known as the grant special and was introduced in late 1921, the Special was built on the same chassis, but was more affordable and with less options. The price was $1,285 for a touring car and $1,950 for the sedan and coupe.

=== Trucks ===
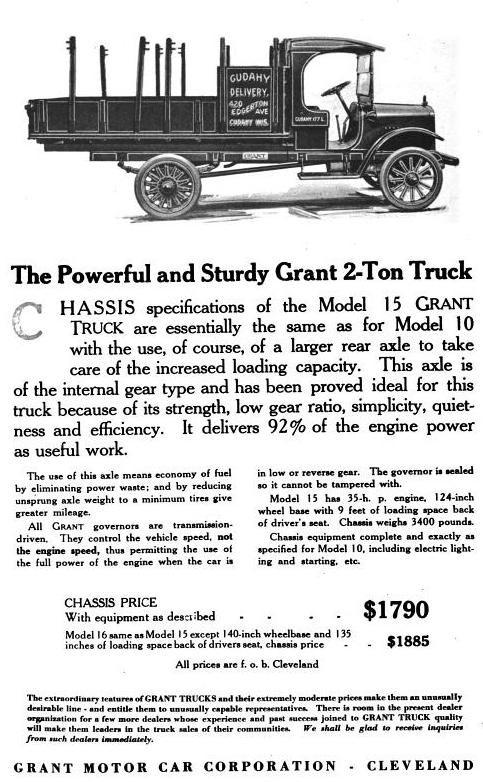
1918 Grant Model 15

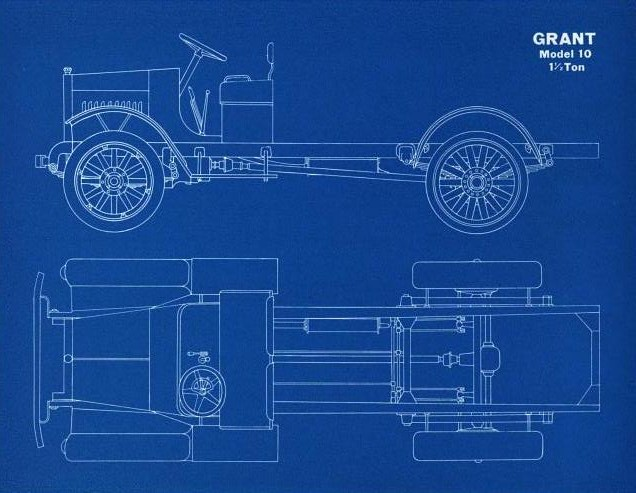
Grant Model 10

After purchasing the Deneen Motor Company Grant would replace the Denmo truck brand with Grant branding. The lineup initially in 1917 would include three models. The model 12 with a 1800 pound payload capacity. The Model 10 with a 1 1/2 ton capacity. The Model 15 with a 2 ton capacity. A Model 11 was a Model 10 with a longer wheelbase. And the Model 16 is a longer wheelbase model 15. The trucks were essentially early badge engineered vehicles having all been designed by the previous company. The smallest truck used a four cylinder engine. Pneumatic tires were standard on the front wheels with solid tires on the rear. Electric lighting and starting was standard. In late 1917 prices for the Model 12 were between $1,020 to $1065 depending on body style. The remaining models were chassis only. The Model 10 was $1,490 the Model 11 was $1,585, the Model 15 $1,790 and the Model 6 $1,885.

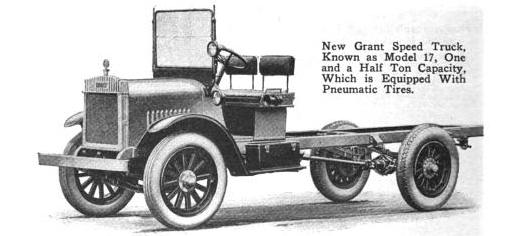
Grant Model 17

In 1920 the truck lineup would be trimmed down to a single model. The new model 17. A truck with 1 1/2 ton capacity. The truck had a 140 inch wheelbase and weighed 3,550 pounds. The truck was sold a chassis and the price for August 1920 was $2,675. Pneumatic tires were available front and rear. Engines were provided by Continental and was a four cylinder engine making 30 horsepower. A carter carburetor was used and Splitdorf ignition. Cooling was by thermo-siphon. It was a left hand drive truck. This was likely the last truck model offered by Grant before the company would close 2 less than two years later.

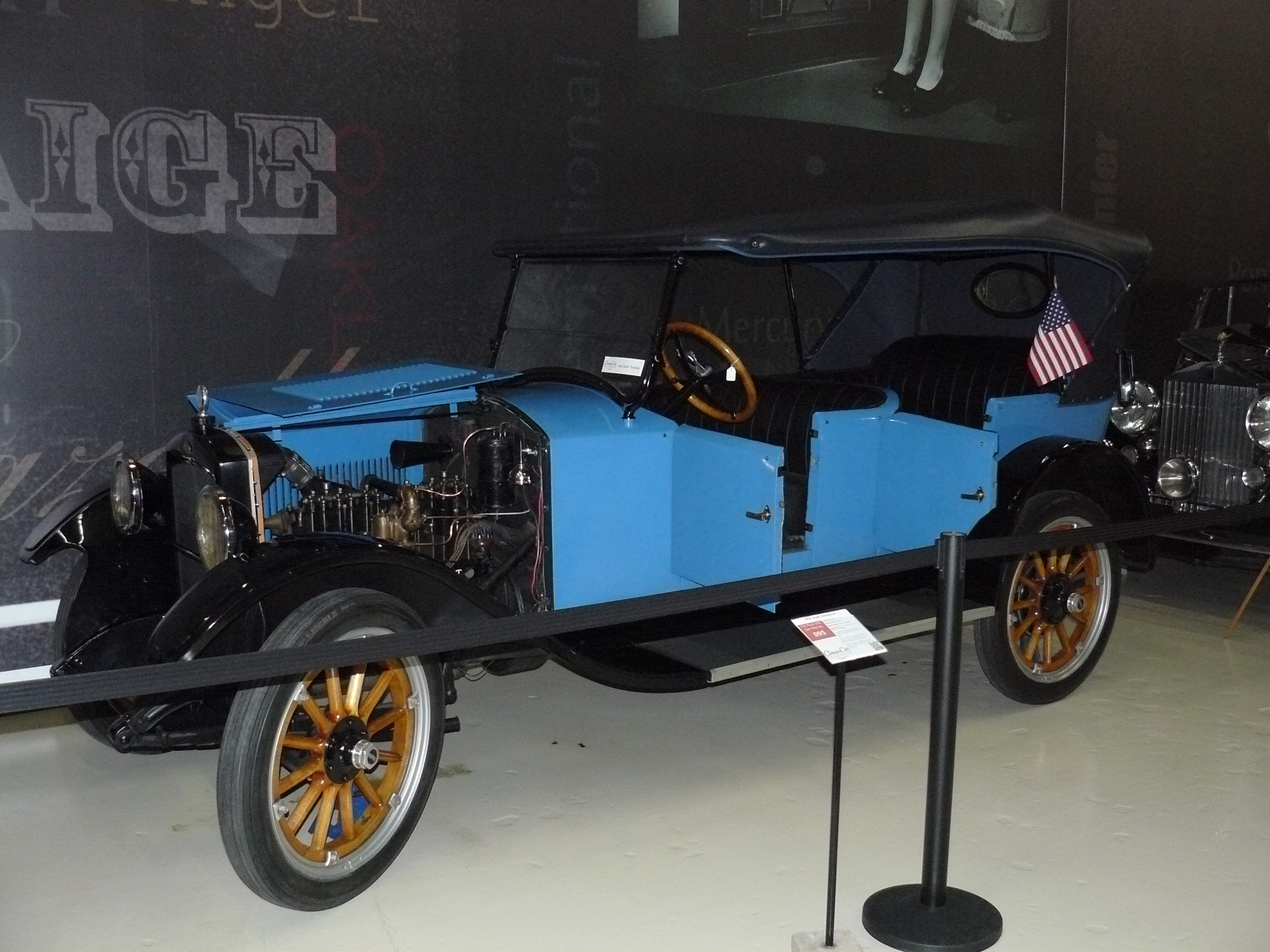
1920 Grant Touring Car

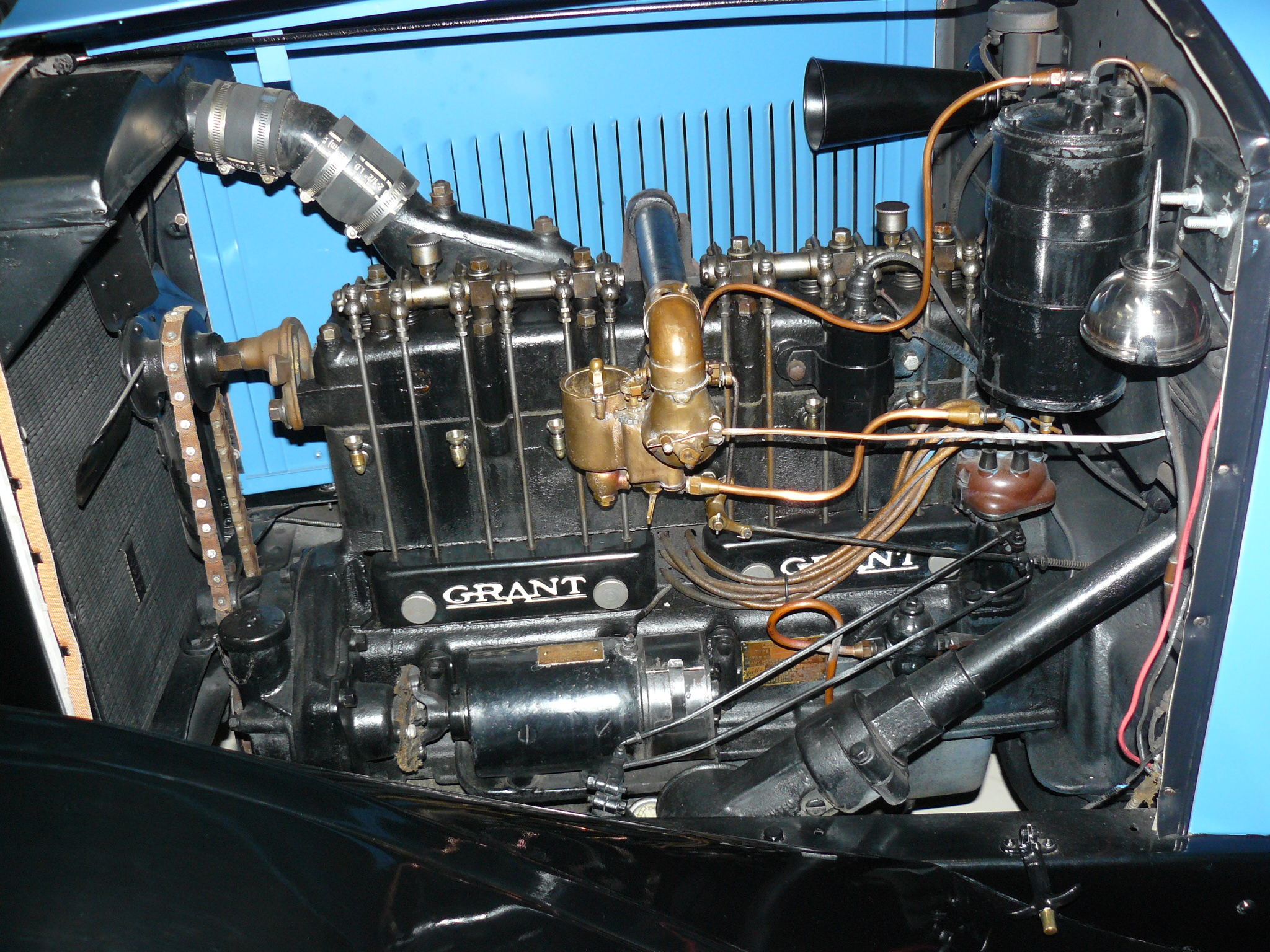
1920 Grant Touring Car engine

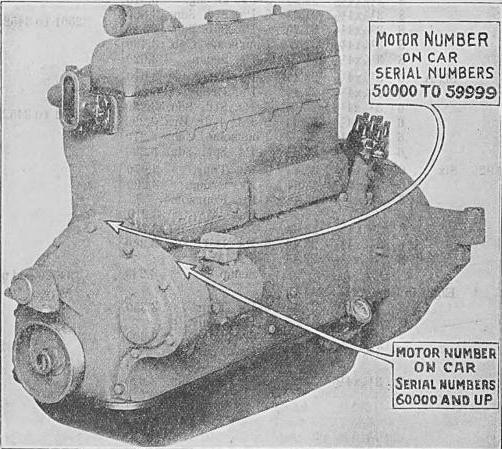
Serial Number Location for Grant Cars 50000 and up

== Overview of production figures ==
Year	Production according to Seltzer, Lawrence H.	Production	Model	Serial number
1913		~200	M	0 to ~199
1914	3,400	~ 2,834	M	~199 to 3033
1915	2,800	2,054	T	5000 to 7053
1916	6,900	4,003	V	10000 to 14002
1917	7,500	12,001	K	15000 to 27000
1918	6,300	~ 5,000	G	30001 to ~35000
1919	5,000	~ 5,000	GX	~ 35000 to 40001
1920	3,500	6,000	H	50001 to 56000
		↑	HX	↑
1921	2,500	~ 5,000	HY	60001 to ..
		↑	HZ	↑
1922	500	~ 2,000	HZ	65000 to ..
Sum	38,400	≥ 50,000		

== See also ==
- Brass Era car
