= Grant Lake (Santa Clara County, California) =

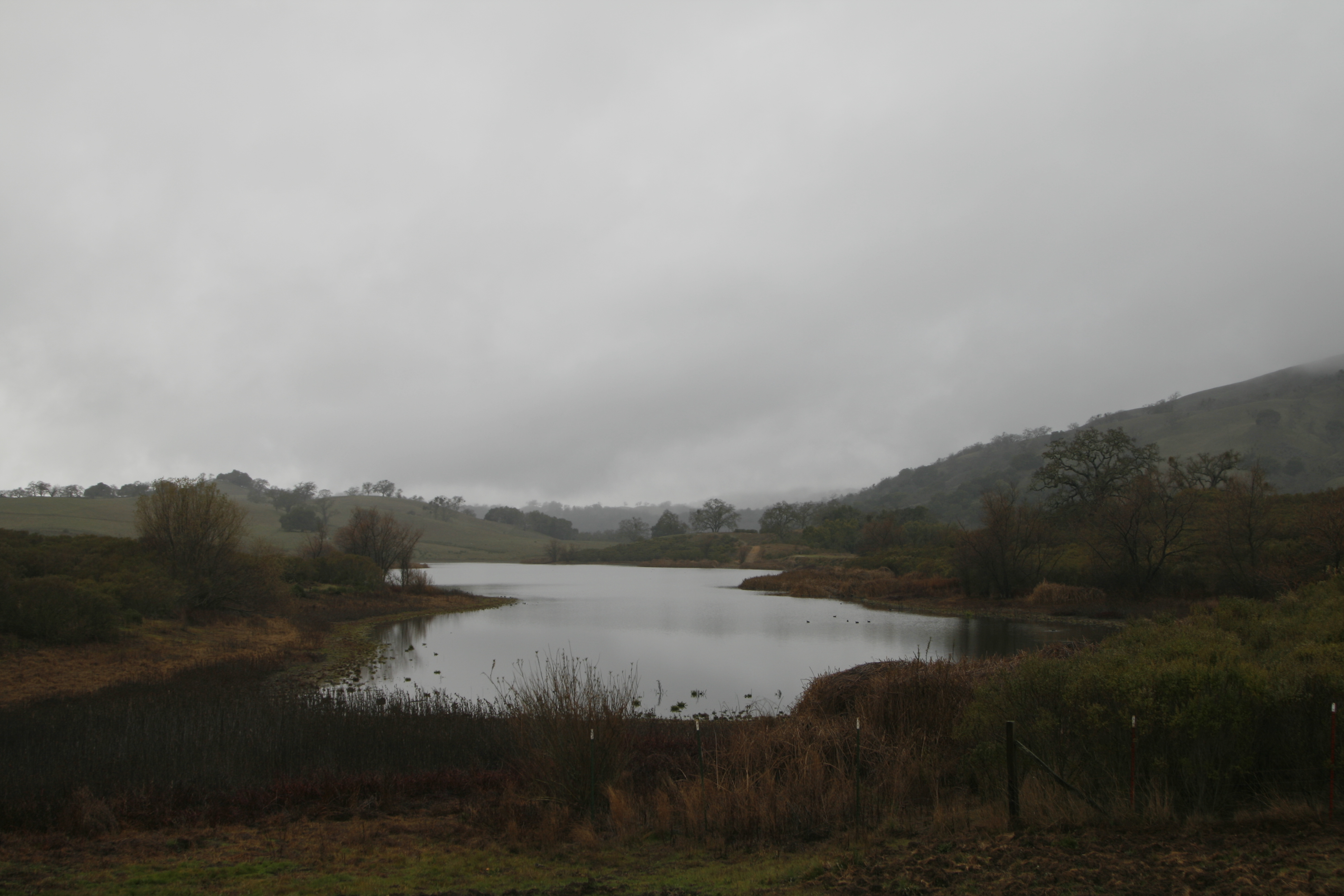
- Grant Lake in February 2008

- Location within California Location within the United States
- Location: Santa Clara County, California
- Coordinates: 37°20′45″N 121°43′09″W
- Type: reservoir
- Primary outflows: Unnamed tributary of San Felipe Creek
- Basin countries: United States
- Managing agency: Santa Clara Valley Water District
- Surface elevation: 1,598 ft (487 m)

Grant Lake, also called Halls Valley Lake, is an artificial lake located in Santa Clara County, California. It is located 1,598 ft (487 m) above sea level within Joseph D. Grant County Park. Its outflow is an unnamed tributary of San Felipe Creek, which is in turn, tributary to Coyote Creek and thence to south San Francisco Bay.

== See also ==
- List of dams and reservoirs in California
- List of lakes in California
- List of lakes in the San Francisco Bay Area
