= Grant Lake (Mono County, California) =

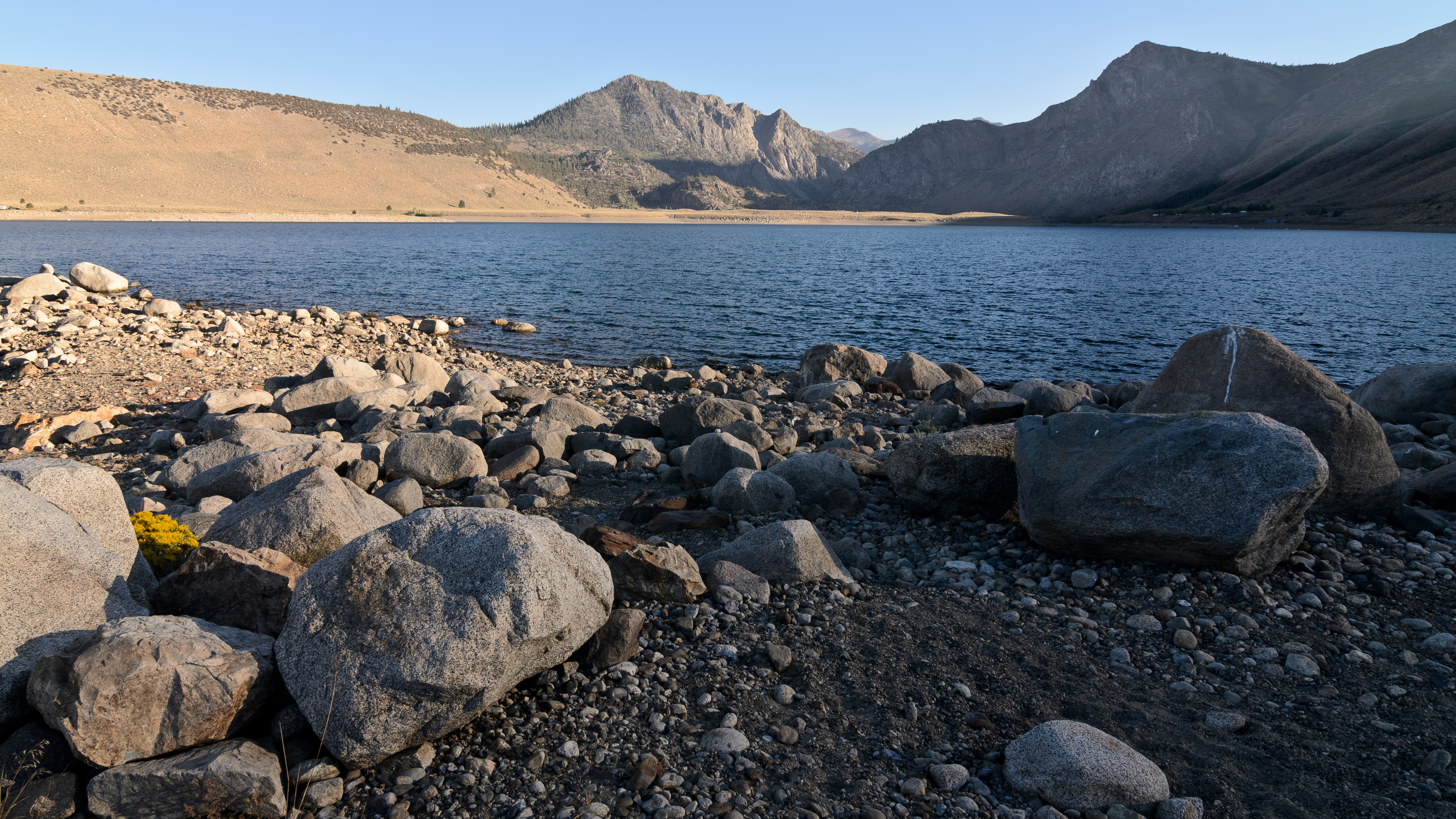
- Grant Lake in September 2016

- Location within California Location within the United States
- Location: Mono County, California
- Coordinates: 37°50′24″N 119°6′41″W
- Type: reservoir
- Basin countries: United States
- Surface elevation: 7,136 ft (2,175 m)

Grant Lake is an artificial lake located in Mono County, California. It is located 7,136 ft (2,175 m) above sea level within Inyo National Forest.

== See also ==
- List of lakes in California
