= Grant, Inyo County, California =

Unincorporated community in California, United States

Grant
- Unincorporated community
- Location in California Grant (the United States)
- Coordinates: 36°15′20″N 117°59′38″W
- Country: United States
- State: California
- County: Inyo
- Elevation: 3,730 ft (1,137 m)

Grant is an unincorporated community in Inyo County, California, United States. It lies at an elevation of 3730 feet (1137 m). There are two alfalfa ranches and several families living in the area. Originally served by U.S. Route 395, the town has since been bypassed and is now served by an extension of California State Route 190.
