= Grand Lake (St. Louis County, Minnesota) =

Lake in the state of Minnesota, United States

- Location within Minnesota
- Location: St. Louis County, Minnesota
- Coordinates: 46°52′32″N 92°24′13″W
- Type: lake

Grand Lake is a lake in St. Louis County, in the U.S. state of Minnesota.

Grand Lake was so named on account of its relatively large size.

== See also ==
- List of lakes in Minnesota
