= USS General Grant =

Gunboat of the United States Navy

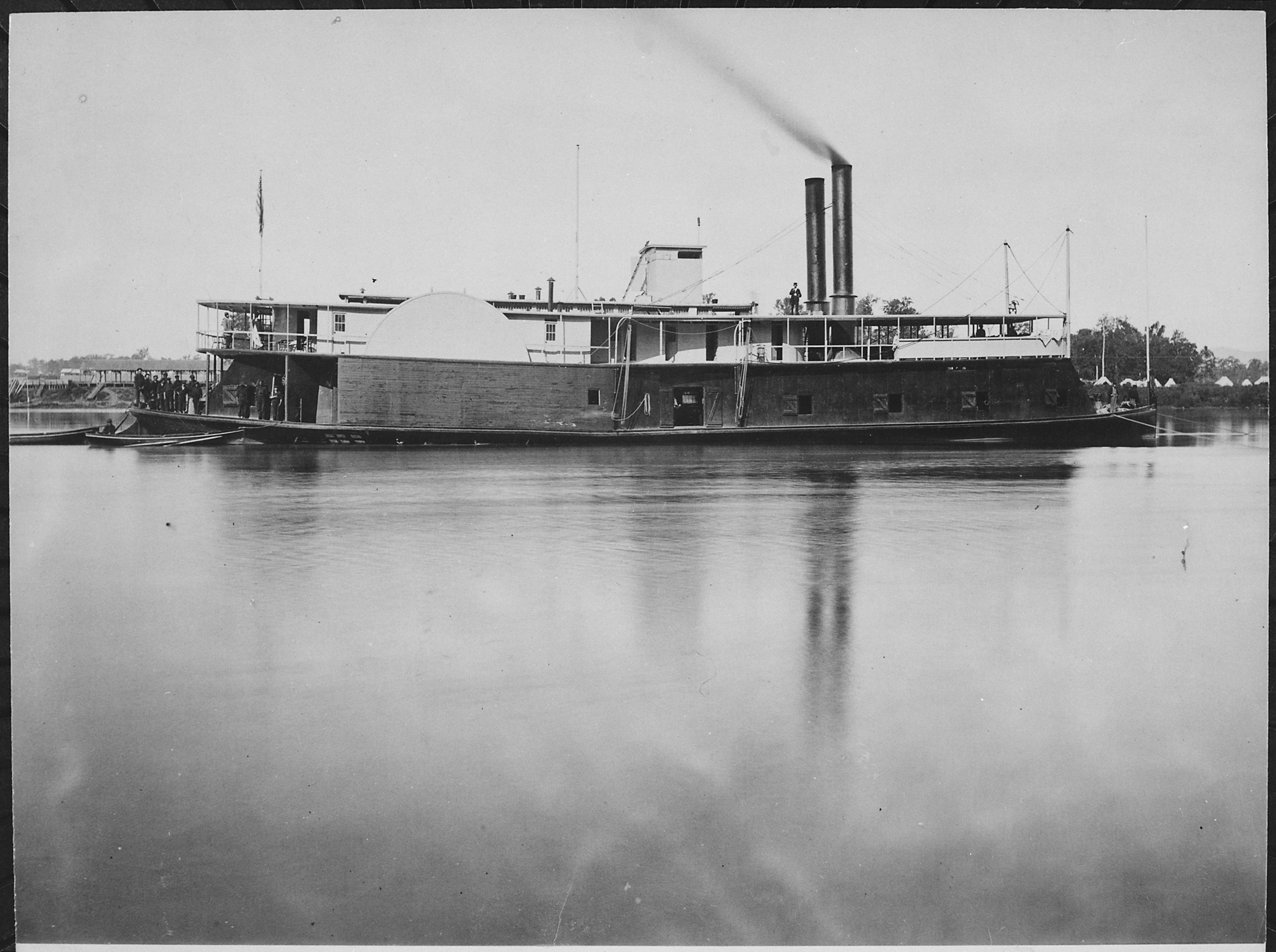
- General Grant in 1864

History

United States
- Laid down: date unknown
- Launched: 1863
- Acquired: 20 July 1864
- Commissioned: 20 July 1864
- Decommissioned: 2 June 1865
- Stricken: 1865 (est.)
- Fate: Returned to the War Department; 2 June 1865

General characteristics
- Displacement: 201 tons
- Length: 171 ft (52 m)
- Beam: 26 ft (7.9 m)
- Draught: depth of hold 4 ft 9 in (1.45 m)
- Propulsion: steam engine; side wheel-propelled
- Speed: not known
- Complement: not known
- Armament: two 30-pounder guns; two 24-pounder howitzers

USS General Grant was a steamship chartered from the U.S. War Department by the Union Navy during the American Civil War. She was used by the Navy as a gunboat in waterways of the Confederate South.

== Constructed in Pennsylvania in 1863 ==
General Grant was built in 1863 at Monongahela, Pennsylvania; purchased by the War Department; chartered by the Navy and commissioned at Bridgeport, Alabama, 20 July 1864, Acting Master Joseph Watson in command.

== Patrolling the Tennessee River ==
General Grant constantly patrolled the upper Tennessee River from Bridgeport until close of the Civil War, fighting guerrillas and aiding the Union Army in clearing Confederate troops from the region.

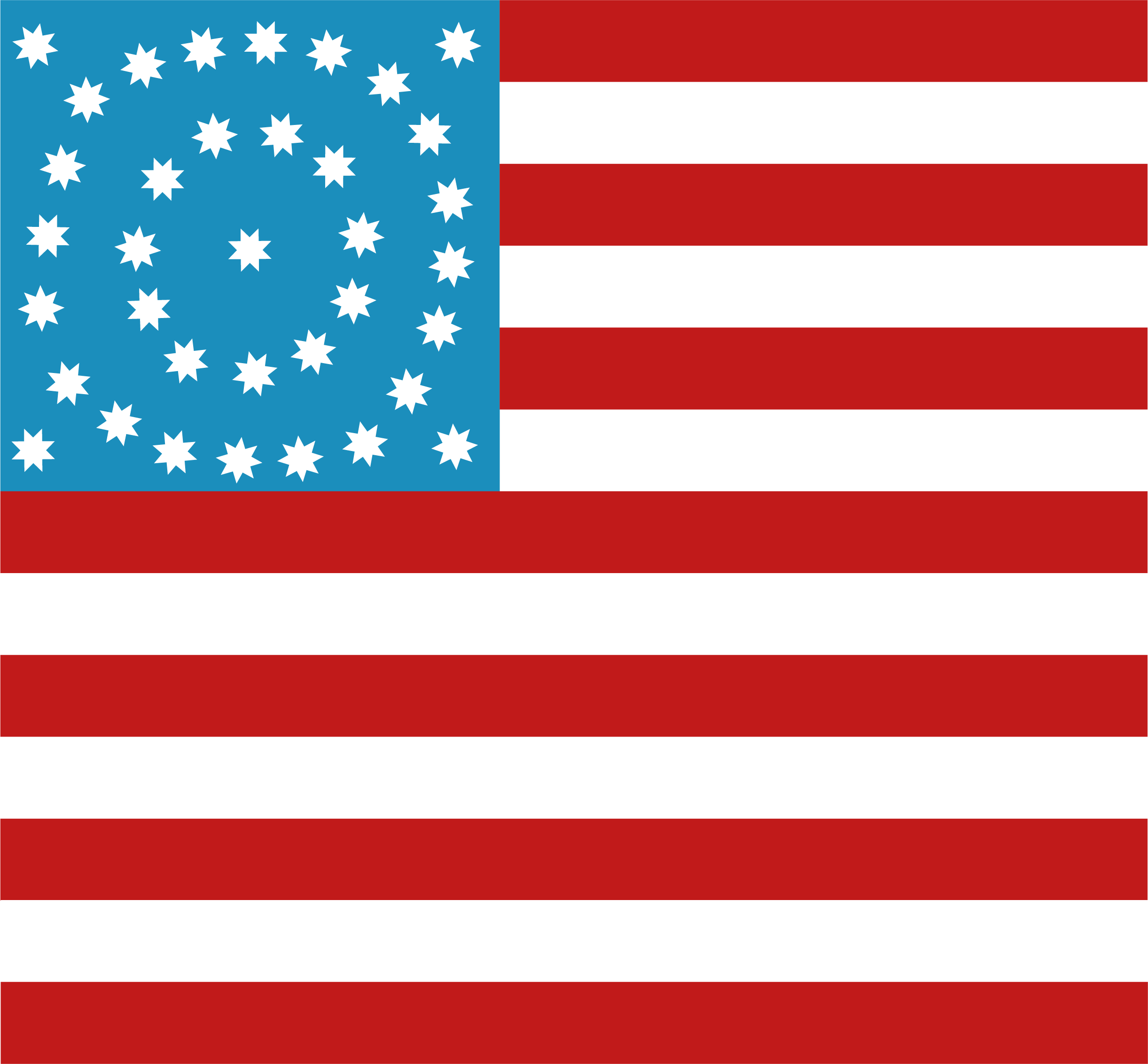
36 star US flag flown from the ship

=== River operations under fire ===
In October 1864 she destroyed 22 small boats off Port Deposit and Crow Island. On 25 November she assisted in taking up pontoon bridges under guns of Confederate sharpshooters at Decatur, Alabama. She hurled 52 shells into that town 12 December 1864 and joined USS General Thomas 15 January 1865 in the destructive bombardment of Guntersville, Alabama.

== Post-war decommissioning, sale, and subsequent career ==
She decommissioned and was returned to the War Department 2 June 1865. She was lost when stranded in ice 18 March 1866 at Plattsmouth, Nebraska.
