= USS Grant =

Only one American ship has been named USS Grant, but many ships were given similar names, mostly named after United States Army general and President of the United States Ulysses S. Grant.

- General Grant (sailing ship), a three-masted bark built in 1864 and wrecked in 1866
- USS Albert W. Grant, a U.S. Navy destroyer named after a U.S. Navy admiral, in commission from 1943 to 1946
- USS General Grant, a U.S. Army steamer chartered by, and in commission in, the U.S. Navy from 1864 to 1865
- USRC Grant, a revenue cutter of the United States Revenue-Marine and United States Revenue Cutter Service, in commission from 1872 to 1906
- USS Grant County, a U.S. Navy tank landing ship in commission from 1957 to 1973, named after fifteen counties, some of which were named after Ulysses S. Grant
- USS Republic, a U.S. Navy troop transport which was in commission from 1917 to 1919 as USS President Grant (ID-3014) and from 1941 to 1945 as USS Republic (AP-33) from 1941 to 1945
- USS U. S. Grant, a U.S. Navy troop transport in commission in the U.S. Navy and U.S. Army from 1917 to 1922 as USS Madawaska (ID-3011) and in the U.S. Army and U.S. Navy as USS U. S. Grant (AP-29) from 1922 to 1945
- USS Ulysses S. Grant, a U.S. Navy ballistic missile submarine in commission from 1963 to 1992

== See also ==
- SS President Grant
- Grant (disambiguation)
