= John Steinbeck House =

John Steinbeck House may refer to:

- John Steinbeck House (Monte Sereno, California), listed on the National Register of Historic Places in Santa Clara County, California
- John Steinbeck House (Salinas, California), listed on the National Register of Historic Places in Monterey County, California
