= Monte Sereno, California =

City in California, United States

- City
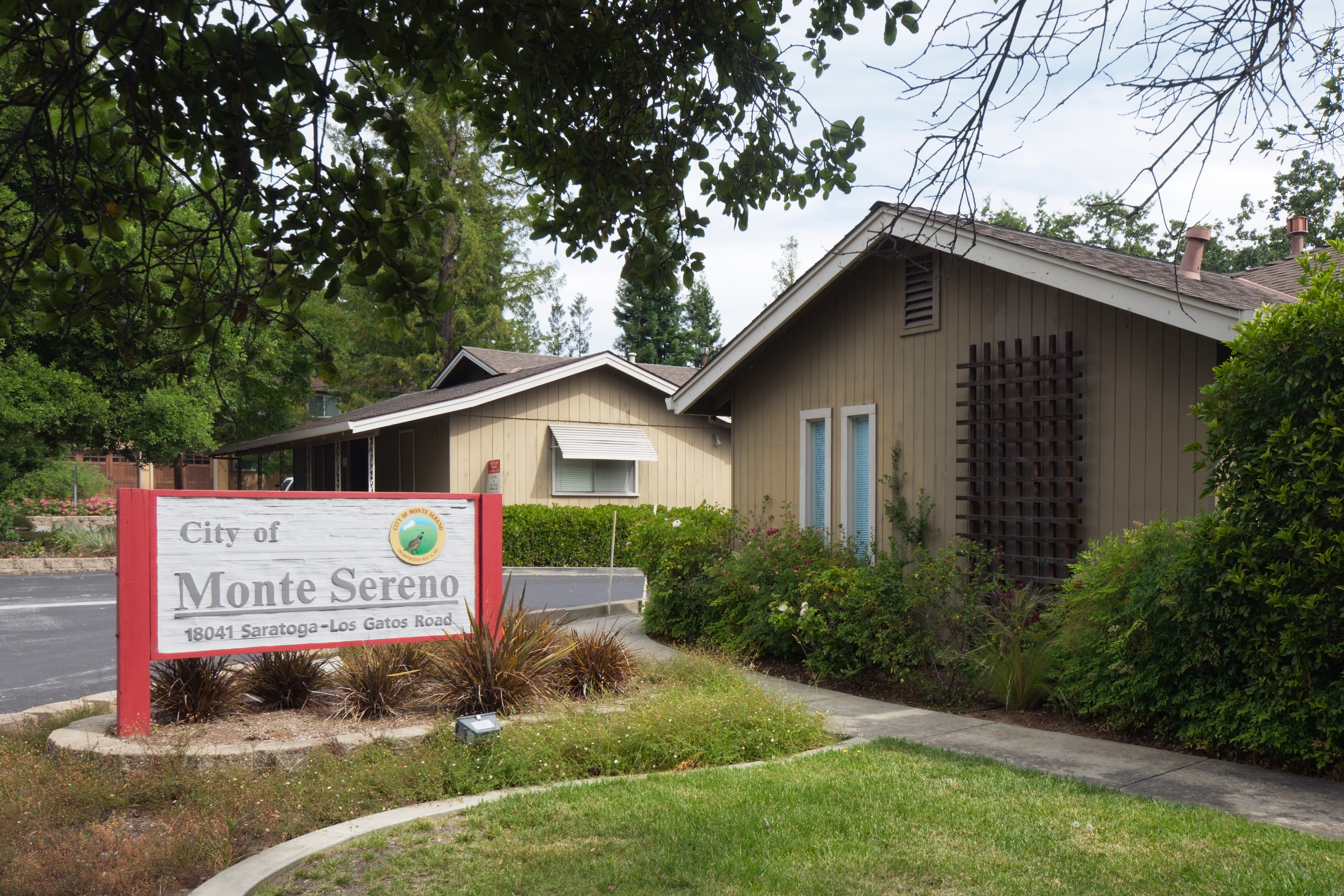
- Post Office and City Hall in Monte Sereno

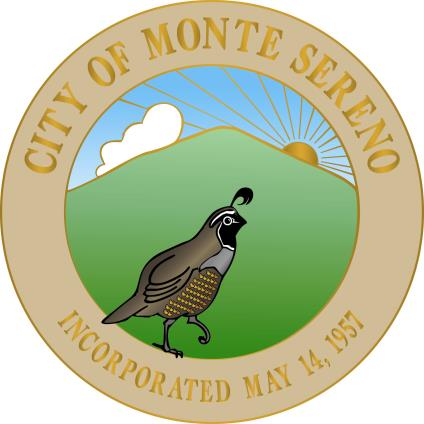
- Seal
- Interactive map of Monte Sereno, California
- Location in the United States
- Coordinates: 37°14′17″N 121°59′22″W
- Country: United States
- State: California
- County: Santa Clara
- Incorporated: May 14, 1957

Government
  - Mayor: Lon Allan

Area
  - Total: 1.63 sq mi (4.23 km^{2})
  - Land: 1.63 sq mi (4.23 km^{2})
  - Water: 0 sq mi (0.00 km^{2}) 0%
- Elevation: 515 ft (157 m)

Population (2020)
  - Total: 3,479
  - Density: 2,130/sq mi (822/km^{2})
- Time zone: UTC-8 (PST)
  - Summer (DST): UTC−7 (PDT)
- ZIP code: 95030
- Area codes: 408/669
- FIPS code: 06-48956
- GNIS feature ID: 277610
- Website: https://www.montesereno.org

Monte Sereno (Spanish for "Serene Mountain") is a city in Santa Clara County, California, United States. The population was 3,479 at the 2020 census. The city is located in the foothills of the Santa Cruz Mountains, about 10 miles (16 km) southwest of San Jose, and is bordered by the town of Los Gatos to the north, east, and south, the Santa Cruz Mountains to the southwest, and the city of Saratoga to the northwest. The city is named for the 2,580-foot (790 m) El Sereno Mountain, upon the slopes of which the southern portion of the city is built. The community is entirely residential with no commercial zoning and 99% single-family housing. It is an upscale Silicon Valley commuter town. Monte Sereno shares the Zip code 95030 with the town of Los Gatos. Many municipal services are provided under contract by Los Gatos.

== History ==
The Monte Sereno area was part of the 1839 Alta California land grant of Rancho Rinconada de Los Gatos. The city incorporated on May 14, 1957, to protect its semi-rural atmosphere. Its first Mayor was Retired Vice Admiral and former Director of Naval Intelligence, Thomas B. Inglis.

John Steinbeck wrote The Grapes of Wrath and Of Mice and Men in a wooded home at 16250 Greenwood Lane in what is now Monte Sereno.

Beat Generation figure Neal Cassady lived in a Monte Sereno ranch house in the 1950s. Painter Thomas Kinkade lived in Monte Sereno in the later years of his life until his death.

== Geography ==
According to the United States Census Bureau, the city has a total area of 1.6 square miles (4.1 km^{2}), all land. San Tomas Aquino Creek forms its western border. Saratoga-Los Gatos Road (State Route 9) passes through the city.

The El Sereno Open Space Preserve is immediately south of the city and covers the top and portions of the flanks of El Sereno mountain.

== Demographics ==
Historical population
| Census | Pop. | Note | %± |
|---|---|---|---|
| 1960 | 1,506 | | — |
| 1970 | 2,847 | | 89.0% |
| 1980 | 3,434 | | 20.6% |
| 1990 | 3,287 | | −4.3% |
| 2000 | 3,483 | | 6.0% |
| 2010 | 3,341 | | −4.1% |
| 2020 | 3,479 | | 4.1% |
U.S. Decennial Census

=== 2020 census ===
As of the 2020 census, Monte Sereno had a population of 3,479. The population density was 2,100 people per square mile (810.81/km^{2}). The median age was 51.2 years. 20.2% of residents were under the age of 18 and 24.3% of residents were 65 years of age or older. For every 100 females there were 98.0 males, and for every 100 females age 18 and over there were 96.1 males age 18 and over.

100.0% of residents lived in urban areas, while 0.0% lived in rural areas.

There were 1,223 households in Monte Sereno, of which 35.6% had children under the age of 18 living in them. Of all households, 76.6% were married-couple households, 9.2% were households with a male householder and no spouse or partner present, and 12.0% were households with a female householder and no spouse or partner present. About 12.4% of all households were made up of individuals and 7.6% had someone living alone who was 65 years of age or older.

There were 1,300 housing units, of which 5.9% were vacant. The homeowner vacancy rate was 0.2% and the rental vacancy rate was 2.3%.

Racial composition as of the 2020 census
| Race | Number | Percent |
|---|---|---|
| White | 2,354 | 67.7% |
| Black or African American | 26 | 0.7% |
| American Indian and Alaska Native | 9 | 0.3% |
| Asian | 682 | 19.6% |
| Native Hawaiian and Other Pacific Islander | 3 | 0.1% |
| Some other race | 44 | 1.3% |
| Two or more races | 361 | 10.4% |
| Hispanic or Latino (of any race) | 230 | 6.6% |

=== 2010 census ===
The 2010 United States census reported that Monte Sereno had a population of 3,341. The population density was 2,068.4 inhabitants per square mile (798.6/km^{2}). The racial makeup of Monte Sereno was 2,698 (80.8%) White, 14 (0.4%) African American, 12 (0.4%) Native American, 464 (13.9%) Asian, 0 (0.0%) Pacific Islander, 28 (0.8%) from other races, and 125 (3.7%) from two or more races. Hispanic or Latino of any race were 162 persons (4.8%).

The Census reported that 100% of the population lived in households.

There were 1,211 households, out of which 433 (35.8%) had children under the age of 18 living in them, 917 (75.7%) were opposite-sex married couples living together, 59 (4.9%) had a female householder with no husband present, 26 (2.1%) had a male householder with no wife present. There were 14 (1.2%) unmarried opposite-sex partnerships, and 8 (0.7%) same-sex married couples or partnerships. 178 households (14.7%) were made up of individuals, and 87 (7.2%) had someone living alone who was 65 years of age or older. The average household size was 2.76. There were 1,002 families (82.7% of all households); the average family size was 3.05.

The population was spread out, with 816 people (24.4%) under the age of 18, 156 people (4.7%) aged 18 to 24, 487 people (14.6%) aged 25 to 44, 1,235 people (37.0%) aged 45 to 64, and 647 people (19.4%) who were 65 years of age or older. The median age was 48.3 years. For every 100 females, there were 96.3 males. For every 100 females age 18 and over, there were 94.2 males.

There were 1,287 housing units at an average density of 796.8 per square mile (307.6/km^{2}), of which 1,090 (90.0%) were owner-occupied, and 121 (10.0%) were occupied by renters. The homeowner vacancy rate was 1.3%; the rental vacancy rate was 5.4%. 3,030 people (90.7% of the population) lived in owner-occupied housing units and 311 people (9.3%) lived in rental housing units.

=== 2000 census ===
As of the 2000 census, there were 3,483 people, 1,211 households, and 1,024 families residing in the city. The population density was 2,158.7 inhabitants per square mile (833.5/km^{2}). There were 1,237 housing units at an average density of 766.7 per square mile (296.0/km^{2}). The racial makeup of the city was 83.61% White, 0.17% African American, 0.06% Native American, 12.29% Asian, 0.03% Pacific Islander, 1.06% from other races, and 2.78% from two or more races. Hispanic or Latino of any race were 3.59% of the population. In the city 604 people are foreign born, 6.7% from Asia, 3% from Europe, and 2.7% from other North American countries.

There were 1,211 households, out of which 39.1% had children under the age of 18 living with them, 78.0% were married couples living together, 4.0% had a female householder with no husband present, and 15.4% were non-families. 12.6% of all households were made up of individuals, and 5.9% had someone living alone who was 65 years of age or older. The average household size was 2.88 and the average family size was 3.13.

In the city, the population was spread out, with 27.8% under the age of 18, 3.7% from 18 to 24, 21.8% from 25 to 44, 32.2% from 45 to 64, and 14.5% who were 65 years of age or older. The median age was 43 years. For every 100 females, there were 99.9 males. For every 100 females age 18 and over, there were 96.6 males.

=== Income and poverty ===
The median income for a household in the city was $154,268, and the median income for a family was $156,706. The unemployment rate in 2015 was 3.7%. Males had a median income of $100,000+ versus $41,875 for females. The per capita income for the city was $76,577. About 3.1% of families and 4.2% of the population were below the poverty line, including 3.9% of those under age 18 and 4.8% of those age 65 or over.

== Politics ==
Of Monte Sereno's 2,687 registered voters, 43% are registered Democrats while 26% are registered Republicans, according to a January 2022 report by the California Secretary of State.

In the state legislature, Monte Sereno is in the 13th senatorial district, represented by Democrat Josh Becker, and in the 28th Assembly district, represented by Democrat Gail Pellerin.

Federally, Monte Sereno is in California's 16th congressional district, represented by Democrat Sam Liccardo.

Monte Sereno is also served by District 5 county supervisor Margaret Abe-Koga.

== Schools ==
Most of Monte Sereno's residents are served by the Los Gatos Union Elementary School or Saratoga Elementary School districts (for elementary and middle schools) and Los Gatos-Saratoga Union High School Districts (for high school). A small portion of residents, primarily in the Bicknell Road area, are served by the Campbell Union School and the Campbell Union High School districts.

== Public services ==
Public services for Monte Sereno are served by those of the town of Los Gatos. These include the Los Gatos-Monte Sereno Police Department, the Los Gatos Parks and Recreation Department, and Los Gatos youth sports leagues.

== Government ==
Monte Sereno is a General Law City incorporated on May 14, 1957. It operates under the City Council-City Manager form of local government, which combines the political leadership of a five-member elected City Council with the strong professional experience of an appointed local government administrator (City Manager) who is responsible for the day-to-day administrative operation of the city, including preparation of the budget, delivery of services, hiring of personnel, and implementation of capital projects.

City Council elections are held the first Tuesday of November in even-numbered years. The election is nonpartisan, and the councilmembers are elected "at large" to serve the entire community rather than by district. The councilmembers are elected to four-year terms. In 1998, voters approved an ordinance limiting the number of terms a member of the Monte Sereno City Council may serve on the City Council to two consecutive four-year terms with a right to hold office again only after at least two years have elapsed since that person last held office.

In 2004, the City Council voted to cancel the election because only the two incumbents whose terms were up, Erin Garner and David Baxter, filed candidacy papers to run for the two available seats. However, in 2008, the City Council voted to hold the election for the two available seats despite there being only two candidates, Lana Malloy and Susan Garner.

| Year | Mayor | All Council Members |
|---|---|---|
| 2023 | Bryan Mekechuk | Bryan Mekechuk, Rowena Turner, Burton Craig, Javed Ellahie, Evert Wolsheimer (1) |
| 2022 | Javed Ellahie | Shawn Leuthold, Javed Ellahie, Rowena Turner, Bryan Mekechuk |
| 2021 | Shawn Leuthold | Shawn Leuthold, Javed Ellahie, Rowena Turner, Bryan Mekechuk |
| 2020 | Liz Lawler | Liz Lawler, Shawn Leuthold, Javed Ellahie, Daniel LaBouve(2), Rowena Turner |
| 2019 | Curtis Rogers(3) Rowena Turner | Rowena Turner, Liz Lawler, Shawn Leuthold, Javed Ellahie, Curtis Rogers-->Daniel LaBouve(4) |
| 2018 | Burton Craig | Burton Craig, Evert Wolsheimer, Marshall Anstandig, Curtis Rogers, Rowena Turner |
| 2017 | Marshall Anstandig | Marshall Anstandig, Burton Craig, Evert Wolsheimer, Curtis Rogers, Rowena Turner |
| 2016 | Lon Allan | Lon Allan, Marshall Anstandig, Burton Craig, Evert Wolsheimer |
| 2015 | Walter Huff | Lon Allan, Marshall Anstandig, Burton Craig, Sue Garner-->Evert Wolsheimer(5) |
| 2014 | Burton Craig | Marshall Anstandig, Walter Huff, Curtis Rogers, Lon Allan(6) |
| 2013 | Curtis Rogers | Marshall Anstandig, Burton Craig, Walter Huff, Julie Wiltshire(7) |
| 2012 | Susan Garner | Marshall Anstandig, Burton Craig, Lana Malloy, Susan Garner, Curtis Rogers |
| 2011 | Marshall Anstandig | Marshall Anstandig, Burton Craig, Lana Malloy, Susan Garner, Curtis Rogers |
| 2010 | Don Perry | Marshall Anstandig, Lana Malloy, Susan Garner, Don Perry, A. Curtis Wright |
| 2009 | A. Curtis Wright | Marshall Anstandig, Lana Malloy, Susan Garner, Don Perry, A. Curtis Wright |
| 2008 | Erin Garner | Alan Aerts-->Marshall Anstandig(8), David Baxter, Erin Garner, Don Perry, A. Curtis Wright |
| 2007 | David Baxter | Alan Aerts, David Baxter, Erin Garner, Don Perry, A. Curtis Wright |
| 2006 | Mark Brodsky | David Baxter, Mark Brodsky, Erin Garner, Barbara Nesbet, A. Curtis Wright |
| 2005 | A. Curtis Wright | David Baxter, Mark Brodsky, Erin Garner, Barbara Nesbet, A. Curtis Wright |
| 2004 | Erin Garner | David Baxter, Mark Brodsky, Erin Garner, Barbara Nesbet, A. Curtis Wright |
| 2003 | David Baxter | David Baxter, Mark Brodsky, Erin Garner, Barbara Nesbet, A. Curtis Wright |
| 2002 | Jack Lucas | David Baxter, Erin Garner, Suzanne Jackson, Jack Lucas, Barbara Nesbet |
| 2001 | Barbara Nesbet | David Baxter, Erin Garner, Suzanne Jackson, Jack Lucas, Barbara Nesbet |
| 2000 | Suzanne Jackson | Fred Hawkes(9), Suzanne Jackson, Gordon Knight, Lucas, Barbara Nesbet |
| 1999 | Jack Lucas | Joel Gambord, Suzanne Jackson, Gordon Knight, Lucas, Barbara Nesbet |
| 1998 | Suzanne Jackson | Dorothea Bamford, Joel Gambord, Gordon Knight, Jack Lucas, Suzanne Jackson |
| 1997 | Jack Lucas | Dorothea Bamford, Joel Gambord, Gordon Knight, Jack Lucas, Suzanne Jackson |
| 1996 | Nancy Hobbs | Dorothea Bamford, Nancy Hobbs, Suzanne Jackson, Jack Lucas |
| 1995 | | Dorothea Bamford, Nancy Hobbs, Suzanne Jackson, Jack Lucas |
| 1994 | | Dorothea Bamford, Nancy Hobbs, Jack Lucas |
| 1993 | | Dorothea Bamford, Nancy Hobbs, Jack Lucas |
| 1992 | | Dorothea Bamford, Jack Lucas, Barbara Winckler |
| 1991 | | Dorothea Bamford, Jack Lucas, Barbara Winckler |
| 1990 | | Dorothea Bamford, Jack Lucas, Barbara Winckler |
| 1989 | | Dorothea Bamford, Jack Lucas, Barbara Winckler |
| 1988 | | Dorothea Bamford, Jack Lucas, Barbara Winckler |
| 1987 | | Dorothea Bamford, Jack Lucas, Barbara Winckler |
| 1986 | | Dorothea Bamford, Jack Lucas, Barbara Winckler |
| 1985 | | Dorothea Bamford, Jack Lucas, Barbara Winckler |
| 1984 | | Dorothea Bamford, Jack Lucas, Barbara Winckler |
| 1983 | | Dorothea Bamford, Barbara Winckler |

(1) Javed Ellahie, Burton Craig, and Evert Wolsheimer were appointed to the council rather than holding an election in November 2022 because they were the only three residents who submitted candidacy forms for the three open council seats. (2) Council Member LaBouve resigned on September 1, 2020.
(3) On March 5, 2019, Council Members Turner, Leuthold and Lawler voted to strip Mayor Rogers of his title of Mayor and elevate Vice Mayor Turner to Mayor and make Council Member Lawler the Vice Mayor.
(4) Daniel LaBouve was appointed on May 7, 2019, to fill Curtis Rogers' seat after Mr. Rogers resigned on March 5, 2019.
(5) Evert Wolsheimer was appointed on November 3, 2015, to fill Susan Garner's seat.
(6) Lon Allan was appointed January 21, 2014, to fill Julie Wiltshire's seat.
(7) Julie Wiltshire resigned in December 2013 when she moved out of the city.
(8) Marshall Anstandig was appointed November 18, 2008, to fill Alan Aerts' seat after Mr. Aerts resigned on October 21, 2008, for health reasons.
(9) Appointed April 13, 2000, to fill Joel Gambord's seat when Mr. Gambord moved out of the city.

== Notable events ==
=== Christmas decorations ===
A dispute between two neighbors over extravagant Christmas decorations gained Monte Sereno attention in national news. For years, Bonnie and Alan Aerts of Monte Sereno had showcased elaborate holiday displays in their front yard, costing as much as US$150,000. The displays attracted large masses of visitors, resulting in great traffic around the normally quiet cul-de-sac of four houses. Neighbors Le and Susan Nguyen protested, and, in late 2003, the city council voted 3-2 (Nesbet, Brodsky, Wright for; Garner, Baxter against) to pass an ordinance regarding "regulation of special events," which would require permits for such displays. In 2004, on the first Christmas season for which the law was effective, the Aertses declined to apply for a permit, which would allow the Aertses' holiday display to be active only for 12 hours in a 72-hour period and would require a 30-day waiting period before a new 72-hour permit could be applied for. Instead, they erected a huge, 10-foot-tall Grinch on their lawn, who swayed from side while singing "You're a Mean One, Mr. Grinch". The Grinch's outstretched arm pointed conspicuously at the home of the Nguyens.

The spectacle gained mention from the Associated Press and NPR. The Aertses and the Nguyens also appeared on Jimmy Kimmel Live!, a late night talk show.

=== City in Turmoil in 2019 ===
In February 2019, newly elected Council Member Shawn Leuthold successfully led an effort to change how Monte Sereno would select its mayor in the future, arguing that the city was violating the law in election years by choosing the Mayor for the next year, prior to the seating of the newly elected council members. In March 2019, the Council went a step further and removed Mayor Curtis Rogers from his position as mayor, and then appointed the then-current Vice Mayor Rowena Turner as Mayor with Council Member Liz Lawler being appointed as Vice Mayor (with Council Members Turner, Lawler, and Leuthold voting for the changes and Council Members Javed Ellahie and Rogers voting against). Upon being removed as Mayor, Council Member Rogers resigned. The Council appointed Daniel LaBouve to fill the vacancy. During the course of the remainder of the year, most of the City staff resigned, including the finance officer, city attorney, building official, city manager, and city clerk. The City staff also decided to unionize for the first time in Monte Sereno's 60-year history.

== Notable people ==
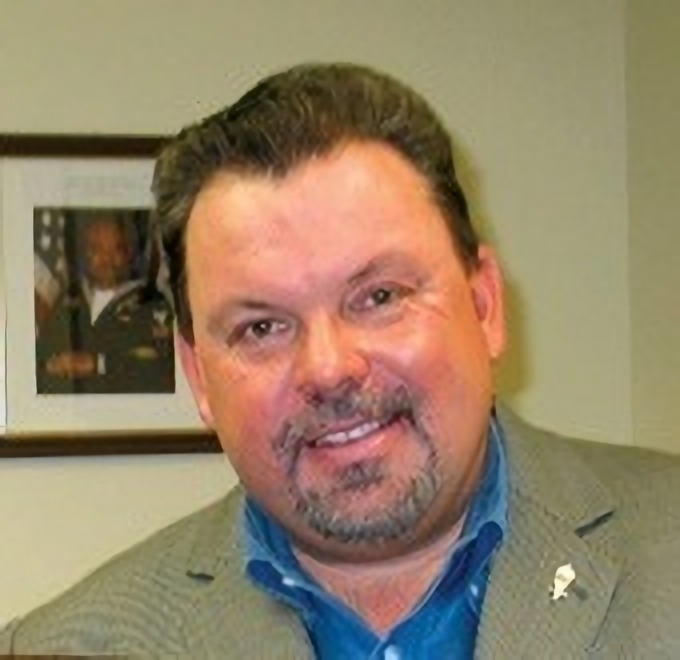
Thomas Kinkade, American painter of popular realistic, pastoral, and idyllic subjects.

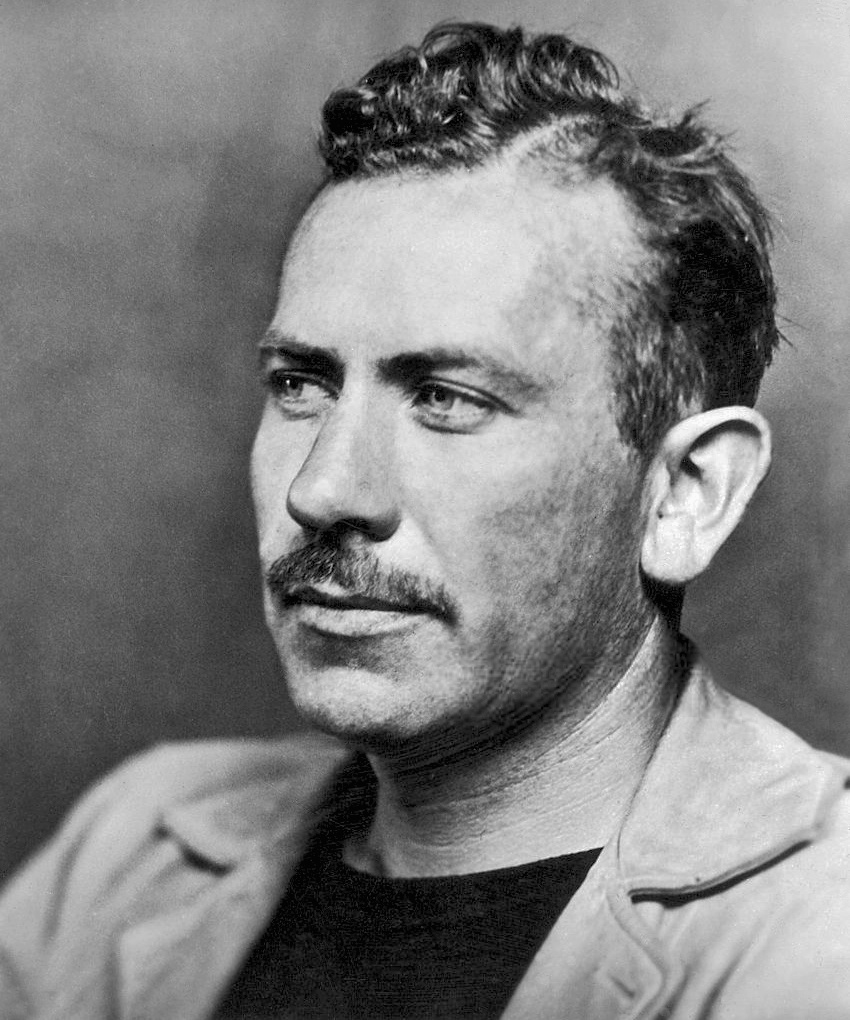
John Steinbeck, Nobel Prize-winning author wrote The Grapes of Wrath and finished Of Mice and Men while living in Monte Sereno.

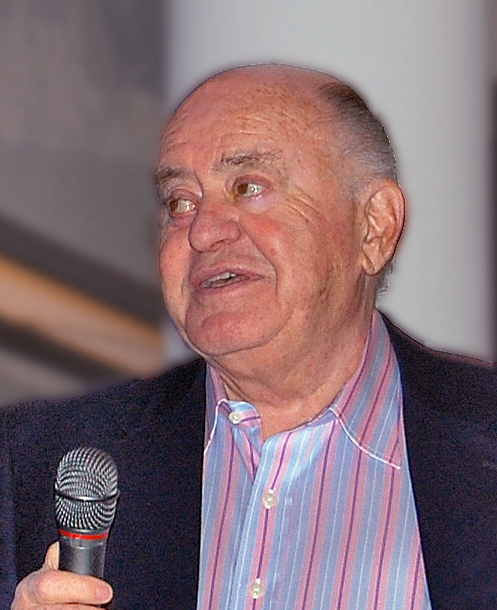
Jack Tramiel, Polish American businessman and Holocaust survivor, best known for founding Commodore International. The Commodore PET, VIC-20, and Commodore 64 are some home computers produced while he was running the company.

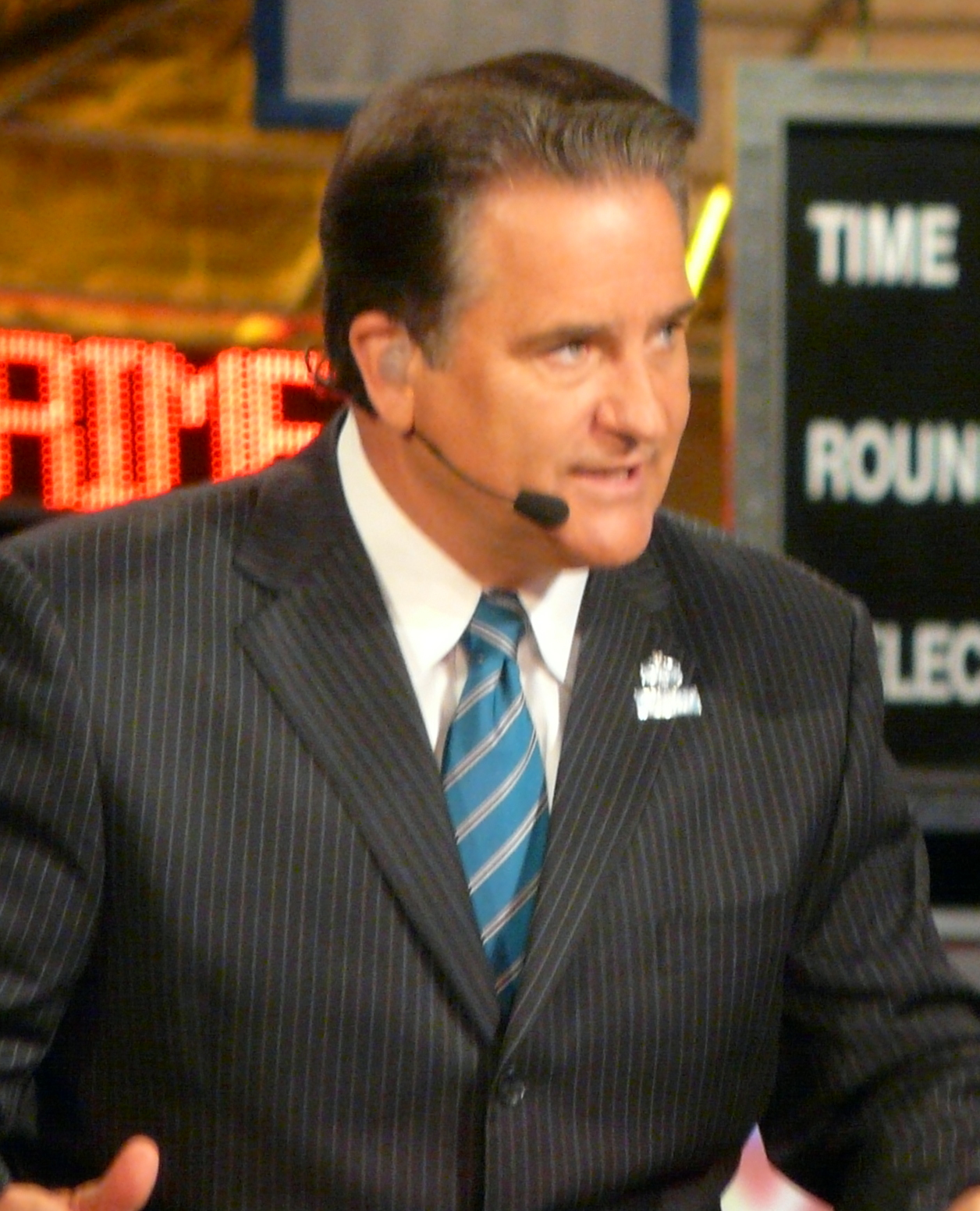
Steve Mariucci, Former NFL Coach and current NFL Network Analyst.
