= Alan Aerts =

World powerlifting and benchpress champion (born 1956)

Alan Aerts was a world powerlifting and benchpress champion. Born May 6, 1956, he died unexpectedly on August 23, 2023. Aerts had polycythemia, a fatal blood disease; however, this was not his cause of death. He was also the former owner and operator of the largest vending machine business in the San Jose, California area, Custom Vending Systems. Aerts served on the city council of Monte Sereno, California.

== Powerlifting and bench press ==
In 2009 Alan achieved the men's benchpress world record in the 140 kg weight class for men 50 and over, at 202.5 kg (446 lb). Aerts held numerous powerlifting and benchpress championships and records in both open and master's competitions, including California, US, and World champion.

Alan Aerts served as a California state powerlifting referee. He also served as the World Powerlifting Federation records chairman.

On December 30, 2016, Aerts was inducted into the US Powerlifting Association's Hall of Fame.

His wife, Bonnie Aerts, is also a powerlifting and benchpress champion and bodybuilder, holding the United States Powerlifting Federation bench press record in her weight class in 2006. Bonnie Aerts was inducted into the US Powerlifting Association's Hall of Fame in 2022. Alan Aerts presented his wife with the award.

== Polycythemia ==
Aerts had a rare blood disease called polycythemia, which causes the body to produce excess red blood cells. Although the disease can be treated for a time, this disease is fatal in most cases. Despite this condition, Aerts continued to compete in powerlifting and bench press competitions, and became world champion in his weight class after being diagnosed with the disease.

== Public citizen ==
Aerts was prominent in Monte Sereno, California where he resided in the 1990s and early 2000s. In 2006 he was awarded "Citizen of the Year" by the city of Campbell, California. He ran for Monte Sereno City Council 2006, and was a commissioner (?-2006) and a city councilman (2007, 2008) for the City of Monte Sereno, California. He was also a philanthropist, and donated significant money and time to charities including Guide Dogs for the Blind, Special Olympics, and other local charities.

His business, "Custom Vending Systems," was named "Business of the Year" by the city of Campbell, California in 2005, and was the leading vending machine business in Silicon Valley. In 2013, Aerts retired from vending, sold his business, and moved to Nevada.

After years of creating elaborate Christmas season displays (including cookies and punch for visiting children) at his home, with decorations costing in excess of $150,000 and drawing tens of thousands of visitors, Aerts became the target of neighborhood controversy over the traffic, parking, and other disruption to the neighborhood resulting from all the attention to the displays. Aerts attempted to alleviate concerns by hiring private security to help with traffic management on the four-home court where he lived.

Local residents signed a petition, and the city council voted in an ordinance, often referred to as the "Alan Aerts" ordinance, that prevented the popular display starting in 2003. In protest, the Aerts' raised a statue of The Grinch, which garnered the event attention and coverage in media including The Associated Press, The New York Times, The Daily Show on Comedy Central, MSNBC, Jimmy Kimmel Live!, National Public Radio (NPR), and local newspapers and television shows.
