= Sheriff William Joseph Nesbitt House =

Historic house in California, United States

- U.S. National Register of Historic Places
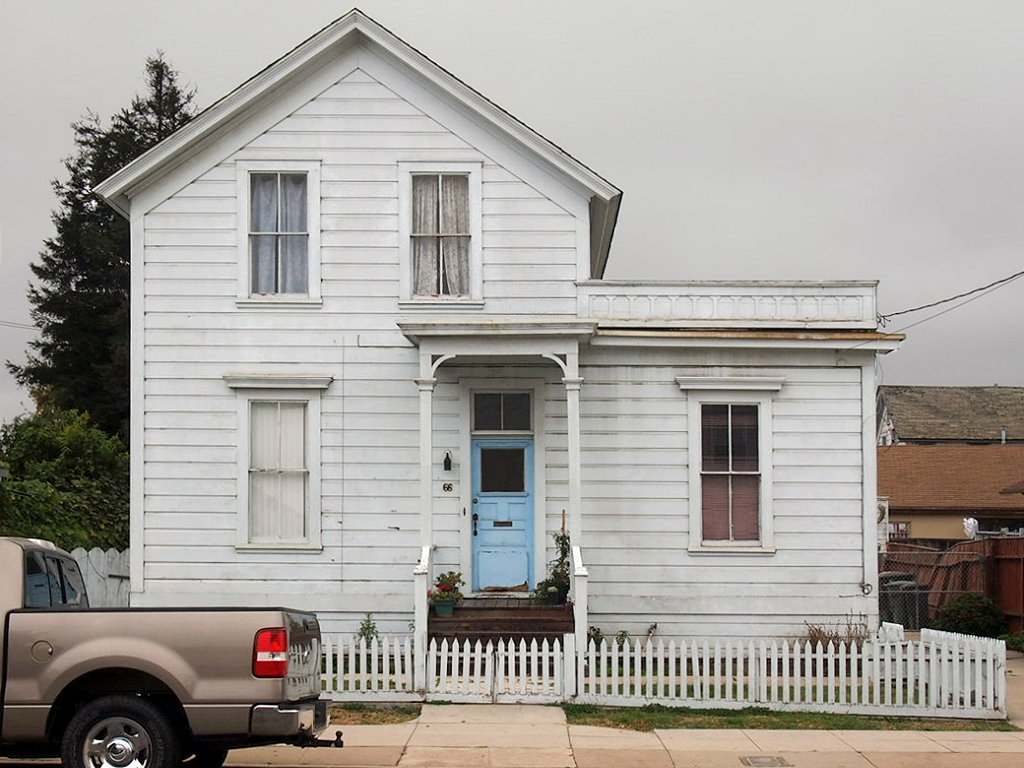
- Sheriff William Joseph Nesbitt House

- Location of Nesbitt House in California.
- Location: 66 Capitol St., Salinas, California
- Coordinates: 36°40′36″N 121°39′38″W
- Area: less than one acre
- Built: 1896
- Architectural style: vernacular
- NRHP reference No.: 82002210
- Added to NRHP: February 19, 1982

The Sheriff William Joseph Nesbitt House is a historic vernacular style house located at 66 Capitol Street, Salinas, California. The house was listed on the National Register of Historic Places on February 19, 1982.

== History ==
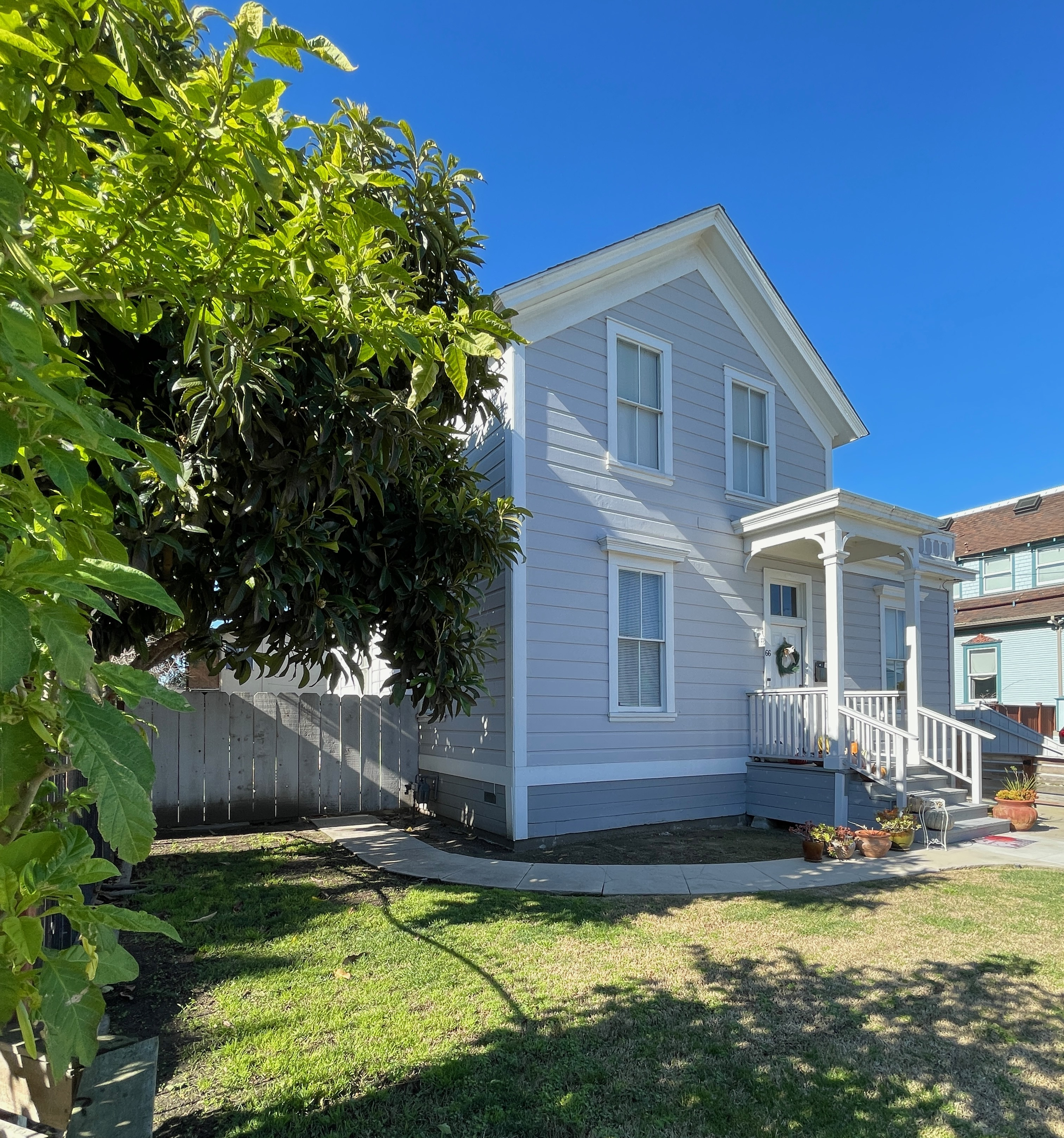
Side view of Sheriff William Joseph Nesbitt House

The Nesbitt house is a two-story, wood-frame building, with a single-story north wing. It has a foundation of railroad ties and a redwood siding with a pitch gable roof covered with composition shingles.

The Nesbitt house was deemed significant as a rare surviving example of the vernacular houses common to the 19th-century settlement of California. It was the home of Sheriff William Joseph Nesbitt and Frances Camilla Dunham who lived in the house from 1881 to 1933. Nesbitt was a notable Sheriff who did police work in Salinas for over 40 years.

John Steinbeck was born two blocks east of the Nesbitt's house, at the John Steinbeck House located at 132 Central Avenue.

== William Joseph Nesbitt ==
William Joseph Nesbitt (1853–1933) was born on April 21, 1853, in Fayette County, Illinois. He was an orphan and raised by an aunt and uncle. He left home at age 13 and found employment as a laborer on a farm. He moved to California in 1871 where he was a rancher for seven years. He did sheep-raising, stock buying, and shipping in southern Monterey County.

In 1878, Nesbitt worked as special deputy to County Sheriff C. Franks. He was elected to the office of town Marshall in Salinas in 1882. He married Frances Camilla Dunham on September 16, 1881, in Salinas and moved to the house on 66 Capitol Street. They had four children together.

Nesbitt became constable of Alisal Township from 1884 to 1887. He then joined Sheriff John L. Matthews as deputy for six years. He was elected for the second time as Salinas town Marshall. In 1902, he was elected county sheriff and was sworn in on January 1, 1903. He remained in office as sheriff until his retirement from active service in 1923.

In 1916, Nesbitt worked on a case that got national attention, about Helen Wood Smith, a Carmel-by-the-Sea artist. Nesbitt helped solve the murder of Smith by George Bodoni, a Japanese artist photographer, who was arrested for Smith's strangulation.

Nesbitt died of a heart attack at his home on January 25, 1933, at the age of 80. He is buried near his four sons in the Garden of Memories Memorial Park on 850 Abbott St, Salinas.

== See also ==
- National Register of Historic Places listings in Monterey County, California
