= El Sereno Open Space Preserve =

Coordinates: 37°13′10″N 122°01′26″W

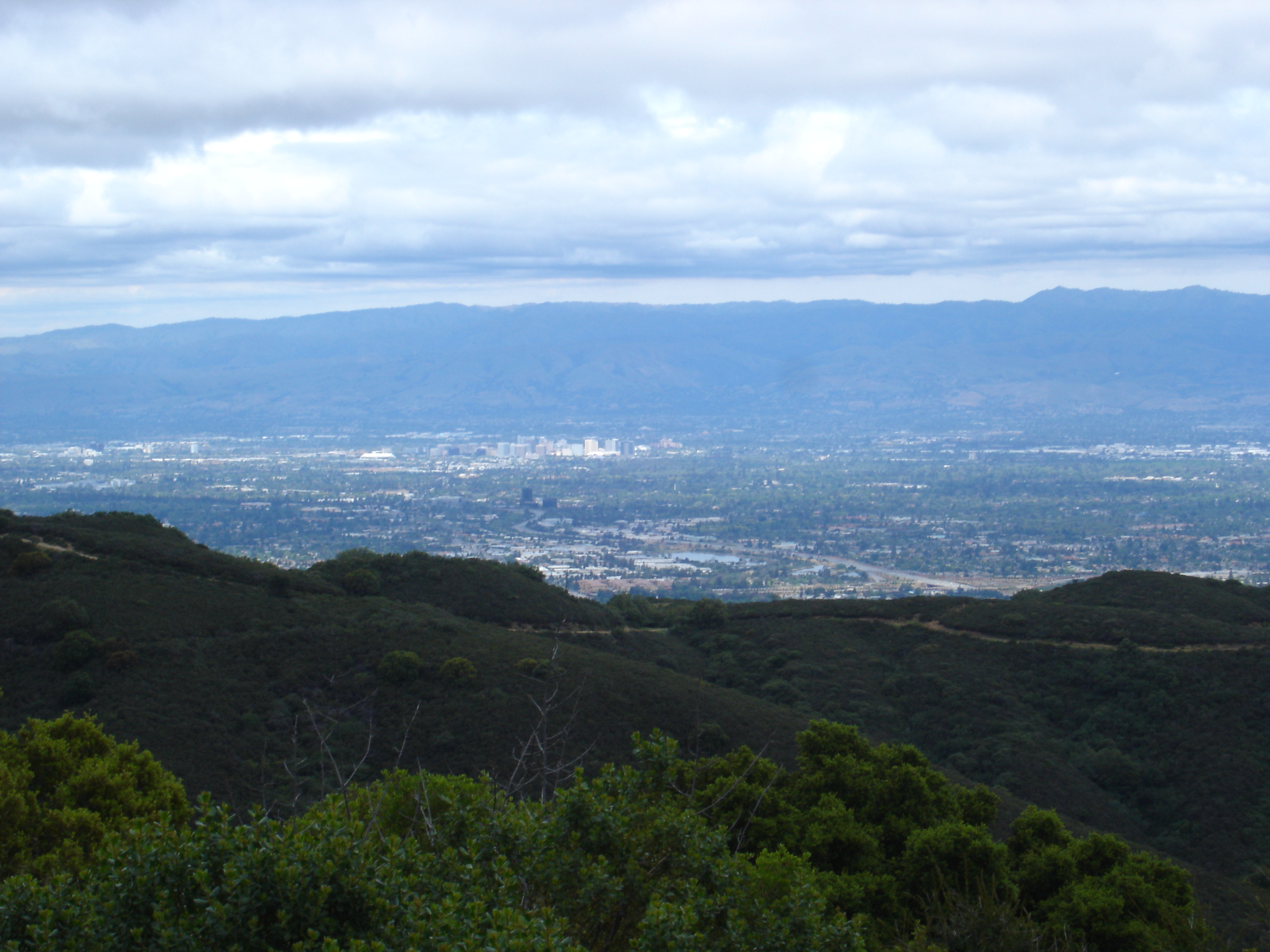
Campbell and San Jose from the El Sereno Open Space Preserve.

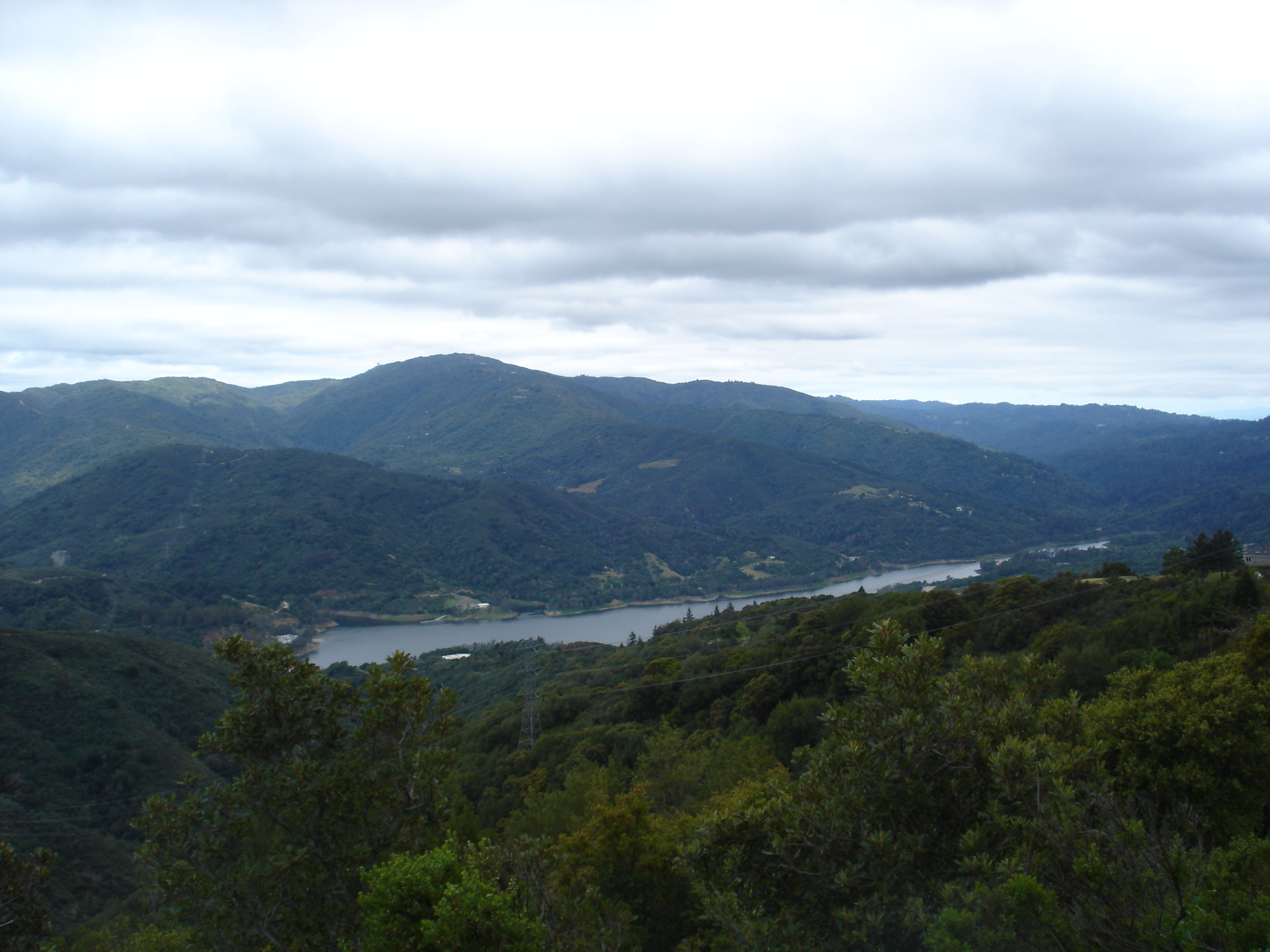
Lexington Reservoir from the preserve

El Sereno Open Space Preserve is a park unit of the Midpeninsula Regional Open Space District located on the peak and slopes of 2580 ft. El Sereno mountain, a peak in the Santa Cruz Mountains. The preserve is located in Santa Clara County, California.

== Location ==
The city of Monte Sereno, California is named after El Sereno mountain. A portion of the city is built on the foothills of the mountain. El Sereno mountain is paired with El Sombroso mountain on each side of Los Gatos, California.

== Geology ==
The San Andreas Fault runs in the valley immediately to the south of the mountain. The Berrocal fault zone runs under the mountain's northern slope. A small, unnamed fault runs in the small valley that leads down to Canon Dr. The northern slope forms the headwaters of San Tomas Aquino Creek.

== Views ==
The preserve offers visitors views of Silicon Valley, Los Gatos, California and Lexington Reservoir. The Monterey peninsula can be seen in the distance.

== Trails ==
Limited parking is available at the end of Montevina Rd. The Montevina Ridge Trail from there connects to both Bolhman Road and the Aquinas Trail. Aquinas Trail goes from the Montevina Ridge Trail to Sheldon Road, the Serenity Trail and the Loma Vista Trail. The Serenity Trail goes to the base of a power pole overlooking Lexington Reservoir. The Loma Vista Trail goes to Overlook Drive. The Overlook Trail connects nearby from one spot on Overlook Drive to another spot on Overlook Drive, and permit parking is available on the westernmost of these spots.

== Cougar habitat ==
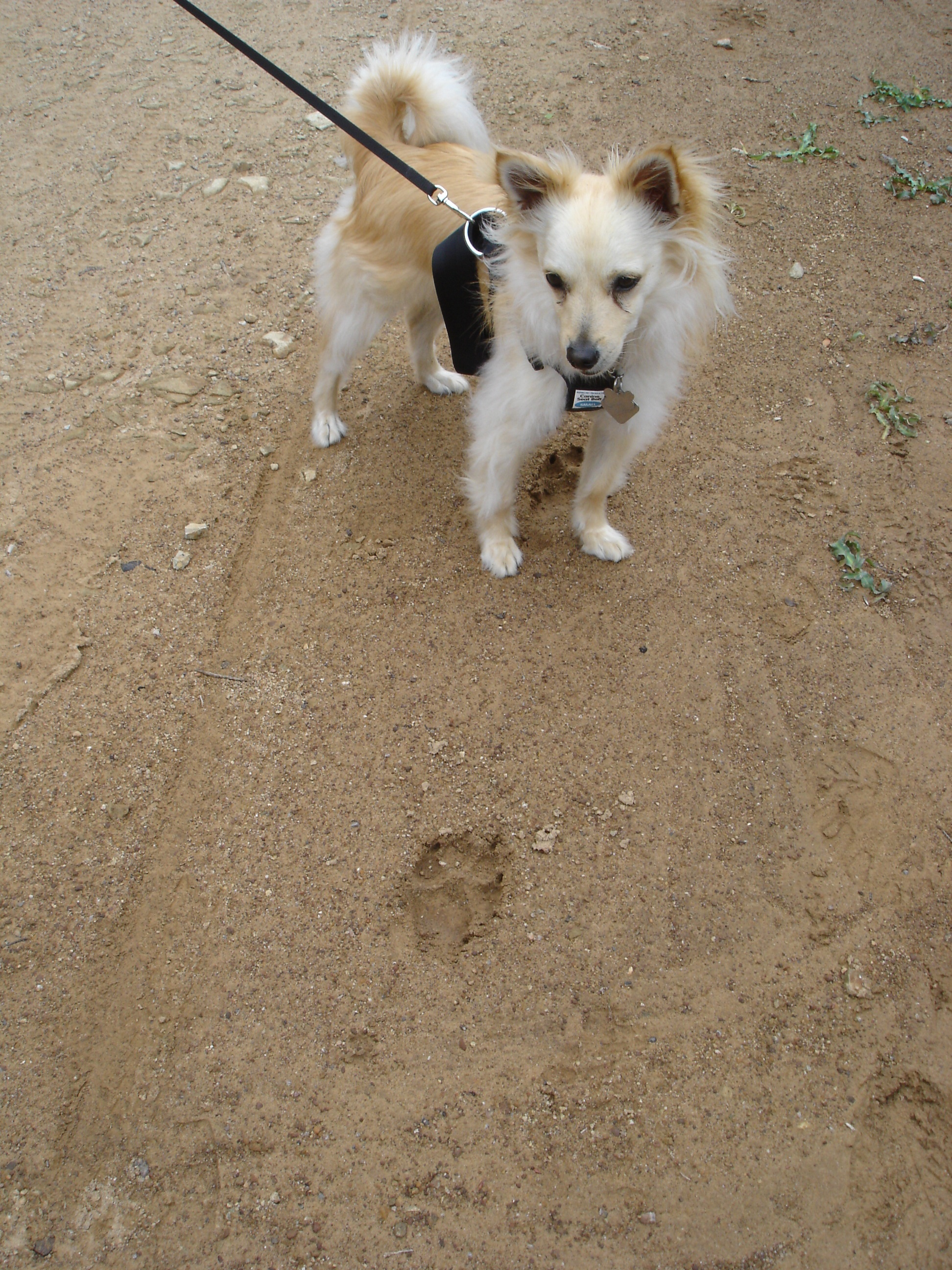
Cougar track in the preserve

El Sereno mountain is a habitat for the Cougar. Signs at the entrance to the preserve warn visitors.
