= John Steinbeck House (Monte Sereno, California) =

Historic house in California, United States

- U.S. National Register of Historic Places
- U.S. Historic district
- Location within San Jose, California Location within California Location within the United States
- Location: 16250 Greenwood Ln., Monte Sereno, California
- Coordinates: 37°13′57″N 121°59′55″W
- Area: 1.6 acres (0.65 ha)
- Built by: Lawrence Case
- Architectural style: Modern Movement, Ranch Style
- NRHP reference No.: 89002117
- Added to NRHP: December 28, 1989

The John Steinbeck House at 16250 Greenwood Lane in Monte Sereno, California, was the home of author John Steinbeck from 1936 to 1938. The house was built in 1936, in the foothills of the Santa Cruz Mountains in what was then part of the town of Los Gatos, California, for Steinbeck and his wife, Carol. While living in the house, Steinbeck wrote The Grapes of Wrath and completed Of Mice and Men. The Steinbecks added a guest house to the property after the house's completion; renowned actors, literary agents, and friends of the Steinbecks stayed in the guest house while visiting the couple. In 1938, the Steinbecks left the house, as they felt that its location was no longer as secluded as it had been two years earlier.

The John Steinbeck House was added to the National Register of Historic Places on December 28, 1989. Unlike Steinbeck's birthplace in Salinas, California, this house is now a private residence and is closed to the public.

== See also ==
- John Steinbeck House (Salinas, California), another Steinbeck residence on the NRHP
