= John Steinbeck House (Salinas, California) =

Historic house in California, United States

- U.S. National Register of Historic Places
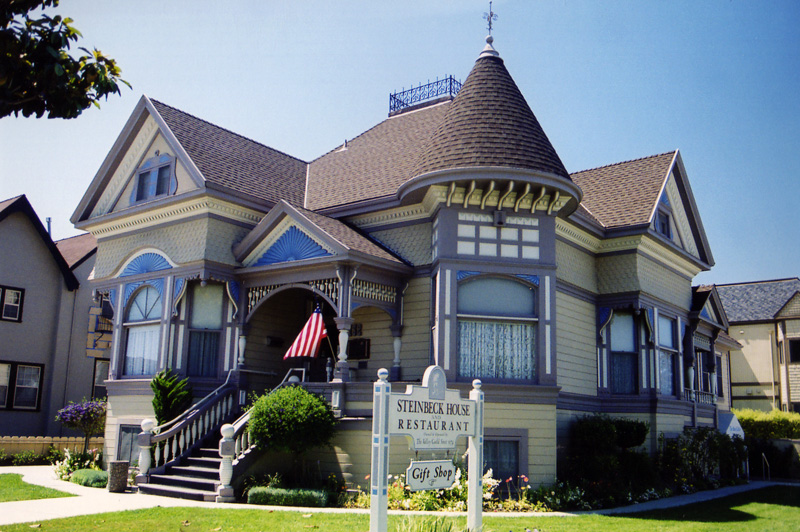

- Location of John Steinbeck House in California.
- Location: 132 Central Ave., Salinas, California
- Coordinates: 36°40′36″N 121°39′29″W
- Area: less than one acre
- Built: 1897
- Architectural style: Queen Anne
- NRHP reference No.: 00000856
- Added to NRHP: August 8, 2000

The John Steinbeck House is a historic house restaurant and house museum in Salinas, California. The house was the birthplace and family home of author John Steinbeck (1902–1968). It is noted for its Queen Anne architecture. The building was added to the National Register of Historic Places in 2000.

== History ==
The Steinbeck House is a turreted Victorian building at 132 Central Avenue in downtown Salinas. It is a two-story wood framed Queen Anne style residence constructed in 1897–98. The house is on a concrete foundation with a full basement. Exterior walls are a combination of horizontal wood siding and buttwood shingles. It has a hip and gable roof covered in fiberglass shingles. An open wood staircase leads to the upper floor, which was first used as an indoor playroom until 1905 when the bedrooms and bathroom were added. The garage space under the house was converted into a gift shop in 1974 and named "The Best Cellar."

The house has been preserved and restored by the Valley Guild, a nonprofit organization, established in 1971 by civic-minded women. They purchased the house from the Catholic Diocese of Monterey in 1973. The Steinbeck House is significant under National Register Criterion B, in literature, for its association with John Steinbeck, who was born and spent his early years in the home, and wrote his first short stories, and completed two of his novels, The Red Pony (1933) and Tortilla Flat (1935). The home played an important part in his novel East of Eden (1952). The house is significant under National Register Criterion C, in the area of architecture, as an example of the Queen Anne architectural style.

The Steinbeck House is open as a restaurant for lunch and for tours during the summer on Sundays from Memorial Day to Labor Day. The National Steinbeck Center is located two blocks away at 1 Main Street.

Sheriff William Nesbitt (1853-1933) lived in the house two blocks west of the Steinbecks' home, located at 66 Capitol Street. Peter Krough's daughter Olga E. Krough (1899-1990), knew Steinbeck when they were both children. She lived at 146 Central Avenue, three houses down from the John Steinbeck House.

== Gallery ==
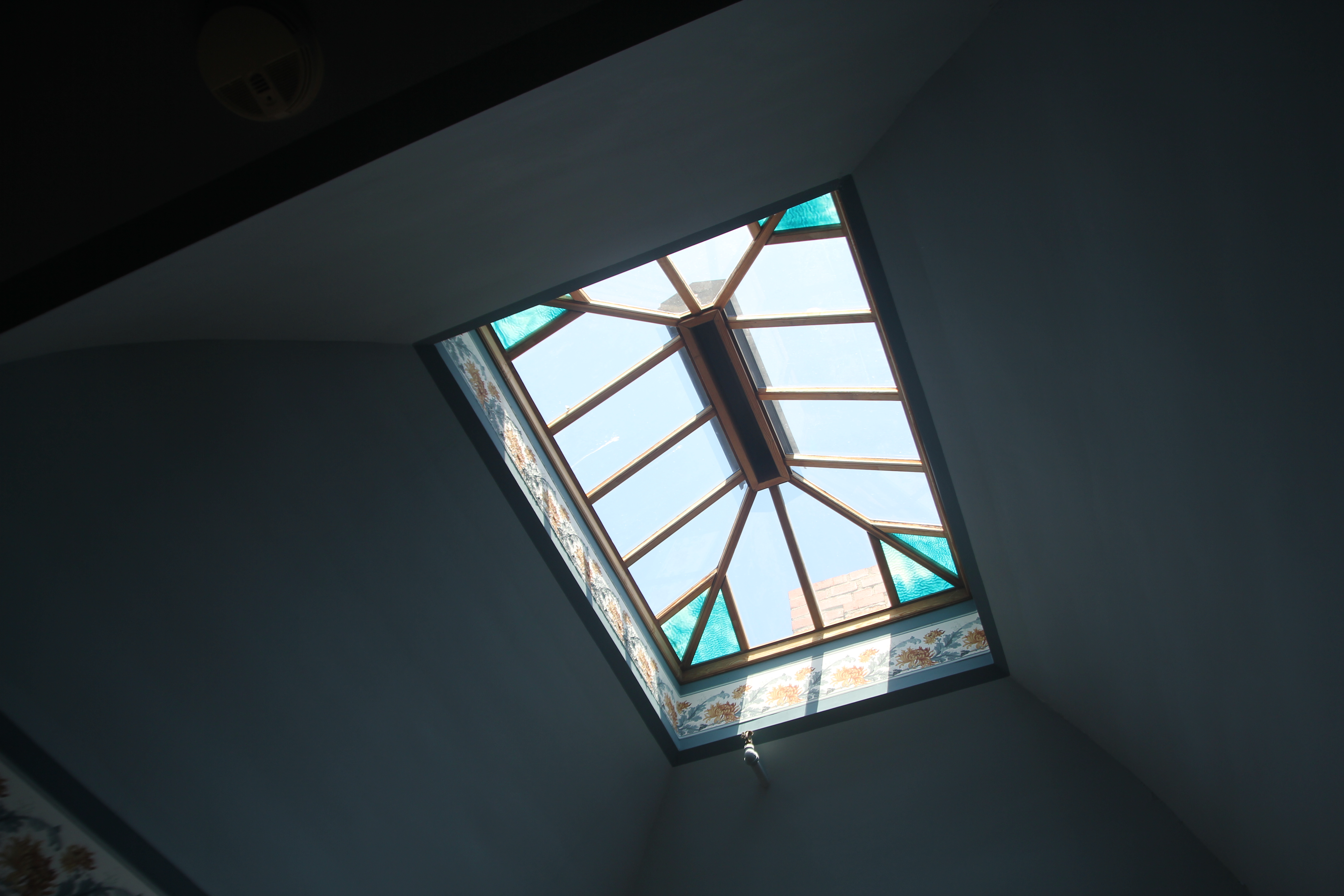
Skylight

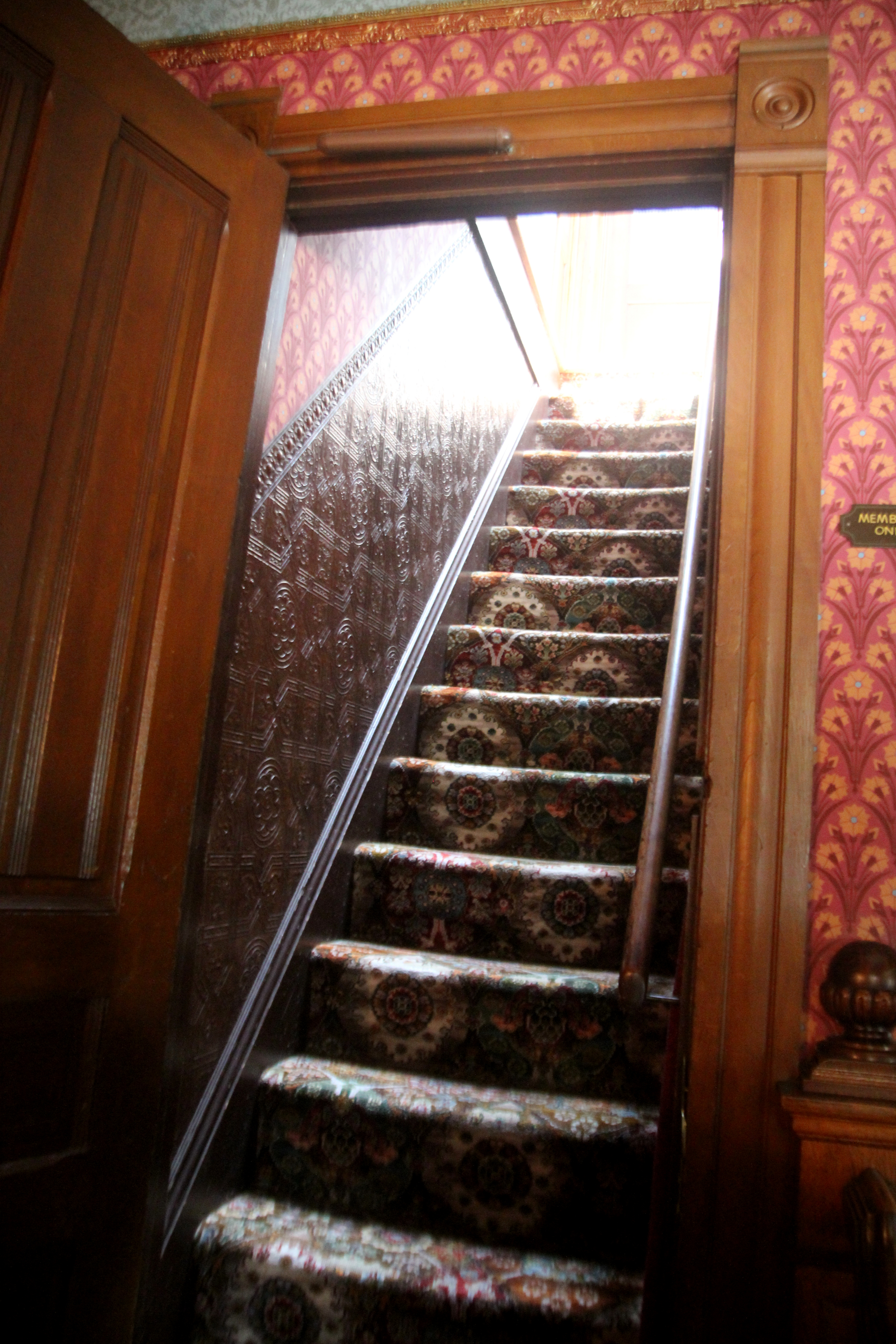
Staircase

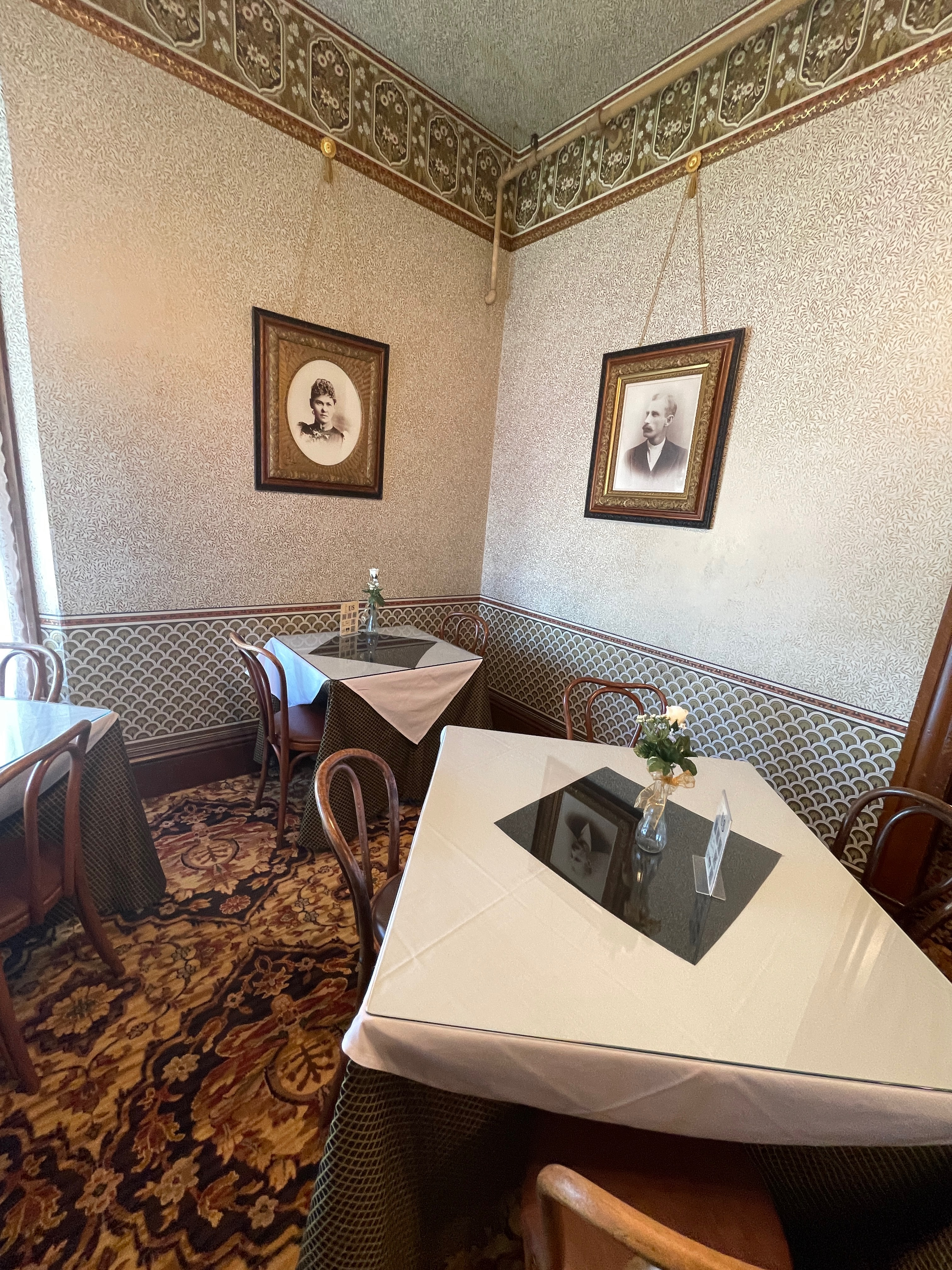
Dining room

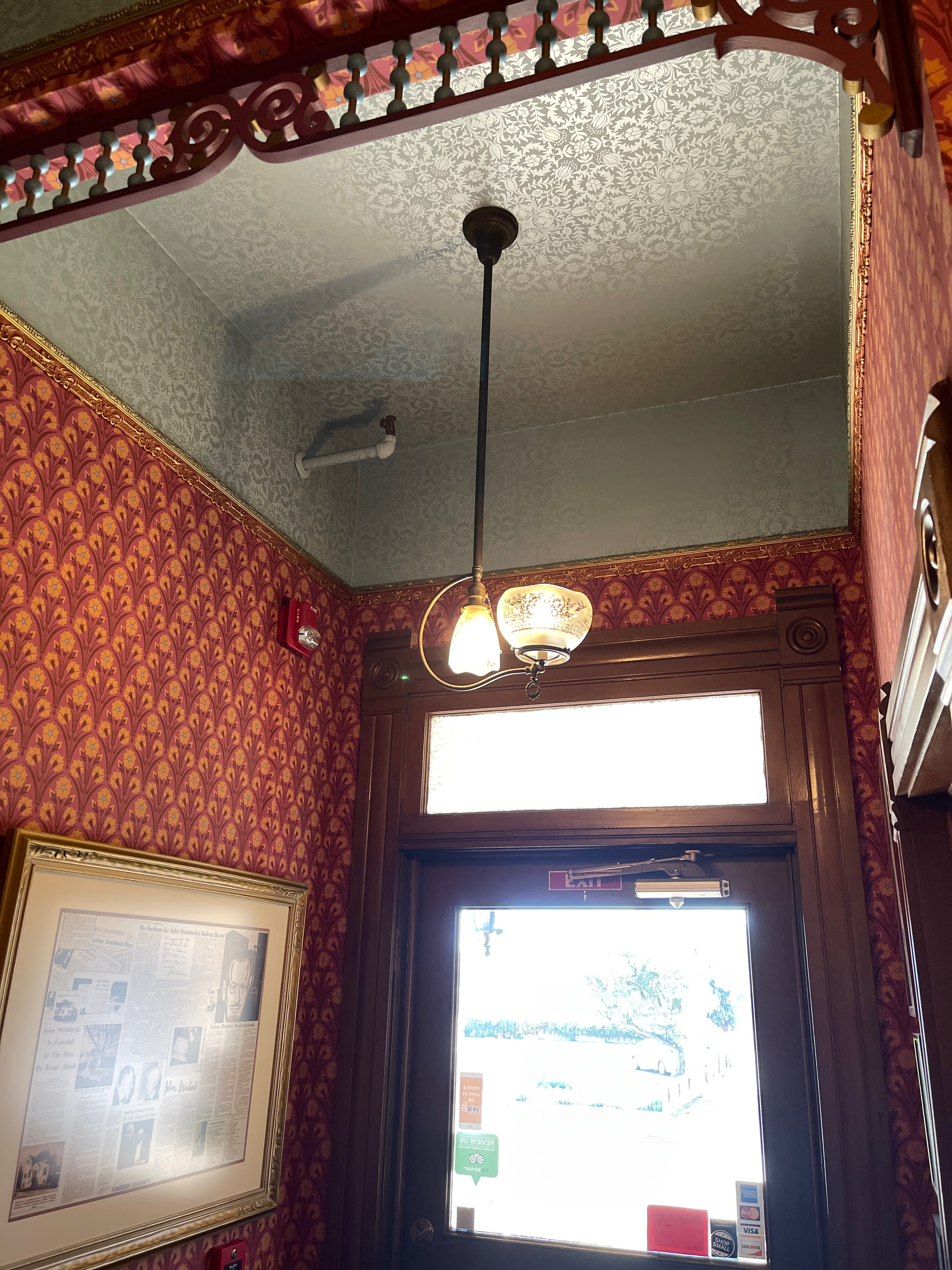
House entryway

== See also ==
- National Register of Historic Places listings in Monterey County, California
- John Steinbeck House (Monte Sereno, California), another Steinbeck home on the NRHP
