= Matt Zien =

American television and documentary film producer

- Occupations: Television and film producer
- Notable work: The Curse of Von Dutch: A Brand to Die For, Slauson Rec, This Is Paris, Leah Remini: Scientology and the Aftermath
- Spouse: Kirsten Zien (m. 2017)

Matt Zien is an American television and documentary film producer. He is known for developing and producing nonfiction series and feature documentaries, including The Curse of Von Dutch: A Brand to Die For, This Is Paris, Leah Remini: Scientology and the Aftermath, and Slauson Rec (2025), which premiered in the Cannes Classics section of the Cannes Film Festival.

== Early life and education ==
Zien studied at the University of Southern California’s School of Cinematic Arts, where he developed a background in storytelling and documentary filmmaking.

== Career ==
=== Early work ===
Zien began his career in unscripted television development, working at All3Media America and Studio Lambert on reality and documentary projects for major networks.

=== The Intellectual Property Corporation ===
In 2016, Zien joined The Intellectual Property Corporation (IPC) as its first development executive. He later became Vice-President of Development and Creative Director, and head of brand development for Industrial Media, overseeing more than 20 series and specials across HBO, Amazon, Netflix, Showtime, and A&E.

While at IPC, Zien developed the Emmy-winning series Leah Remini: Scientology and the Aftermath (A&E), which won the Primetime Emmy Award for Outstanding Informational Series or Special in 2017 and Outstanding Hosted Nonfiction Series or Special in 2020.

He was promoted to senior vice-president prior to the sale of Industrial Media to Sony Pictures Television in 2022, a deal reportedly valued at US$350 million.

=== Recent projects ===
Zien served as producer on the true-crime docuseries The Curse of Von Dutch: A Brand to Die For (Hulu, 2021), which explored the turbulent rise and fall of the Von Dutch fashion brand.

In 2025 he produced Slauson Rec, a feature documentary directed by Leo Lewis O’Neil. The film, which uses more than 800 hours of footage to explore Shia LaBeouf’s theater collective, premiered at the Cannes Film Festival. In an interview with Deadline, Zien described the independently funded project as “the dream,” recalling that on the first day of post-production O’Neil wrote “We Cannes do it” on the office whiteboard.

In 2024, Zien produced Lincoln at Gettysburg, a 6-minute AI-driven short film that swept the AI International Film Festival, winning Best Picture, Best AI Film, Best Cinematography, Best Sound, plus Audience Choice Awards for Best Message, Best Film, and Best Use of AI.

In 2025, Zien’s AI-driven mockumentary The First Humans won the Mockumentary Award at the MetaMorph AI Film Awards. The festival described his work as pushing the boundaries of generative cinema, and Zien reflected in an accompanying interview on how AI enabled him to visualize 300,000 years of human prehistory.

=== KNGMKR Labs ===
Zien is the founder of KNGMKR Labs, a creative studio focused on experimental content at the intersection of cinema, technology, and culture. Alongside co-founder Mac Boucher, Zien has developed speculative, AI-assisted video-art projects including Camelot, an alternate-history JFK narrative created using generative tools. In a 2025 Forbes feature on emerging XR technologies, Matt Zien was described as a “nonfiction‑TV and film vet turned AI filmmaker,” highlighting his crossover into AI-enhanced creative media. That same year, GamePressure covered his short video Last Call Before A.G.I., created with eight AI tools, noting that it was “so good that some have called it art” in response to audience reactions on YouTube and Reddit. In 2025, Zien’s short film Forgive the Haters was cited during a Masters of Scale podcast interview with Runway CEO Cristóbal Valenzuela, in a discussion about AI filmmaking’s impact on Hollywood.

== Selected filmography ==
=== Television ===
- Leah Remini: Scientology and the Aftermath – development executive
- The Curse of Von Dutch: A Brand to Die For – producer
- This Giant Beast That Is the Global Economy – consulting producer
- Free Meek – development executive
- This Is Paris – consulting producer
- Indian Matchmaking – development executive
- Night Stalker: The Hunt for a Serial Killer – development executive'
- Empires of New York - consulting producer

=== Film ===
- Slauson Rec (2025) – produced by
