= Eli Holzman =

American television producer and writer

- Born: March 30, 1974 (age 52); New York City, U.S.
- Occupations: Television producer, screenwriter
- Writing career
- Period: 1998–present
- Genres: Reality television, documentary, feature films
- Notable works: Project Runway; Project Greenlight; Undercover Boss; United Shades of America; The People's Couch; Leah Remini: Scientology and the Aftermath; The Seven Five; Free Meek; Living Undocumented; American Idol; So You Think You Can Dance; Night Stalker: The Hunt for a Serial Killer
- Website: theipcorp.com sonypictures.com/tv/nonfiction

Eli Holzman is an American creator–developer, writer, producer and television executive. He is known for creating or serving as executive producer on a number of reality-based television series and documentaries, such as Project Runway, Project Greenlight, The Seven Five, Undercover Boss, Leah Remini: Scientology and the Aftermath, Free Meek, Living Undocumented, American Idol and So You Think You Can Dance.

Holzman is the founder and CEO of The Intellectual Property Corporation. He is the former head of Miramax Television, Katalyst Films, Studio Lambert, All3Media America and Sony Pictures Television Nonfiction. He has won four Primetime Emmy Awards for the television series' Leah Remini: Scientology and the Aftermath and Undercover Boss, and won the PGA Award for Outstanding Producer of Non-Fiction Television for Scientology and the Aftermath in 2016.

== Career ==
=== Miramax ===
After graduating from The Bronx High School of Science, Eli Holzman began his career at Miramax Films in early 1996. There, he worked on numerous films, including In Too Deep and Rounders. Holzman was soon promoted to junior executive, working for top exec Meryl Poster. As a junior executive, he identified television as an untapped market for the studio.

Holzman moved to Los Angeles in 1998 to play a role in founding Miramax's television arm, Miramax Television. While there, he helped develop a wide variety of projects, covering the full breadth of genres, including Kevin Smith's Clerks: The Animated Series, Kevin Williamson's Wasteland for ABC, Glory Days for The WB and The Nanny Diaries. Holzman's first major unscripted hit series came after he developed and produced the HBO series Project Greenlight with Ben Affleck and Matt Damon, helping to drive the initial boom in popularity for reality television shows. He was soon promoted to the top executive position at Miramax Television where he created the popular show Project Runway, which has run for 17 seasons to date and currently airs on Bravo in the United States.

=== Katalyst Films ===
After his departure from Miramax, Holzman was hired in 2005 as president of Ashton Kutcher's production company Katalyst Films, best known for the MTV prank series Punk'd. In 2005, Holzman developed and launched the reality television show Beauty and the Geek and developed Katalyst's inaugural slate of scripted programming.

=== Independent producer ===
In 2006, Holzman left Katalyst to become an independent producer. While independent, he created and/or executive produced such primetime reality shows as the CW reality series Stylista, along with Desiree Gruber, Jane Cha, Tyra Banks and Ken Mok. Holzman was inspired to create Stylista after a meeting with Anna Wintour. Holzman also served as the executive producer on the first two seasons of the G4 reality series The Block. In 2009, he co-created Bravo reality series Work of Art: The Next Great Artist with Sarah Jessica Parker.

=== Studio Lambert ===
Holzman founded and ran Studio Lambert's American business when it was launched in 2008, serving as the company's president. He was recruited for the role by reality television executive Stephen Lambert. Lambert and Holzman's first collaboration was the CBS reality show Undercover Boss, which premiered to 38.7 million viewers after the Super Bowl, the largest audience ever for a new series following the Super Bowl. The show went on to earn two Primetime Emmy Awards. In November 2010, Holzman and Lambert published a book entitled Undercover Boss: Inside the TV Phenomenon That Is Changing Bosses and Employees Everywhere.

While at Studio Lambert USA, Holzman oversaw and launched a variety of other reality shows, including The Pitch for AMC, Consumed for CNBC, The People's Couch for Bravo, The Million Second Quiz for NBC, Weed Country and Outlaw Empires for Discovery, Trouble Next Door for OWN, Be The Boss for TNT, Rat Bastards and Diamond Divers for Spike, Mel B: It's a Scary World for Style Network, Fairy Jobmother and Supermarket Superstar for Lifetime, Mystery Millionaire for WEtv, Model Employee for VH1, and Southern Fried Stings for TruTV.

=== All3Media America ===
In 2013, Studio Lambert USA merged with the other Los Angeles-based production companies owned by British super-indie All3Media to form All3Media America. Holzman oversaw the operation which housed production companies including Studio Lambert USA, Maverick, Objective, Lime Pictures, Morocco Junction, MME/Filmpool, and Zoo Productions. Holzman also launched All3Media's American scripted television operation. Series produced under the various All3Media America companies included Make Me a Millionaire Inventor for CNBC, Slednecks for MTV, True Tori for Lifetime, Chrisley Knows Best for USA, Hot Grits for VH1, Work Out New York for Bravo, and United Shades of America and Declassified: The Untold Stories of American Spies for CNN.

In 2014, Holzman produced the critically acclaimed documentary The Seven Five, chronicling the misdeeds of the infamous, corrupt NYC cop Michael Dowd. The documentary is currently being adapted into a scripted feature by Sony Pictures and Annapurna, with Holzman producing.

=== The Intellectual Property Corporation (IPC) ===
In 2016, Holzman left All3Media America to found and launch The Intellectual Property Corporation (IPC), assuming the role of CEO. Aaron Saidman, previously the EVP of All3Media America, joined him as co-founder and president. The company was financed by private equity investors, Sheldon Yellen, Michael G. Rubin, and David J. Adelman. Yellen and Rubin had both previously appeared on Undercover Boss. As CEO of IPC, Holzman oversees the company's day-to-day operations and its diverse slate of series, features, and projects in development across broadcast, cable and the major streaming services. As President of SPT Nonfiction, Holzman oversees the independent production companies which form the SPT Nonfiction group: 19 Entertainment & 19 Recordings, Sharp Entertainment, B17 Entertainment, Maxine, This Machine Filmworks, Trilogy Films, House of Non-Fiction, and The Intellectual Property Corporation.

IPC soon went into production on its inaugural series, Leah Remini: Scientology and the Aftermath for A&E, and was the television network's highest rated premiere in two years. The series became a commercial and critical success, winning a Primetime Emmy Award in 2017.

At IPC, Holzman has created and produced a broad range of unscripted television series, including Living Undocumented for Netflix, Free Meek and This Giant Beast That Is The Global Economy for Amazon, The Substitute and America's Most Musical Family for Nickelodeon, Kingpin for History, Active Shooter: America Under Fire for Showtime, Mind Field for YouTube Premium, Sticker Shock for Discovery, and the critically acclaimed feature documentary Operation Odessa, which currently holds a "100% Fresh" rating on Rotten Tomatoes.

In 2017, The Hollywood Reporter included Holzman and Saidman on their list of "Reality TV's Ruling Class: The Top 10 Players of 2017." In 2019, it was announced that Holzman would serve as a producer on the HBO drama series Dirty Thirty, created by Courtney Kemp. The project is currently in development.

=== Industrial Media ===
In 2018, Core Media acquired The Intellectual Property Corporation and immediately relaunched as Industrial Media, with Holzman assuming the role of CEO and board member, while remaining the CEO of IPC. Aaron Saidman became president of Industrial Media, while remaining the president of IPC. Comprising 19 Entertainment, Sharp Entertainment, B17, and The Intellectual Property Corporation, Industrial Media had over 40 series on 20 different networks at launch.

Industrial Media has since entered deals with production companies including RJ Cutler's This Machine and Don Cheadle's Radicle Act.

As CEO of Industrial Media, Holzman also serves as an executive producer on ABC's American Idol, and FOX's So You Think You Can Dance.

In May 2021, Deadline announced Holzman would be the executive producer of The D'Amelio Show.

=== Sony Pictures Entertainment ===
In March 2022, Sony Pictures Entertainment acquired Industrial Media and Holzman was named President of Sony Pictures Television Nonfiction. As President of SPT Nonfiction, Holzman oversees the independent production companies which form the SPT Nonfiction group: 19 Entertainment & 19 Recordings, Sharp Entertainment, B17 Entertainment, Maxine, This Machine Filmworks, This Radicle Act Productions, Trilogy Films, House of Non-Fiction, and The Intellectual Property Corporation.

In 2026, Holzman and Saidman left Sony Pictures Television Nonfiction along with their production company The Intellectual Property Corporation.

=== Entrepreneurial endeavors ===
In 2008, Holzman invented the frozen novelties Q-Bee Treats, rice crispy treats and brownies filled with ice cream. The novelties were sold nationwide in stores such as Whole Foods and Safeway. In 2010, Holzman became a founding and managing partner of The Meatball Shop restaurant group. In 2014, he became a founding partner of Itani Ramen in Oakland, California. Both restaurants were partnerships led by Holzman's brother, celebrity chef Daniel Holzman.

== Personal life ==
Holzman lives in Venice Beach, California, with his two children.

== Awards ==
Primetime Emmy Award wins

- 2012: Outstanding Reality Program – Undercover Boss
- 2013: Outstanding Reality Program – Undercover Boss
- 2017: Outstanding Informational Series or Special – Leah Remini: Scientology and the Aftermath
- 2020: Outstanding Hosted Nonfiction Series or Special – Leah Remini: Scientology and the Aftermath: Waiting for Justice

Primetime Emmy Award nominations

- 2002: Outstanding Non-Fiction Program – Project Greenlight
- 2004: Outstanding Reality Program - Project Greenlight
- 2005: Outstanding Reality Program – Project Runway
- 2005: Outstanding Reality Program – Project Greenlight
- 2010: Outstanding Reality Program – Undercover Boss
- 2011: Outstanding Reality Program – Undercover Boss
- 2014: Outstanding Structured Reality Program – Undercover Boss
- 2015: Outstanding Structured Reality Program – Undercover Boss
- 2016: Outstanding Unstructured Reality Program United Shades of America
- 2018: Outstanding Informational Series or Special - Leah Remini: Scientology and the Aftermath
- 2019: Outstanding Informational Series or Special - Leah Remini: Scientology and the Aftermath
- 2020: Outstanding Unstructured Reality Program - We're Here
- 2021: Outstanding Unstructured Reality Program - Indian Matchmaking
- 2023: Outstanding Unstructured Reality Program - Indian Matchmaking
- 2024: Outstanding Documentary or Nonfiction Series - Quiet on Set: The Dark Side of Kids TV

Critics' Choice Real TV Awards wins

- 2022: Outstanding Achievement in Nonfiction Production: The Intellectual Property Corporation
- 2022: Best Crime/Justice Show: Secrets of Playboy
- 2022: Best Culinary Show: Cooking With Paris

Critics' Choice Real TV Awards nominations

- 2021: Outstanding Achievement in Nonfiction Production: The Intellectual Property Corporation
- 2022: Best Unstructured Series: We're Here

MTV Movie & TV Awards wins

- 2021: Best New Unscripted Series: Selena + Chef
- 2022: Best Lifestyle Show: Selena + Chef
- 2022: Best New Unscripted Series: The D'Amelio Show

MTV Movie & TV Awards nominations

- 2022: Best Reality Return: Cooking With Paris

News & Documentary Emmy Award nominations

- 2018: Outstanding Social Issue Documentary: Active Shooter: America Under Fire
- 2020: Outstanding Editing: Documentary: Living Undocumented

Daytime Emmy Award nominations

- 2019: Outstanding Education or Informational Series – Mind Field
- 2018: Outstanding Education or Informational Series – Mind Field

Film Independent Spirit Awards nominations

- 2021: Best New Non-Scripted or Documentary Series – We're Here

Producers Guild of America Award wins

- 2018: Outstanding Producer of Non-Fiction Television – Leah Remini: Scientology and the Aftermath

Producers Guild of America Award nominations

- 2003: Television Producer of the Year Award in Reality/Game/Informational Series – Project Greenlight
- 2004: Television Producer of the Year Award in Reality/Game/Informational Series – Project Greenlight
- 2011: Outstanding Producer of Non-Fiction Television – Undercover Boss
- 2012: Outstanding Producer of Non-Fiction Television - Undercover Boss
- 2019: Outstanding Producer of Non-Fiction Television - Leah Remini: Scientology and the Aftermath

Realscreen Awards Award wins

- 2020: Non-Fiction - Crime & Investigation Program - Kids Behind Bars: Life or Parole
- 2021: Non-Fiction - Arts & Culture Program - Free Meek
- 2022: Lifestyle - Studio-based Food Program - Selena + Chef

Realscreen Awards Award nominations

- 2022: Reality - Structured Reality - Selena + Chef

International Documentary Association Award nominations

- 2016: Best Episodic Series - United Shades of America
- 2019: Best Episodic Series - Kids Behind Bars: Life or Parole
- 2019: Best Episodic Series - Living Undocumented
- 2021: Best Episodic Series - We're Here

GLAAD Media Awards Award wins

- 2021: Outstanding Reality Program - We're Here

Television Critics Association Awards Award wins

- 2017: Outstanding Achievement in Reality Programming - Leah Remini: Scientology and the Aftermath

Television Critics Association Awards Award nominations

- 2020: Outstanding Achievement in Reality Programming - We're Here

IDA Awards Award nominations

- 2021: Best Episodic Series - We're Here

Taste Awards Award wins

- 2021: Best Home Chef in a Series - Selena + Chef
- 2022: Best Home Chef in a Series - Selena + Chef

== Filmography ==
Executive producer

- 2001: Project Greenlight
- 2004: Project Runway
- 2005: Beauty and the Geek
- 2007: The Block
- 2008: Stylista
- 2009: Fabulously Richie
- 2010: Southern Fried Stings
- 2010: Undercover Boss
- 2010: Work of Art: The Next Great Artist
- 2010: The Fairy Jobmother
- 2010: Mel B: It's a Scary World
- 2010: Dance Complex
- 2012: Outlaw Empires
- 2012: Diamond Divers
- 2012: Rat Bastards
- 2012: Be The Boss
- 2012: Supermarket Superstar
- 2013: Trouble Next Door
- 2013: Weed Country
- 2013: The Million Second Quiz
- 2013: The Pitch
- 2013: The People's Couch
- 2013: Goin' Pearl Crazy
- 2014: Make Me a Millionaire Inventor
- 2014: Mystery Millionaire
- 2014: Slednecks
- 2014: True Tori
- 2014: Chrisley Knows Best
- 2014: The Seven Five
- 2015: Hot Grits
- 2015: Consumed: The Real Restaurant Business
- 2015: Work Out New York
- 2016: True Life
- 2016: United Shades of America
- 2016: Leah Remini: Scientology and the Aftermath
- 2017: Mind Field
- 2017: Active Shooter: America Under Fire
- 2018: Operation Odessa
- 2018: Kingpin
- 2018: Sticker Shock
- 2018: Cults and Extreme Belief
- 2018: The Price of Duty
- 2018: Lost Gold
- 2019: Deadly Cults
- 2019: This Giant Beast That Is The Global Economy
- 2019: Kids Behind Bars: Life or Parole
- 2019: Almost Ready
- 2019: Injustice with Nancy Grace
- 2019: Free Meek
- 2019: Living Undocumented
- 2020: Indian Matchmaking
- 2021: The D'Amelio Show
- 2021: Cooking with Paris
