= 12 Hours With =

- Genre: Documentary
- Created by: Eli Holzman; Aaron Saidman
- Directed by: Jonatán López; Cassius Corrigan; Ariel Navarrete Spahn
- Starring: Maluma; Anitta; Prince Royce; Mariah Angeliq
- Country of origin: United States
- Original language: English
- No. of seasons: 1
- No. of episodes: 4

Production
- Executive producers: Eli Holzman; Aaron Saidman; Shira Brown; Dana Droppo; Leila Cobo Hanlon; Julian Holguin; Christina Medina; Rachelle Mendez; Mark Bracero
- Producers: Martin Morales; Chloe Broomfield; Aline Andrade
- Cinematography: Freddie Whitman; Emmanuella Zachariou
- Editors: Sean Gill; Carlos Gamarra; Gonzalo Torres; Derek Chin
- Running time: 12–14 minutes
- Production companies: Billboard; The Intellectual Property Corporation

Original release
- Network: Facebook Watch
- Release: October 8 – October 18, 2021

12 Hours With is an American documentary web series that was released from October 8 to 18, 2021 on Facebook Watch for National Hispanic Heritage Month. The four-episode miniseries follows Latin American singers and pop icons Maluma, Anitta, Prince Royce, and Mariah Angeliq as they return to their touring schedules in the wake of the COVID-19 pandemic.

== Premise ==
Four Latin American music artists (Maluma, born in Colombia; Anitta, born in Brazil; Mariah Angelique, born in Miami to Cuban and Puerto Rican parents; and Prince Royce, born in New York City to Dominican parents) reflect upon how their heritage and roots helped build a foundation for their music careers.

== Episodes ==
No.	Title	Original release date
1	"Maluma Returns with His Most Ambitious Tour Yet"	October 8, 2021
Maluma shares an unfiltered, behind-the-scenes look at the opening night of his "Papi Juancho" tour, showing why Colombia and family will always have a special place in his heart.
2	"Inside Anitta's Mission to Bring Brazil to the World"	October 13, 2021
Behind-the-scenes of Anitta's performance at Billboard Latin Music Week, she details her leap of faith to leave studying business to becoming an international star.
3	"Prince Royce Brings the Energy to Latin Music's Biggest Night"	October 14, 2021
Five-time 2021 finalist Prince Royce shares his journey to the Billboard Latin Music Awards, where he performed "Lao a Lao" for the first time.
4	"Mariah Angeliq Is Just Getting Started"	October 15, 2021
Mariah Angeliq takes fans into the studio as she works on her debut studio album, where she performs a special acoustic rendition of "Diablita" for her mom ahead of its release.

== See also ==
- List of original programs distributed by Facebook Watch
