= MSQ =

MSQ may refer to:

- the IATA airport code of Minsk National Airport, in Belarus;
- the Minnesota Satisfaction Questionnaire, a survey used to measure job satisfaction in work organizations.
- The Million Second Quiz, a short-lived 2013 NBC game show.
- Minimum Standard Quality, a measure of quality.
- Main Scenario Quest (Main Storyline Quest), from Final Fantasy XIV, are quests related to the main narrative.
