= The D'Amelio Show =

2021 American reality TV series

- Genre: Reality television
- Starring: Charli D'Amelio; Dixie D'Amelio; Heidi D'Amelio; Marc D'Amelio
- Country of origin: United States
- Original language: English
- No. of seasons: 3
- No. of episodes: 28

Production
- Executive producers: Aaron Saidman; Eli Holzman; Sara Reddy
- Production companies: The Intellectual Property Corporation; The D'Amelios

Original release
- Network: Hulu
- Release: September 3, 2021 – October 18, 2023

The D'Amelio Show is an American reality television series which focuses on the personal lives of the D'Amelio family. The series focuses mainly on sisters Charli and Dixie, and their parents Heidi and Marc.

== Cast ==
=== Main ===
- Charli D'Amelio
- Dixie D'Amelio
- Heidi D'Amelio
- Marc D'Amelio

=== Recurring ===
- Chase Hudson (season 1)
- Noah Beck (seasons 1-2)
- Landon Barker (season 3)

== Episodes ==
Season	Episodes	Originally released	
Season	Episodes	First released	Last released
1	8	September 3, 2021	
2	10	September 28, 2022	October 26, 2022
3	10	September 20, 2023	October 18, 2023

=== Season 1 (2021) ===
No. overall	No. in season	Title	Original release date
1	1	"Charli D'Amelio? What the Heck?"	September 3, 2021
2	2	"A True Story of Us"	September 3, 2021
3	3	"No One Ever Says That to Your Face"	September 3, 2021
4	4	"Do You Feel Like It's Worth It?"	September 3, 2021
5	5	"Head On a Swivel"	September 3, 2021
6	6	"Are You Okay?"	September 3, 2021
7	7	"Nothing Is As It Seems Online"	September 3, 2021
8	8	"Here's to 17!"	September 3, 2021

=== Season 2 (2022) ===
No. overall	No. in season	Title	Original release date
9	1	"Somewhere to Start"	September 28, 2022
10	2	"The Time of My Life"	September 28, 2022
11	3	"Going Through a Break-Up"	October 5, 2022
12	4	"Clout-Chasing Sister"	October 5, 2022
13	5	"Public Drama"	October 12, 2022
14	6	"Something's Off"	October 12, 2022
15	7	"Charli Lied to Me"	October 19, 2022
16	8	"At Your First and At Your Worst"	October 19, 2022
17	9	"You're Being Drama"	October 26, 2022
18	10	"This Season Has Been a Rollercoaster"	October 26, 2022

=== Season 3 (2023) ===
No. overall	No. in season	Title	Original release date
19	1	"All Filters Are Off"	September 20, 2023
20	2	"Human Punching Bag"	September 20, 2023
21	3	"We Are Going to Milan!"	September 27, 2023
22	4	"Pretend Like Everything's OK"	September 27, 2023
23	5	"There's So Many Sides to This Story"	October 4, 2023
24	6	"I Hate Charli D'Amelio"	October 4, 2023
25	7	"More Than Friends?"	October 11, 2023
26	8	"This is the Life Everyone Asked For"	October 11, 2023
27	9	"Wait, They Broke Up?"	October 18, 2023
28	10	"Not As Picture Perfect as it Seemed"	October 18, 2023

== Release ==
The D'Amelio Show premiered on September 3, 2021, on the streaming service Hulu in the United States, with its first season consisting of eight episodes. Internationally, it premiered on Disney+ under the dedicated streaming hub Star, as an original series, Disney+ Hotstar, and on Star+ in Latin America.

In November 2021, it was renewed for a second season, which premiered on September 28, 2022. The second season contained ten episodes. In December 2022, the series was renewed for a third season that premiered on September 20, 2023. In June 2024, the show was cancelled after three seasons.

== Reception ==
=== Audience viewership ===
The series became the most-watched unscripted series among all first-season titles in the genre on Hulu along with its second season.

=== Critical response ===
Mariana Trimble of Washington Square News called The D'Amelio Show a "surprisingly humble look at TikTok’s most famous family," writing, "The D’Amelio Show is a subdued take on the reality TV genre that authentically embraces its stars’ hardships rather than focusing on petty drama. You may be shocked to find that you have more in common with celebrities than you thought." Melissa Camacho of Common Sense Media gave the show a grade of 3 out of 5 stars, writing, "It reveals the behind-the-scenes work that goes into building, and maintaining, a career on social media. The negative impact some of the negative aspects of being an online influencer, and its impact on people's mental health." [sic]

=== Accolades ===
The D'Amelio Show won Best New Unscripted Series at the 2022 MTV Movie & TV Awards.
