= Living Undocumented =

2019 docu-series on Netflix

- Genre: Docuseries
- Directed by: Aaron Saidman; Anna Chai
- Country of origin: United States
- Original languages: English; Spanish; Hebrew
- No. of seasons: 1
- No. of episodes: 6

Production
- Executive producers: Selena Gomez; Mandy Teefey; Eli Holzman; Aaron Saidman; Sean O’Grady; Anna Chai
- Production companies: The Intellectual Property Corporation; July Moon Productions; Kicked to the Curb Productions

Original release
- Network: Netflix
- Release: October 2, 2019

Living Undocumented is a 2019 Netflix documentary series co-directed by Aaron Saidman and Anna Chai and executive produced by Selena Gomez, Mandy Teefey, Eli Holzman, Saidman, Sean O'Grady and Chai. The series documents eight illegal immigrant families living in the United States. The series was produced by Industrial Media-owned production company The Intellectual Property Corporation. It was released on October 2, 2019.

According to an op-ed written by Gomez for Time on October 1, 2019, Gomez said she was approached about the project in 2017 and decided to become involved after watching footage that captured "the shame, uncertainty, and fear I saw my own family struggle with. But it also captured the hope, optimism, and patriotism so many undocumented immigrants still hold in their hearts despite the hell they go through.”

== Episodes ==
| No. | Title | Original release date |
|---|---|---|
| 1 | "A Prayer in the Night" | October 2, 2019 |
| 2 | "The World Is Watching" | October 2, 2019 |
| 3 | "The Deportation" | October 2, 2019 |
| 4 | "The Crossing" | October 2, 2019 |
| 5 | "A Family Torn Apart" | October 2, 2019 |
| 6 | "Home Sweet Home" | October 2, 2019 |

== Episodes Synopsis ==
Episode One: "A Prayer in the Night"

Episode one begins with immigrant families portraying an image of how it feels to live in the United States as an undocumented person. The beginning shifts focus and attributes the fear of deportation due to President Trump's stance on immigration and border enforcement. The episode shares three main stories:

- Luis and Kenia's story is centered around both not being residents of the United States. Luis is a Honduran asylum seeker. In the episode, Luis is seen taking Noah, Kenia's son, to an ICE detention center to be with his mother as they are both subjects of possible deportation. Luis is very scared throughout the trip as police can detain him at any given moment. Ultimately, Keina's appeal to pause her deportation is denied.
- Ron and wife have been in the United States for 17 years, living as undocumented people. They have built their business, using a tax ID instead of a Social Security number. Throughout the episode they do not reveal their last name, however, because of recent changes in sentiment toward immigration policy, they have concerns about ICE possibility of targeting them. The story of Ron and his wife shares the example of immigrants contributing to American society and economy and still having feelings of uncertainty.
- Alejandra is a mother who fled Mexico and crossed the border twice before settling in the United States. In the United States, she married a military man and settled. However, her appeal to stop her deportation has been denied. The episode makes comparisons involving irony due to the fact her husband voted for Donald Trump, who has had an isolationist stance on immigration.

These three stories are intended to show how immigrant families are being affected by immigration policies that tend to be strict.

Episode Two: "The World is Watching"

Episode two goes further in-depth into the lives of the families depicted in episode one:

- Luis goes on a typical trip to meet Kenia and her son. However, ICE does not allow Kenia to come outside and instead tells Luis to come inside and meet in the lobby. While Luis and his attorney see this as questionable, he is repeatedly reassured nothing will occur. Soon after, ICE agents come out and forcibly make Luis enter the building. His attorney is injured in the process.
- Ron and his wife's daughter receive DACA protection, which secures her residency in the United States for two years. However, because President Trump eliminated protections for immigrant children placed by former President Obama, there is worry between Ron and his wife on whether or not their daughter is safe. Ron is also faced with his mother's death, but he ultimately decides he cannot travel for the funeral as it would put his family in jeopardy.
- Alejandra has not been able to make any advancement for appeals as they continue to be denied. Attempts by her state senator to introduce a bull that would prevent her deportation were made, but they did not succeed.

Episode two illustrates how the immigration fears and anxiety have become a perpetual issue in many families who reside in the United States.

== Release ==
Living Undocumented was released on October 2, 2019, on Netflix.

== Reception ==
This docuseries, Living Undocumented, highlights eight families from different ethnic backgrounds allowing viewers to relate to and connect to their stories. This helps change the stereotype of only Mexicans being undocumented. Mexicans are a part of a large population of those who migrate to the U.S. which does not diminish other groups of people who migrate to this country. The docuseries sheds light on families from Honduras, Mexico, Colombia, Laos, Israel, and Mauritania which emphasizes diversity. Review aggregator Rotten Tomatoes reported an approval rating of 100% based on 5 reviews, with an average rating of 9/10 for the series.

=== Accolades ===
| Award | Date of ceremony | Category | Recipient(s) | Result | Ref. |
|---|---|---|---|---|---|
| International Documentary Association | December 7, 2019 | Best Episodic Series | Anna Chai, Aaron Saidman (directors); Eli Holzman, Sean O'Grady, Selena Gomez and Mandy Teefey (executive producers) | Nominated | |
| News and Documentary Emmy Awards | September 21–22, 2020 | Outstanding Editing: Documentary | Bradley Dean, Ed Greene, Kevin Hibbard & Vincent Oresman | Nominated | |
