= The Substitute (American TV program) =

American reality television series

- Genre: Reality
- Presented by: Juanpa Zurita
- Country of origin: United States
- Original language: English
- No. of seasons: 2
- No. of episodes: 24

Production
- Producers: Eli Holzman; Aaron Saidman
- Running time: 23 minutes
- Production company: The Intellectual Property Corporation

Original release
- Network: Nickelodeon
- Release: April 1, 2019 – February 25, 2021

The Substitute is an American reality television program that aired on Nickelodeon from April 1, 2019 to February 25, 2021. The program features pranks and celebrities going undercover as substitute teachers to surprise students, with $25,000 donations being made to each school they visit. The series was renewed for a second season hosted by Juanpa Zurita.

== Production ==
On February 14, 2019, it was announced that The Substitute would be a part of Nickelodeon's 2019 slate. The program is a production of The Intellectual Property Corporation, Eli Holzman, and Aaron Saidman, with Mike Harney serving as showrunner. On March 20, 2019, it was announced that the program would premiere on April 1, 2019, with Jace Norman guest starring in the premiere. A sneak peek of the first episode aired immediately following the 2019 Kids' Choice Awards on March 23, 2019. On May 6, 2019, it was announced that Lilly Singh would guest star in an episode airing on May 18, 2019. On August 28, 2019, it was announced that Nickelodeon ordered a full series pickup of The Substitute, with a 10-episode order for an October 2019 premiere. On September 18, 2019, it was announced that John Cena would guest star in an episode airing on October 4, 2019. On November 15, 2019, it was revealed that Ne-Yo would guest star in a holiday episode airing on November 30, 2019.

On January 17, 2020, it was revealed that Brie and Nikki Bella would guest star in an episode airing on January 31. It was also revealed that additional guest stars for future episodes would include Rico and Raini Rodriguez, Asher Angel, Shaun White, JoJo Siwa, Johnny Orlando, Kel Mitchell, and Cooper Barnes.

On October 23, 2020, it was announced that a second season would premiere on October 31 with Ariel Martin, Chloe Kim, and Chris Paul among the guest stars in the season. The season also added a new host, Juanpa Zurita.

== Episodes ==
=== Series overview ===
Season	Episodes	Originally released	
Season	Episodes	First released	Last released
1	12	April 1, 2019	March 28, 2020
2	12	October 31, 2020	February 25, 2021

=== Season 1 (2019–20) ===
No. overall	No. in season	Title	Original release date	Prod. code	U.S. viewers (millions)
1	1	"Jace Norman"	April 1, 2019	101	0.87
2	2	"Lilly Singh"	May 18, 2019	102	0.75
3	3	"John Cena"	October 4, 2019	103	0.71
4	4	"Ne-Yo"	November 30, 2019	104	0.47
5	5	"The Bella Twins"	January 31, 2020	110	0.39
6	6	"Rico & Raini Rodriguez"	February 7, 2020	106	0.36
7	7	"Asher Angel"	February 8, 2020	107	0.46
8	8	"Shaun White"	February 15, 2020	108	0.42
9	9	"JoJo Siwa"	February 22, 2020	105	0.55
10	10	"Johnny Orlando"	March 7, 2020	112	0.43
11	11	"Cooper Barnes"	March 14, 2020	109	0.51
12	12	"Kel Mitchell"	March 28, 2020	111	0.51

=== Season 2 (2020–21) ===
No. overall	No. in season	Title	Original release date	Prod. code	U.S. viewers (millions)
13	1	"Baby Ariel"	October 31, 2020	202	0.27
14	2	"Chloe Kim"	November 7, 2020	201	0.27
15	3	"Chris Paul"	November 14, 2020	203	0.20
16	4	"Gabriel Iglesias"	December 10, 2020	208	0.29
17	5	"The Miz"	January 7, 2021	205	0.26
18	6	"DeAndre Jordan"	January 14, 2021	206	0.38
19	7	"Peyton List"	January 21, 2021	204	0.44
20	8	"Zedd"	January 28, 2021	207	0.26
21	9	"Lele Pons"	February 4, 2021	210	0.44
22	10	"Why Don't We"	February 11, 2021	209	0.24
23	11	"Ty Dolla $ign"	February 18, 2021	212	0.20
24	12	"Juanpa Zurita"	February 25, 2021	211	0.23

=== Special ===
Title	Original release date	Prod. code	U.S. viewers (millions)
"Top 10 Wildest Pranks"	May 9, 2020	999	0.40

== Ratings ==
Viewership and ratings per season of The Substitute
Season	Episodes	First aired		Last aired		Avg. viewers (millions)
Season	Episodes	Date	Viewers (millions)	Date	Viewers (millions)	Avg. viewers (millions)
1	12	April 1, 2019	0.87	March 28, 2020	0.51	0.54
2	12	October 31, 2020	0.27	February 25, 2021	0.23	0.29
