= Hayley Taylor (disambiguation) =

Hayley Taylor is a singer-songwriter and actress.

Hayley Taylor may also refer to:

- Hayley Taylor (presenter), English television presenter
- Hayley Lewis, married name Hayley Taylor
- Hayley Taylor-Block from List of Fame (1982 TV series) episodes
