= Cults and Extreme Belief =

2018 American TV documentary series

- Genre: Documentary
- Presented by: Elizabeth Vargas
- Country of origin: United States
- Original language: English
- No. of seasons: 1
- No. of episodes: 9

Production
- Executive producers: Aaron Saidman; Alex Weresow; Amy Savitsky; Elaine Frontain Bryant; Eli Holzman; Evan Lerner; Rachelle Mendez
- Running time: 41–43 minutes
- Production company: The Intellectual Property Corporation

Original release
- Network: A&E
- Release: May 28 – July 22, 2018

Cults and Extreme Belief (also known as A&E Investigates: Cults and Extreme Belief) is an American documentary series on A&E. The show premiered on May 28, 2018, and is hosted by Elizabeth Vargas and the first under A&E Original's A&E Investigates journalistic banner. Each episode examines the world of fringe religions and organizations, alongside their former members.

== Episodes ==
No.	Title	Original release date	Prod. code	U.S. viewers (millions)
1	"NXIVM"	May 28, 2018	102	0.89
A former recruiter for multilevel marketing self-help group NXIVM, Sarah Edmondson exposes the organization as a destructive sex cult in October 2017 and works to support the criminal prosecution of the cult's leader, Keith Raniere.
2	"Jehovah's Witnesses"	May 29, 2018	101	0.72
Former Jehovah's Witness Romy Maple, a survivor of child sexual abuse, embarks on a journey to uncover why her pleas for justice were systematically ignored by top members of the organization. Former Jehovah's Witness Bethelite Barbara Anderson reveals evidence of CSA cover-ups which she uncovered while working at the world headquarters of Jehovah's Witnesses.
3	"Children of God"	June 5, 2018	106	0.51
Amy Bril recounts her childhood growing up in the Children of God, a group notorious for pedophilia and religious prostitution; Amy and others born and raised in the group band together to address a suicide epidemic among fellow survivors.
4	"U.N.O.I."	June 12, 2018	103	0.51
Forced into child labor, physical abuse and squalid living conditions while growing up in the United Nation of Islam, Elijah Muhammad seeks justice for himself and the other children abused by UNOI and the teachings of its leader, Royall Jenkins.
5	"World Peace and Unification Sanctuary"	June 19, 2018	107	0.45
Former "Moonie" Teddy Hose attempts to alert the public to a gun-obsessed Unification Church offshoot known as the Sanctuary Church of Newfoundland, Penn., which preaches an extreme gospel and guns at the center of worship.
6	"Twelve Tribes"	June 26, 2018	104	0.45
Despite their hippie persona and rustic community businesses, the Twelve Tribes stand accused of abusing children and subjugating women; disconnected from her family, ex-member Samie Brosseau works to expose the organization's abusive practices.
7	"FLDS"	July 3, 2018	105	0.45
Many believed that when Warren Jeffs was sentenced to life in prison for child sexual assault, the problems within the FLDS community would be solved; instead, devoted followers are forced to fend for themselves in a world they were taught to fear.
8	"The Survivors Speak Part 1"	July 15, 2018	108	0.51
Former members of different groups meet to discuss their shared experiences with Elizabeth Vargas.
9	"The Survivors Speak Part 2"	July 22, 2018	109	0.38
Former members of different groups meet to discuss their shared experiences with Elizabeth Vargas.
