= America's Most Musical Family =

American musical reality competition television series

- Genre: Reality music competition
- Directed by: Julia Knowles
- Presented by: Nick Lachey
- Judges: Ciara; David Dobrik; Debbie Gibson
- Country of origin: United States
- Original language: English
- No. of seasons: 1
- No. of episodes: 13

Production
- Executive producers: Eli Holzman; Aaron Saidman; Jeff Boggs; Claire Kosloff; Ciara; Monte Lipman; Wendy Goldstein; Rob Bagshaw; Paul J. Medford; Tommy Rasera
- Producers: Shelby Barnett; Chris Chelko; Grace Douglas; Alexandra Hutson; Hayden T. Mauk; Jessica Molina; Adam Raia; Abrah Shapiro; Erin Dellorso; Katie Franzeo; Anthony Girard; Felipe Castillo
- Production locations: Earl Carroll Theatre, Hollywood, Los Angeles, California
- Cinematography: Steve Lopez; Bill Palmer
- Editors: Taylor Greathead; Chung Nguyen
- Camera setup: Multi-camera
- Running time: 44 minutes
- Production companies: The Intellectual Property Corporation; Republic Records; Nickelodeon Productions

Original release
- Network: Nickelodeon
- Release: November 1, 2019 – January 17, 2020

America's Most Musical Family is an American reality music competition television program that aired on Nickelodeon from November 1, 2019, to January 17, 2020. The program features 30 talented families competing for a record contract with Republic Records and a $250,000 cash prize. The Melisizwe Brothers were announced as the winning band of the series.

== Production ==
On February 14, 2019, it was announced that Nickelodeon was developing a reality competition television series under the working title of America's Most Musical Family. On July 25, 2019, Nick Lachey was announced as the host of the program, while Ciara, David Dobrik, and Debbie Gibson as judges on the program. The program consisted of 12 episodes, as well as a special episode. Production on the program began in Los Angeles in July 2019. On October 2, 2019, it was announced that the program would premiere on November 1, 2019.

== Episodes ==
No.	Title	Original release date	Prod. code	U.S. viewers (millions)
1	"Episode 1"	November 1, 2019	104	0.54
(The Rees Family) "Walking on Sunshine"—Katrina and the Waves; (WanMor) "It's So Hard to Say Goodbye to Yesterday"—Boyz II Men; (The Juat Sibs) "Honeymoon Avenue"—Ariana Grande; (Juna N Joey) "Beautiful Crazy"—Luke Combs; (The Mitchells) "We Got the Beat"—The Go-Go's
2	"Episode 2"	November 8, 2019	102	0.46
(The Harris Brothers) "Are You Gonna Go My Way"—Lenny Kravitz; (The Casey Family) "My Church"—Maren Morris; (The Brown-Alexander Family) "Problem"—Ariana Grande feat. Iggy Azalea; (The Maughon Siblings) "Story of My Life"—One Direction; (The Next Generation Leahy) "Better When I'm Dancin'"—Meghan Trainor
3	"Episode 3"	November 15, 2019	103	0.54
(Family Prōch) "Viva la Vida"—Coldplay; (Heichel Sisters) "All About That Bass"—Meghan Trainor; (The Schwenke Family) "Price Tag"—Jessie J feat. B.o.B.; (The Bomparts) "Hallelujah"—Pentatonix; (Rivera Duo) "Still Into You"—Paramore
4	"Episode 4"	November 22, 2019	106	0.54
(The Sanchez Family) "Turn the Beat Around"—Gloria Estefan; (The Johnson Family) "Old Town Road"—Lil Nas X & "Meant to Be"—Bebe Rexha feat. Florida Georgia Line; (The Hope Brothers) "Some Days You Gotta Dance"—The Ranch; (The Tonga Family) "Never Enough"—Loren Allred; (The Schultz Family) "Finesse"—Bruno Mars
5	"Episode 5"	November 29, 2019	101	0.59
(Lucero Garcia) "Granada"—Agustín Lara; (The Smith Kids) "Feel It Still"—Portugal. The Man & "Sucker"—Jonas Brothers; (The Keller Family) "Blown Away"—Carrie Underwood; (Christiansen) "Without Me"—Halsey; (Mathis Family) "Brother"—Needtobreathe
6	"Episode 6"	December 6, 2019	105	0.41
(The Dutton Family) "Thunder"—Imagine Dragons; (Ava & Lily) "What If I Never Get Over You"—Lady Antebellum; (Harris 3) "All Star"—Smash Mouth; (The McCormick Family) "Just the Way You Are"—Bruno Mars; (The Melisizwe Brothers) "All of Me"—John Legend
7	"Semifinals, Part 1"	December 13, 2019	107	0.34
(The Harris Brothers) "Ain't It Fun"—Paramore; (Heichel Sisters) "Everybody (Backstreet's Back)"—Backstreet Boys; (The Rees Family) "Soul Man"—Sam & Dave; (The Bomparts) "Maybe"—from Annie; (Ava & Lily) "Ex's & Oh's"—Elle King; (The Melisizwe Brothers) "Water Runs Dry"—Boyz II Men
8	"Semifinals, Part 2"	December 20, 2019	108	0.38
(The Smith Kids) "Believer"—Imagine Dragons; (WanMor) "Cool It Now"—New Edition; (The Tonga Family) "The Middle"—Zedd, Maren Morris and Grey; (The Next Generation Leahy) "Just Got Paid"—Sigala, Ella Eyre and Meghan Trainor; (The Sanchez Family) "Havana"—Camila Cabello; (Mathis Family) "Rise Up"—Andra Day
9	"Recap Special"	December 27, 2019	113	0.50
10	"Finals, Part 1"	January 3, 2020	109	0.65
(The Sanchez Family) "Girls Just Want to Have Fun"—Cyndi Lauper; (The Smith Kids) "Stitches"—Shawn Mendes; (The Melisizwe Brothers) "Waiting on the World to Change"—John Mayer; (The Rees Family) "Take On Me"—A-ha; (Mathis Family) "Ain't No Mountain High Enough"—Marvin Gaye and Tammi Terrell; (The Bomparts) "Sweet Dreams (Are Made of This)"—Eurythmics
11	"Finals, Part 2"	January 10, 2020	110	0.55
(The Rees Family) "Shut Up and Dance"—Walk the Moon; (The Melisizwe Brothers) "Let It Go"—James Bay; (The Bomparts) "If I Were a Boy"—Beyoncé; (The Sanchez Family) "Break Free"—Ariana Grande feat. Zedd; (Mathis Family) "Hey Brother"—Avicii
12	"Finals, Part 3"	January 17, 2020	111	0.51
(The Melisizwe Brothers) "Brave"—Sara Bareilles; (The Rees Family) "Twist and Shout"—The Beatles; (Mathis Family) "Speechless"—Dan + Shay; (The Sanchez Family) "Party in the U.S.A."—Miley Cyrus
13	"Finale"	January 17, 2020	112	0.46
Group Number: "High Hopes"—Panic! at the Disco: (The Rees Family) "We Are Family"—Sister Sledge; (The Melisizwe Brothers) "7 Years"—Lukas Graham; (The Sanchez Family) "On the Floor"—Jennifer Lopez feat. Pitbull & "Level Up"—Ciara

== Ratings ==
Viewership and ratings per season of America's Most Musical Family
Season	Episodes	First aired		Last aired		Avg. viewers (millions)
Season	Episodes	Date	Viewers (millions)	Date	Viewers (millions)	Avg. viewers (millions)
1	13	November 1, 2019	0.54	January 17, 2020	0.46	0.50
