= Cooking with Paris =

American reality cooking show

- Genre: Reality; Cooking show
- Created by: Paris Hilton
- Starring: Paris Hilton
- Country of origin: United States
- Original language: English
- No. of seasons: 1
- No. of episodes: 6

Production
- Executive producers: Paris Hilton; Aaron Saidman; Eli Holzman; Rebecca Hertz
- Running time: 22–26 minutes
- Production companies: Slivington Manor Entertainment; The Intellectual Property Corporation

Original release
- Network: Netflix
- Release: August 4, 2021

Cooking with Paris is an American six-part reality cooking show presented by Paris Hilton. It was released on August 4, 2021, on Netflix. In January 2022, Netflix cancelled the series after its first season.

== Premise ==
An unscripted cooking series filmed in her home, Cooking with Paris follows Hilton tackling new recipes and "unusual kitchen appliances". Each episode guest stars one of her celebrity friends, with the final episode featuring both Kathy and Nicky Hilton.

== Cast ==
- Paris Hilton as host

Guests

- Kim Kardashian
- Nikki Glaser
- Demi Lovato
- Saweetie
- Lele Pons
- Kathy Hilton
- Nicky Hilton Rothschild

== Episodes ==
No.	Title	Guest(s)	Original release date
1	"Breakfast in the Clouds"	Kim Kardashian	August 4, 2021
2	"Taco Night"	Saweetie	August 4, 2021
3	"Vegan Burgers and Fries"	Nikki Glaser	August 4, 2021
4	"Italian Night"	Demi Lovato	August 4, 2021
5	"Get Over It Holiday Feast"	Lele Pons	August 4, 2021
6	"Family Steak Night"	Kathy Hilton & Nicky Hilton Rothschild	August 4, 2021

== Production ==
On July 27, 2021, Netflix announced a six-part reality cooking series presented by Paris Hilton, following a viral YouTube video Hilton posted in January 2020, which showed her cooking a homemade lasagna. The show is executive produced by Hilton for Slivington Manor Entertainment, and Aaron Saidman, Eli Holzman, and Rebecca Hertz for The Intellectual Property Corporation. On January 17, 2022, Netflix canceled the series after one season.

== Release ==
On July 27, 2021, Netflix released a trailer for Cooking with Paris. On August 4, 2021, the platform released the series.

== Reception ==
Cooking with Paris received mostly negative reviews from critics. On the review aggregator website Rotten Tomatoes, it has an approval rating of 29% based on 21 reviews, with the consensus, "Cooking with Paris has the potential to delight, but by stranding Hilton's persona so deep in her past it feels like a missed opportunity for her to begin something new." Metacritic, which uses a weighted average, assigned a score of 34 out of 100 based on 10 critics, indicating "generally unfavorable reviews". The series ranked at number one (tied with Alter Ego) on Metacritic's Worst TV Shows of 2021 list.

Jordan Julian of The Daily Beast stated that the show is "an over-produced miss. [...] She seems to be trying to channel her clueless, perpetually bored Simple Life persona, but now that we know that that was just a character, it feels forced." Writing for Variety, Daniel D'Addario said: "The problem, for Hilton, is that Cooking With Paris is a disaster — an utterly unappealing sit that many viewers will tune out before the first episode has ended." Lucy Mangan of The Guardian felt that it "all gets odder as it goes on. It's not (just) that Hilton has only four phrases at her disposal ('So good', 'So bomb', 'Insane', 'So cute'), but that she is such a deadening presence."

Despite the critical response, Cooking with Paris briefly entered Netflix's Top 10 rankings in a number of territories, and earned Hilton the Best Reality Return at the 2022 MTV Movie and TV Awards.
