= Mystery Millionaire =

- Starring: Greg Plitt; Vito Guido Glazers; Brett R. Miller
- Country of origin: United States
- Original language: English

Production
- Executive producer: Eli Holzman

Original release
- Network: WE tv
- Release: 2014 – 2014

Mystery Millionaire is a 2014 American reality television series.

== Overview ==
Wealthy singles who have been unlucky in their love lives keep their success secret on this reality television dating program. Produced by Eli Holzman.
