= The Climb (2023 TV show) =

Reality television series

The Climb is an 8-episode reality TV series that pits 10 amateur climbers against each other in multiple climbing scenarios and styles. The winner receives $100,000 USD and a $100,000 USD sponsorship from outdoor gear producer, prAna. The show stars professional rock climbers Chris Sharma and Meagan Martin and featured actor Jason Momoa.

== Development ==
Momoa met Sharma in the mid-1990's while boulder climbing at Hueco Tanks, TX. The Climb is a collaboration between Sharma, Momoa's production company, On the Roam, and the Intellectual Property Corporation. HBO Max greenlit The Climb in July, 2021. Climbing locations included Mallorca, Wadi Rum, and Barcelona.

== Season 1 ==
Season 1 aired on HBO Max in January, 2023. The ten episodes featured amateur climbers Robyn Ragins, Cat Runner, Alice Hafer, Dominique (Dom) Barry, Tiffany Soithongsuk, Andre (Deco) Braga, Bradford (Brad) Burns, Mario Stanley, Maiza Lima, and April Welch. Cat Runner won the grand prize after outclimbing Dom Barry.

Episode Number	Name	Original Air Date	Location	Climb Type	Eliminated
1	Deep Water Solo	January 12, 2023	Majorca, Spain	Deep Water Solo	April Welch
2	The Precipice	January 12, 2023	Majorca, Spain	Free Climb	Maiza Lima
3	High Ball	January 12, 2023	Albarracin, Spain	Bouldering	Mario Stanley
4	The Cave	January 19, 2023	Albarracin, Spain	Free Climb	Brad Burns
5	First Ascent	January 19, 2023	Wadi Rum, Jordan	Free Climb	Tiffany Soithongsuk; Deco Braga
6	The Crack	January 19, 2023	Wadi Rum, Jordan	Crack	Alice Hafer
7	The Spire	January 26, 2023	Barcelona, Spain	Multi-pitch	Robyn Ragins
8	El Diablo	January 26, 2023	Majorca, Spain	Deep Water Solo	Dom Barry

== Reception ==
Season 1 was criticized on climbing websites for various reasons, including: choice of climbing destinations; rating of difficulty of climbs; editing the video footage of climbs; placement of anchors; the presentation to the audience of how difficult/easy climbing is; and when climbers chastised Deco for not finishing a climb after realizing he had qualified. However, the show was also praised for things like: presenting many different types of climbing; blending a competition with an easy-to-watch-and-understand TV show; showing the camaraderie between climbers; and showcasing Chris Sharma.

Although Momoa appeared in each episode, it was noted that he wasn't present during the climbs due to the need for hernia surgery.
