= Mind Field =

Documentary web television series on neuropsychology

- Genre: Education; Science
- Created by: Michael Stevens
- Presented by: Michael Stevens
- Theme music composer: Jake Chudnow
- Opening theme: "Atlas"
- Composers: Jake Chudnow; Russell Spurlock
- Country of origin: United States
- Original language: English
- No. of seasons: 3
- No. of episodes: 26

Production
- Executive producers: Michael Stevens; Eli Holzman; Aaron Saidman; Claire Kosloff; David Wechter; Johnny Fountain; Nathan Oliver
- Producers: Phillip Barbb; Travis Dowell; Jen Friesen; Andy Wood
- Cinematography: Matthew Novello
- Editors: Gerry Becerril; John French; Anita Hadulla; Petey Hentrich; Tom Munden; Jesse Soff
- Camera setup: Andrew Burks
- Running time: 21–34 minutes
- Production companies: Vsauce; The Intellectual Property Corporation

Original release
- Network: YouTube Premium
- Release: January 18, 2017 – October 24, 2019

Mind Field is an American television series produced exclusively for YouTube Premium, created and presented by Michael Stevens, the creator of the YouTube channel Vsauce. The format of the series is based heavily on that of Vsauce, with Stevens presenting documentary-style episodes which focus on aspects of human behavior, particularly the brain and the influences of consciousness. Every episode contains one or more experiments, in which either volunteers or Stevens himself participates, that relates to the topic of the episode. For example, in episode one, Stevens locks himself in an empty room for three days in order to investigate the effects of social isolation on the brain.

Three seasons of Mind Field have been released on Vsauce, each one with eight episodes. The first season ran in early 2017, the second season from late 2017 to early 2018, and the third from late 2018 to early 2019. On October 1, 2019, all episodes became watchable with ads for free for those without YouTube Premium. On October 24, 2019, a special episode entitled "What Is the Scariest Thing?" was released.

== Episodes ==
=== Season 1 (2017) ===
No.	Title	Original release date
1	"Isolation"	January 18, 2017
Stevens explores the effects of isolation and boredom on the brain including staying three days in a room with no external stimuli.
2	"Conformity"	January 18, 2017
Stevens explores the human instinct to conform and fall in with the crowd including conducting an experiment on individuals when actors give the wrong answer to questions.
3	"Destruction"	January 25, 2017
Can destroying things really make someone calm down? Stevens investigates including making people agitated and then giving them objects to destroy, and comparing them with a control.
4	"Artificial Intelligence"	February 1, 2017
Stevens attempts to find out where the line between real and artificial minds really lies.
5	"Freedom of Choice"	February 8, 2017
Stevens is joined by Moran Cerf, Dianna Cowern and Derek Muller to investigate whether we really have control over our own thoughts and actions, or is someone or something else calling the shots?
6	"Touch"	February 15, 2017
Stevens investigates whether it is really our bodies or our minds that determine the way we interpret and feel sensations.
7	"In Your Face"	February 22, 2017
Stevens explores the effects of facial expressions on interactions with others and with yourself, and whether moods determine facial expressions or the other way around.
8	"Do You Know Yourself?"	March 1, 2017
Stevens investigates how well memories can be easily manipulated, and how this impacts people's lives.

=== Season 2 (2017–18) ===
No.	Title	Original release date
1	"The Greater Good"	December 6, 2017
Stevens conducts a trolley problem experiment.
2	"The Psychedelic Experience"	December 6, 2017
Stevens travels to the Amazonian jungle of Peru to experience the mind-expanding effects of the psychedelic brew Ayahuasca.
3	"Interrogation"	December 6, 2017
Stevens consults experts on the topic of interrogation and manipulation. Stevens tries his best not to spill out two important details (his sister's name and about his job) while the officer interrogates him by giving him slight doses of drugs. The amount of drugs is increased until Michael finally tells the truth.
4	"Your Brain on Tech"	December 6, 2017
Stevens takes part in a study at the University of California, Irvine, where scientists test how playing 3D video games affects spatial memory.
5	"How to Make a Hero"	December 13, 2017
Stevens studies how people respond to unethical orders or jobs, and later tests Heroic Imagination Project students on heroism and the bystander effect.
6	"The Power of Suggestion"	December 17, 2017
Stevens participates in McGill University's groundbreaking study of an accessory-assisted placebo.
7	"Divergent Minds"	December 27, 2017
Stevens speaks with Derek Paravicini, a savant pianist, and explores how damage to the brain can lead to discoveries about its function.
8	"The Electric Brain"	January 3, 2018
Stevens studies the effect of electricity on the brain, and how it can help paralyzed patients recover mobility and communication.

=== Season 3 (2018–19) ===
No.	Title	Original release date
1	"The Cognitive Tradeoff Hypothesis"	December 5, 2018
Stevens examines how chimpanzees' short-term memory is far more detailed than that of humans.
2	"Moral Licensing"	December 5, 2018
Stevens examines self-licensing.
3	"The Stilwell Brain"	December 12, 2018
Stevens visits his hometown (Stilwell, Kansas) and demonstrates how a brain processes visual information with the residents sending information to each other.
4	"The Stanford Prison Experiment"	December 19, 2018
Stevens talks about and studies the infamous experiment conducted by Philip Zimbardo and conducts his own experiment with similar variables but a less intimidating context.
5	"Should I Die?"	December 26, 2018
Stevens talks with Caitlin Doughty about death and visits a facility that preserves bodies.
6	"How to Talk to Aliens"	January 2, 2019
Stevens examined the ways to communicate with the extraterrestrial beings.
7	"Behavior and Belief"	January 9, 2019
Stevens conducts a game show demonstrating Our Beliefs that connects a happening in the World and discusses about human Superstition.
8	"Mind Reading"	January 16, 2019
Stevens participates in an experiment that involves figuring out what people are thinking, and also talks with researchers who are conducting experiments to read people's dreams.

=== Special episodes (2018-2019) ===
No.	Title	Original release date
1	"The Origins of Disgust"	December 5, 2018
In a clip that ultimately did not make it to the season 3 episode "the Cognitive Tradeoff Hypothesis", Stevens explores whether disgust is an evolutionary product as he, alongside Dr. Andrew Macintosh and Cecile Sarabian, experiment with Japanese macaques to see if they are repulsed by feces.
2	"I Watch 3 Episodes of Mind Field With Our Experts & Researchers"	October 14, 2019
Stevens watches S2-E6 ("The Power of Suggestion"), S3-E5 ("Should I Die?"), and S2-E4 ("Your Brain on Tech") with various experts on the subjects.
3	"What Is the Scariest Thing?"	October 24, 2019
Stevens talks about fear and if there exists an innate fear of which all people are afraid.
