= Mel B: It's a Scary World =

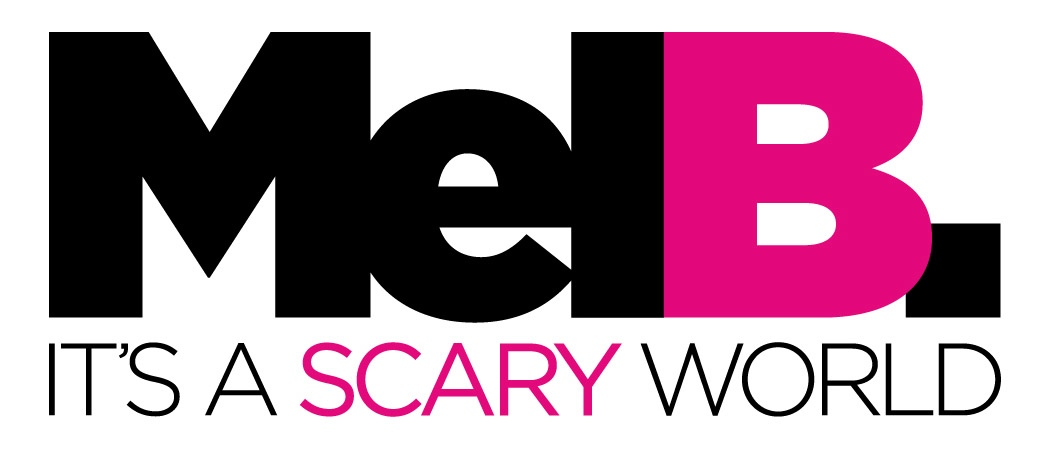
- Genre: Reality
- Created by: Mel B; Stephen Stansbury
- Starring: Melanie Brown; Stephen Stansbury; Phoenix Gulzar; Angel Murphy; Giselle Belafonte; Madison Belafonte
- Country of origin: United States
- Original language: English
- No. of seasons: 1
- No. of episodes: 10

Production
- Executive producers: Eli Holzman; Melanie Brown; Merah Chung; Sarah Weidman; Stephen Belafonte; Stephen Lambert; Todd Hurvitz
- Camera setup: Single-camera
- Running time: 22–24 minutes
- Production company: Studio Lambert

Original release
- Network: Style Network
- Release: September 5 – October 7, 2010

Mel B: It's a Scary World is an American reality television series starring English singer Mel B. It debuted on Style Network on September 5, 2010. The show's title is a play on Brown's nickname from when she was part of the Spice Girls, "Scary Spice".

== Series background ==
The series follows the life of British singer/actress/television personality Mel B and her blended family as they deal with Brown's daily life as entertainer, businesswoman, wife and mother. The series is being done in a hybrid docu-comedy type format.

== Cast ==
=== The family ===
- Mel B - (Stephen's wife at the time), Phoenix, Angel and Madison's mother, stepmother to Giselle; Well known singer.
- Stephen Belafonte - Melanie's husband/business manager (at the time); father to Madison and Giselle, stepfather to Phoenix and Angel.
- Phoenix Chi Gulzar - Melanie's first daughter.
- Angel Iris Murphy Brown - Melanie's second daughter.
- Giselle Belafonte - Stephen's daughter from a previous relationship and Melanie's step-daughter.

=== Celebrity guest stars ===
- Robin Antin
- The Pussycat Dolls (burlesque revue)
- Eddie Murphy
- Damon Elliott
- Ludacris
- Kim Kardashian
- Jay Sean
- Natasha Bedingfield

== Critical reception ==
In an interview with the Futon Critic, Brown notes that what viewers will see is what they really do in real life everyday: "I have a job and my husband has a job so they were just following us around. It's not like we had to make anything up or we had to act. It was actually quite easy, to be honest. The kids thoroughly enjoyed it. It was just a very natural thing to do."

However, Media Life television critic Tom Conroy had a different take on the show: "Anyone who watches "Mel B: It's a Scary World" will wish Mel the best of luck in her quest to add something memorable to her résumé, but this show isn't it."

== Episodes ==
No.	Title	Original release date
1	"Mel B: Spice Mom"	September 5, 2010
Mel must deal with trying out with the Pussycat Dolls and with her feelings towards Eddie Murphy after he invites Angel to a movie premiere. U.S. Viewers: The pilot episode scored 0.304 million viewers
2	"The Great Cake Mistake"	September 12, 2010
When Phoenix graduates from elementary school, Mel reminds her that she is not only responsible for planning her big party, but must also help her shop for the perfect graduation dress. At the same time, Mel is also asked to co-host "The Daily 10" on E!, and she has to juggle multiple business meetings with Bravada, all of which is causing her to spend less time with Stephen, who is hoping that they would have a romantic evening together.
3	"Sink or Swim"	September 19, 2010
As Mel prepaares for a 10K charity run in which she must find a way to get Stephen to participate, she must also juggle with the exhausting process of making a workout video game and teaching Angel how to swim.
4	"Love Is Scary"	September 26, 2010
Mel plays matchmaker for her friend Matt Goss, while she chaperones 11-year-old Phoenix's first date with a boy, which goes awry.
5	"Vegas Is the Spice of Life"	October 3, 2010
Stephen plans a trip to Las Vegas to help finalize a business deal, but when Mel gets a chance to work on her new single with music producer Damon Elliott, she'll need to figure out a way manage her other commitments as well. Meanwhile Phoenix sneaks out the hotel room to venture on her own.
6	"Chasing Ludacris"	October 10, 2010
In an effort to give her new album a boost, Mel wants Ludacris to appear on her single, but she'll need to convince him that she's more than just a "Spice Girl". Meanwhile, Phoenix pays the price after she's caught walking on the roof with a playmate, prompting Mel to lay down the law and make her pay by taking jobs as punishment.
7	"Don't H8 Mel"	October 17, 2010
Mel has to make a tough decision between her business and her beliefs when she agrees to a PSA, then questions whether to keep Blair on as her stylist when he fails to show up for an important shoot.
8	"Fashion Nightmare"	October 24, 2010
Mel and designer, Charlotte Spaare are ready to sell their new line, but first they'll need to convince the stores to carry it. Angel's nightmares become an issue for everyone.
9	"Cupcakes & Kardashians"	November 7, 2010
Mel and Stephen have a bake-off to create the Mel B signature cupcake. Stephen scratches the SUV but tries to fix it before Mel sees it. Mel does charity work with Kim Kardashian.
10	"Mel's Big Show"	November 7, 2010
Mel is asked to guest perform at a Jay Sean show but she only has 5 days to pull everything together. Mel is unsure if she can still handle a budding solo career and motherhood, which comes to a boil when she misses her period and fears that she might be pregnant again. At the end of the episode she learns from Stephen that he is ready to have a child with Mel, but she is not so sure if she wants to have another child because of her priorities. Mel performs "Lip Lock", which featured Ludacris' guest rap vocals.
