= Belfor =

Multinational corporation

BELFOR Property Restoration
- Type: Private
- Industry: Property restoration Disaster recovery
- Founded: 1946; 80 years ago
- Headquarters: Birmingham, Michigan, U.S.
- Area served: Worldwide
- Key people: Sheldon Yellen (CEO); Mike Yellen (COO)
- Revenue: Not Available
- Website: belfor.com

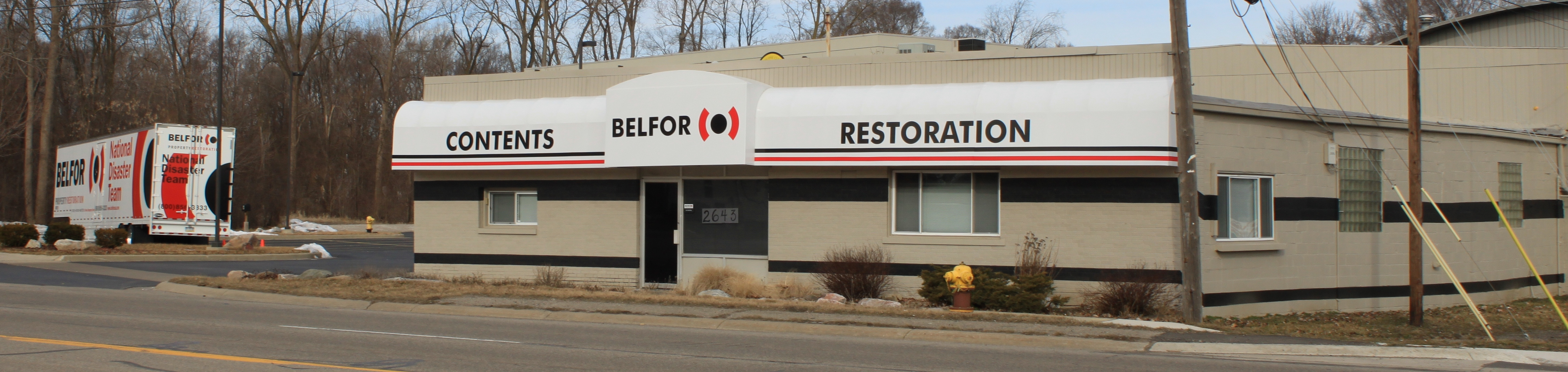
Belfor branch office, Ypsilanti, Michigan

BELFOR Property Restoration is an American multinational disaster recovery and property restoration company, based in Birmingham, Michigan.

== History ==
BELFOR began as a Quality Awnings & Construction company in Dearborn, Michigan in 1946. The company changed its name to INRECON L.L.C. (for Insurance Reconstruction) in 1981. Taylor, Michigan-based Masco bought 25 percent of the company in 1997, and completed its purchase of INRECON in 1999.

Haniel EnviroServices, a new division of the old European conglomerate Haniel, began in Germany in 1980. Its name was changed to Belfor in 1998.

Masco sold INRECON to Haniel in 2001 and it became part of BELFOR. At the time, the company had annual sales of $180 million and employed 1,000 staff.

As of February 2019, Belfor Holdings Inc. was in discussions regarding a potential sale to the American Securities equity firm. These were concluded successfully in April 2019.

== United States of America operations ==
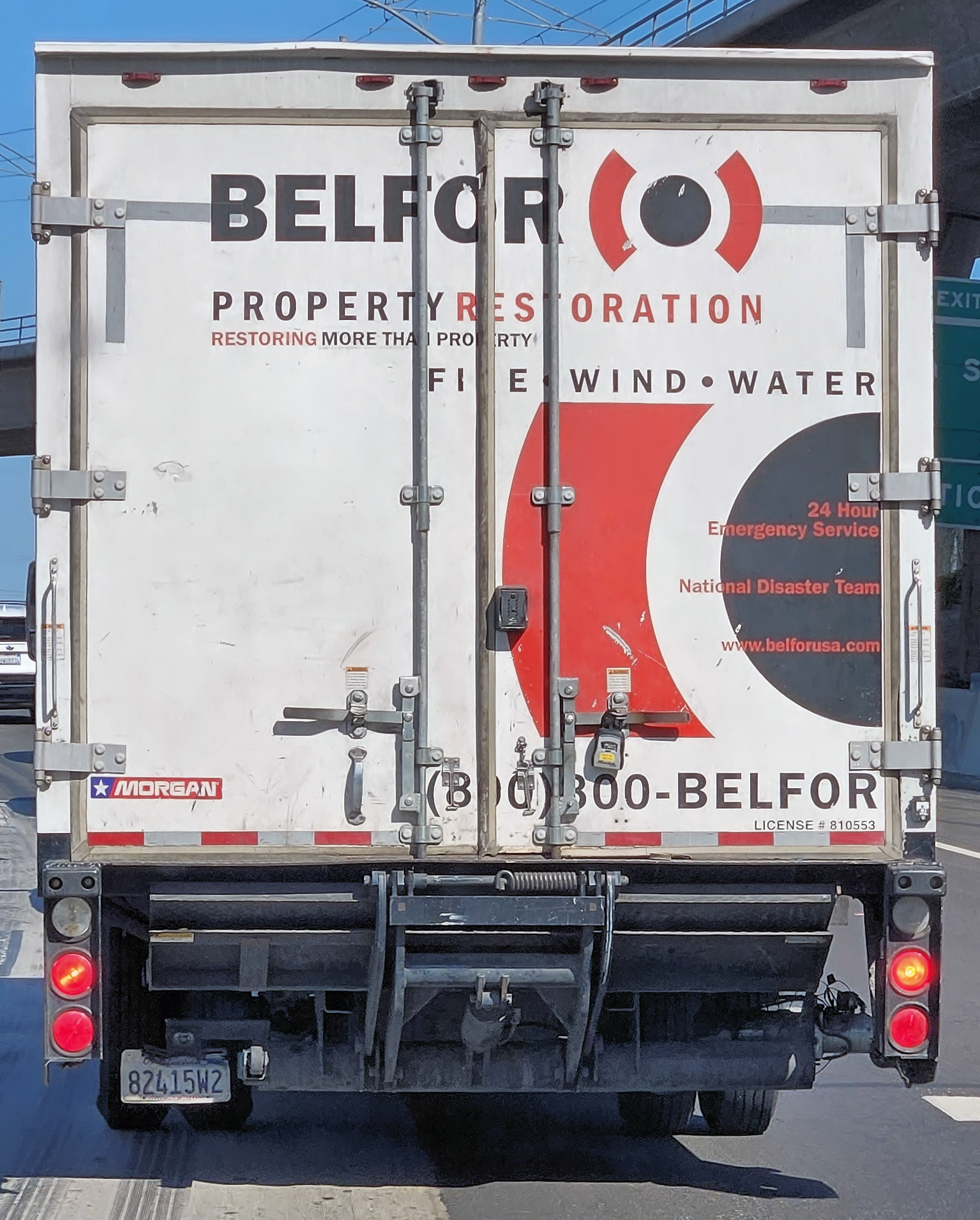
Belfor repair truck

BELFOR USA Group Inc, doing business as BELFOR Property Restoration, is based in Birmingham, Michigan and provides integrated disaster recovery and property restoration services. Belfor USA Group Inc. operates as a subsidiary of BELFOR Europe GmbH.

In 2007, BELFOR USA acquired Ductz International, LLC, an air duct cleaning and HVAC restoration franchise network with locations in 22 states. It acquired Hawaii Restorative Services of Honolulu and Coach's Catastrophe in 2010. BELFOR acquired BAMCOR in 2015.

BELFOR opened an office in Corpus Christi, Texas, and a San Antonio office in 2016. As of that year, BELFOR globally had 7000 employees.

== Projects ==
In 2003, the Canadian branch of BELFOR worked to recover 100,000 books and manuscripts in the 17th-century Khan Collection at the Urdu Research Library of the Sundarayya Vignana Kendram, as a result of flood damage following record rains in Hyderabad in August 2000. The company was employed in Houston after Tropical Storm Allison in 2001, which caused damage to Jones Hall, the Wortham Theater Center, and the Alley Theater, with the loss of musical scores, ballet costumes and musical instruments, including three Steinway concert grand pianos.

In 2004, after Hurricane Ivan, BELFOR (UK) and BELFOR (Canada) performed thermal vacuum freeze trying to restore more than 4,000 boxes of documents, half of the vital records in the Cayman Islands National Archives. After Hurricane Katrina in 2005, BELFOR helped fulfill Tulane's campus-wide emergency plan, which included the "Landmark Undertaking" of the Tulane Libraries Recovery Center.

Other projects included recovery from the Chile earthquake and the 2012 Super Storm Sandy.

== Awards ==
- 2012, RIA Phoenix Award; BELFOR Rebuilds UGI Headquarters
- 2013, Chrysalis Award, Residential Insurance Restoration; BELFOR helps family redesign their home after a devastating fire
- 2015, Chrysalis Award, Commercial Insurance Restoration; Restores Gallo Center for the Arts after a water damage
- 2016, Chrysalis National Award -Commercial Insurance Restoration; Restoring the historic Hanford Fox Theatre
- 2016, RIA Phoenix Award, Odessa Hospital; Award for innovations in restoration
