= Hayley Taylor (presenter) =

English television presenter (born 1967)

- Born: Hayley Elaine Wigglesworth; 7 February 1967 (age 59); Wakefield, Yorkshire, England
- Occupations: Television presenter; employment expert
- Years active: 2009–present
- Television: Benefit Busters; The Fairy Jobmother
- Spouses: David Pierce (m. 1989, divorced) Wayne Ryton (m. 1991, divorced) Mark Taylor (m. 1996)
- Children: 1

Hayley Elaine Taylor (née Wigglesworth; born 7 February 1967) is an English television presenter and employment expert. After appearing in the Channel 4 documentary Benefit Busters in 2009, she went on to front her own series The Fairy Jobmother on the same network the following year, as well as an American version for Lifetime.

== Life and career ==
Taylor was born Hayley Elaine Wigglesworth on 7 February 1967 in Wakefield, Yorkshire to Jack Wigglesworth, a miner and his wife Sandra (née Prince). After leaving school at 16, Taylor enrolled in college and later became a hairdresser, and took evening classes in psychology whilst working full-time. Whilst working in a hair salon which had a training school, Taylor was asked to step in when a tutor was unwell and ultimately decided to work with unemployed learners who wanted to become hairdressers. She was married twice to David Pierce and Wayne Ryton in 1989 and 1991 respectively, both of which ended in divorce, before marrying her third husband Mark Taylor in 1996, with whom she welcomed a daughter Morgan the following year. She later became a manager of unemployed volunteers, and after two years she was asked by the training provider to come and work for their company as an employment advisor, a job she accepted and spent the next three years helping the unemployed gain employment.

In 2009, a film crew from Channel 4 arrived at the office she worked at to film training providers who delivered governmental contracts. Taylor's methods caught the eye of the production team and she ultimately featured in a three-part series titled Benefit Busters. Following the show's airing, Taylor was given her own series on the same network titled The Fairy Jobmother that began in July 2010, in which she assisted unemployed families in attempt to motivate them and get them back into employment. She discussed the commissioning of the series on BBC Breakfast. American network Lifetime subsequently commissioned a version of the show in the United States, which began in October 2010. A second series of the show was commissioned for 2011. She has also appeared on shows including The Wright Stuff, This Week and Daybreak, as well The Big Benefits Row: Live.

== Filmography ==
As herself
Year	Title	Role	Ref.
2009	Benefit Busters	Job advisor	
2010	The Fairy Jobmother	Presenter	
2010	BBC Breakfast	Guest; 1 episode	
2010	Good Morning America	Guest; 1 episode	
2010	The Fairy Jobmother U.S.	Presenter	
2011	The Wright Stuff	Guest; 1 episode	
2011	This Week	Guest; 1 episode	
2012	Daybreak	Guest; 1 episode	
2014	The Big Benefits Row: Live	"The Fairy Jobmother"	
