= Slauson Rec =

2025 documentary film about Shia LaBeouf's experimental theater collective

- Directed by: Leo Lewis O'Neil
- Produced by: Matt Zien; Kevin Knight
- Starring: Shia LaBeouf
- Cinematography: Leo Lewis O’Neil
- Edited by: Danny Smight; Kevin Klauber
- Music by: Adam Peters
- Production company: Livid Cinema
- Release date: 18 May 2025 (Cannes)
- Running time: 145 minutes
- Country: United States
- Language: English

Slauson Rec is a 2025 American documentary film directed by Leo Lewis O'Neil. It chronicles actor Shia LaBeouf’s free experimental acting collective founded in 2018 at the Slauson Recreation Center in South-Central Los Angeles, from its euphoric beginnings to an acrimonious collapse marked by LaBeouf’s volatile outbursts and physical confrontations.

The film had its world premiere in the Cannes Classics section of the 78th Cannes Film Festival on 18 May 2025, where it was nominated for the L'Œil d'or.

== Synopsis ==
In September 2018 LaBeouf posts an open invitation on Twitter (now X) for anyone with “a story that needs telling” to attend a free Saturday-morning workshop. Filmmaker Leo Lewis O’Neil, then 21, becomes the group’s self-appointed archivist, ultimately recording some 800 hours of footage.

Slauson Rec traces the collective’s evolution—from ecstatic trust exercises and a devised piece titled The New Human to pandemic-era rehearsals of a drive-in play called 5711 Avalon. As LaBeouf’s temper worsens, the film captures multiple incidents of verbal and physical abuse, including the firing of an actress days after her mother’s death and an altercation that leaves another student bruised. The group dissolves in November 2020 amid turmoil and LaBeouf’s looming legal troubles. A coda, filmed two years later, finds him acknowledging a “god complex” and expressing a desire to make amends.

== Production ==
O’Neil shot the project on a single handheld camera supplied by LaBeouf, who encouraged him to “film everything” without restriction. After the collective’s collapse, O’Neil and producer Matt Zien edited the material independently, with Danny Smight and Kevin Klauber, A.C.E., shaping the final 140-minute cut. Zien told Deadline that Cannes had been the team’s primary goal from the outset of post-production, informing festival strategy. LaBeouf never sought editorial control and insisted that uncomfortable footage remain in the film.

== Release ==
The documentary debuted on 18 May 2025 at the 78th Cannes Film Festival, screening in Cannes Classics section. LaBeouf attended the premiere alongside O’Neil, Zien and Knight. As of May 2025, a U.S. distributor had not yet been publicly announced.

== Critical response ==
Early reviews were polarised but largely praised O’Neil’s unvarnished access. Rolling Stone called the film “one of the most damning, unfiltered, take-no-prisoners portraits of a celebrity losing his [temper] ever recorded for posterity.” The Times noted that “nothing can quite prepare you for the LaBeouf featured” in what it termed a “thermonuclear rage machine” of a documentary. The Daily Telegraph awarded four stars, praising the film’s “grimly revealing” study of Hollywood power dynamics. RogerEbert.com's Zachary Lee argued that the documentary “warns against what happens to communities that cede their collective power in favor of being shaped by the ego of a sole charismatic leader.” Additional reviews described Slauson Rec as an experimental and challenging project that blurred documentary and performance boundaries. Sheri Linden of The Hollywood Reporter praised its raw realism and editing style, while noting its demanding length and shifting tone.
