= Be the Boss =

- Genre: Reality; Competition
- Country of origin: United States
- Original language: English
- No. of seasons: 1
- No. of episodes: 6

Production
- Executive producers: Aaron Saidman; Brien Meagher; Drew Tappon; Elaine Frontain Bryant; Eli Holzman; Nicole Reed; Phil Lott; Stephen Lambert; Tom Moody
- Running time: 40 to 43 minutes (excluding commercials)
- Production company: Studio Lambert

Original release
- Network: A&E
- Release: December 2, 2012 – January 6, 2013

Be The Boss is an American reality competition television series on A&E. The series debuted on December 2, 2012 and follows two employees who work for franchise-owned companies as they work their way to the top in order to own their franchise and "be the boss".

The series was intended to be a spin-off of the hit series Undercover Boss on CBS until CBS dropped the series and it was moved to A&E.

== Production ==
On August 17, 2010, it was announced that CBS had ordered an untitled Studio Lambert project for a pilot which featured "two employees who work at the same company competing against one another for a major promotion". News about the series went silent until it was announced on February 14, 2012, that the series has been picked up by A&E.

On December 7, 2012, A&E announced that the series has been moved to a late night slot at 11:00/10:00c.

== Episodes ==
No. in series	Title	Original release date	Prod. code	Viewers (millions)
1	"Complete Nutrition"	December 2, 2012	102	0.56
2	"The Melting Pot"	December 9, 2012	105	0.77
3	"Auntie Anne's"	December 16, 2012	101	N/A
4	"Molly Maid"	December 23, 2012	104	N/A
5	"Jazzercise"	December 30, 2012	106	N/A
6	"Signal 88 Security"	January 6, 2013	103	N/A
