= The Intellectual Property Corporation =

Production company

- Type: Private
- Industry: Reality television
- Founded: 2016; 10 years ago
- Founders: Eli Holzman; Aaron Saidman
- Headquarters: Van Nuys, California, U.S.
- Key people: Eli Holzman (CEO); Aaron Saidman (president)
- Parent: Sony Pictures Television Nonfiction (2018–2026)
- Website: theipcorp.com

The Intellectual Property Corporation (IPC) is a reality television and documentary production company based in Van Nuys, California founded by Eli Holzman and Aaron Saidman in 2016. IPC was owned by Sony Pictures through their Television Nonfiction division, formerly known as Industrial Media, from 2018 to 2026, before returning to being an independent company.

== History ==
IPC was founded in 2016 by producers Eli Holzman and Aaron Saidman, and funded via private equity from three investors and former collaborators Sheldon Yellen, David J. Adelman, and Michael G. Rubin. IPC develops and produces a wide range of television, film, documentary, and interactive mobile content. IPC is known for series Leah Remini: Scientology and the Aftermath, as well as series including HBO's We're Here, the YouTube Originals feature documentary This Is Paris starring Paris Hilton and Mind Field, Selena Gomez's HBO Max series Selena+Chef, the Netflix series Indian Matchmaking, Showtime's docuseries Active Shooter: America Under Fire, and Free Meek and The Last Narc for Amazon Prime Video.

In August 2018, IPC was acquired by Core Media and relaunched the studio as Industrial Media. IPC has been recognized as one of the top 100 unscripted production companies globally by Realscreen, and has received nominations and/or won Primetime Emmy Awards, PGA Awards, and News and Documentary Emmy Awards for its diverse slate of programming. Its founders, Eli Holzman and Aaron Saidman, were recognized by The Hollywood Reporter as "Top 10" members of "Reality TV's Ruling Class" in 2017, with Holzman having previously created series including Project Greenlight and Project Runway, and the duo having produced Undercover Boss.

In October 2023, Nile Cappello's production company Yes, Like the River signed an overall deal with The Intellectual Property Corporation.

In March 2026, Eli Holzman and Aaron Saidman left Sony Pictures Television Nonfiction after 4 years with SPT, taking The Intellectual Property Corporation with them.

== Productions ==
=== Television shows ===
Title	Years	Network	Notes
Leah Remini: Scientology and the Aftermath	2016–2019	A&E	
Mind Field	2017–2019	YouTube Originals	
Active Shooter: America Under Fire	2017	Showtime	
Lost Gold	2017–2019	Travel Channel	
Kingpin	2018	History Channel	
Operation Odessa	2018	Showtime	
ELEAGUE The Challenger: Street Fighter V	2018	TBS	
Sticker Shock	2018	Discovery Channel	
Cults and Extreme Belief	2018	A&E	
Price of Duty	2018	Oxygen	
Vivian	2018	Snapchat	
Fortune Fights	2019	Reelz	
This Giant Beast That is the Global Economy	2019	Amazon Prime Video	co-production with Gary Sanchez Productions and Amazon Studios
Notorious	2019	Reelz	
The Substitute	2019–2021	Nickelodeon	co-production with Alternative Plan and Nickelodeon Productions
Kids Behind Bars: Life or Parole	2019	A&E	
1989: The Year That Made Us	2019	National Geographic	co-production with National Geographic Studios
Injustice with Nancy Grace	2019–2020	Oxygen	co-production with Eureka Productions
Free Meek	2019	Amazon Prime Video	co-production with Roc Nation and Amazon Studios
America's Most Musical Family	2019–2020	Nickelodeon	co-production with Republic Records and Nickelodeon Productions
Fine Young Criminals	2019–2021	Viceland	
We're Here	2020–2024	HBO	co-production with HBO Entertainment and This is Opus 20
Indian Matchmaking	2020–present	Netflix	
The Last Narc	2020	Amazon Prime Video	co-production with Amazon Studios
Selena + Chef	2020–2023	HBO Max/Food Network	co-production with July Moon Productions
Empires of New York	2020	CNBC	co-production with Fairhaven Films
Night Stalker: The Hunt for a Serial Killer	2021	Netflix	
How To: Olympics	2021	YouTube Originals	
Cooking with Paris	2021	Netflix	co-production with Silvington Manor Entertainment
The D'Amelio Show	2021–2023	Hulu	co-production with The D'Amelios
12 Hours With	2021	Facebook Watch	co-production with Billboard
The Curse of Von Dutch	2021	Hulu	
Restaurant Rivals: Irvine vs. Taffer	2022	Discovery+	
Secrets of Playboy	2022–2023	A&E	
Death in the Dorms	2023–2024	Hulu	co-production with ABC News Studios and Yes, Like the River
RapCaviar Presents	2023	Hulu	co-production with Spotify
The Climb	2023	Max	co-production with On the Roam
Swiping America	2023	Max	co-production with House of Opus 20
United States of Scandal with Jake Tapper	2024	CNN	
Patti Stanger: The Matchmaker	2024	The CW	co-production with Mainstay Entertainment and Patti Stanger Entertainment
H! Wood Show	2024	Hulu	
Selena + Restaurant	2024	Food Network	co-production with July Moon Productions
Expedition from Hell: The Lost Tapes	2024	Discovery Channel	co-production with Wrigley Media Group
House of Horror: Secrets of College Greek Life	2024	A&E	
A Plan to Kill	2024	Oxygen	
The Wonderland Massacre & the Secret History of Hollywood	2024	MGM+	co-production with MGM+ Studios, Miziker Entertainment and Hyeronimus Pictures
Second Chance Stage	2024	Max	
Scam Goddess	2025–present	Freeform	co-production with ABC News Studios
With Love, Meghan	2025–present	Netflix	co-production with Archewell Productions
Power Moves with Shaquille O'Neal	2025	Netflix	co-production with Jersey Legends Productions
The Fixer	2025–present	Fox	co-production with Marcus Entertainment
The Hillside Strangler	2026	MGM+	
Clue	2027	Netflix	co-production with B17 Entertainment and Hasbro Entertainment

=== Specials ===
Title	Year	Notes
Truth & Lies: The Crocodile of Wall Street?	2022	co-production with ABC News Studios

=== Feature films ===
Title	Year	Notes
The Swamp	2020	co-production with HBO Documentary Films
This Is Paris	2020	
Our American Family	2021	co-production with World of Ha Productions and Atlas Industries
