= Make Me a Millionaire Inventor =

- Genre: Documentary; Reality
- Starring: George Zaidan; Deanne Bell
- Country of origin: United States
- Original language: English
- No. of seasons: 2
- No. of episodes: 14

Production
- Executive producers: Eli Holzman; Jimmy Fox; Nick Parnes
- Camera setup: Multiple
- Running time: 60 minutes (inc. adverts)
- Production company: Objective Productions/All3Media

Original release
- Network: CNBC
- Release: August 12, 2015 – December 1, 2016

Make Me a Millionaire Inventor is an American television docu-series which airs on CNBC, and has been called "a sort-of Mythbusters-meets-Shark-Tank mashup." The show's two hosts, George Zaidan and Deanne Bell, are "on a mission to find the best inventions NEVER made and give them new life." Each episode features Zaidan and Bell (a chemist/advisor and mechanical engineer, respectively) teaming up with two sets of inventors who have "hit a brick wall," to help them prepare their inventions for a pitch to potential investors who can help take them to market.

The original version of the show aired in the UK in 2013 on Sky Vision, and the rights to the show were sold to a number of other providers worldwide.

== Broadcast ==
The series premiered in America on CNBC on August 12, 2015, with episodes airing every Wednesday. A second season launched on October 6, 2016.

== Episodes ==
=== Series overview ===
Season	Episodes	Originally released	
Season	Episodes	First released	Last released
1	6	August 12, 2015	September 16, 2015
2	8	October 6, 2016	December 1, 2016

=== Season 1 (2015) ===
No. overall	No. in season	Title	Original release date	U.S. viewers
1	1	"Failure to Launch"	August 12, 2015	353,000
Samantha DeMaria seeks a deal for her "Marinara Tower," and Anthony Gonzalez and Bob Merriman look to improve the safety of sports with the "Fit Guard."
2	2	"Ahead of the Pack"	August 19, 2015	399,000
Shane and Maria Freeman look for funding for the "Sno Cone Kiosk," and four skateboarding friends from Encinitas, CA look to take their protective "Skull Cap" to market.
3	3	"Icing on the Cake"	August 26, 2015	344,000
Ralph and Stephen Haney look to make "Glo Blades" a hit on the ice, and Travis Zinger wants to see his "SweetBot - 3D Cake Decorator" in every grocery store and pastry shop.
4	4	"Going the Extra Mile"	September 2, 2015	338,000
David Vidmar works to get his "Glide Cycle" to market, and Jonathan Guy seeks an investor for his robot irrigator, the "Growver."
5	5	"The Sky's the Limit"	September 9, 2015	189,000
Cory Lunn tries to get his "Wake Wing" off the ground, and Dr. Yang Liu and Dr. Frank Papay work to introduce "Smart Goggles" to their peers in the medical profession.
6	6	"Reinventing the Wheel"	September 16, 2015	177,000
Counterterrorism expert Jon Perdue takes aim at the archery market with "The Packbow," and Enayat Motahedy has a new twist on a well-known product with "Twisty Tint."

=== Season 2 (2016) ===
No. overall	No. in season	Title	Original release date	U.S. viewers
7	1	"Life Savers"	October 6, 2016	N/A
8	2	"Barrier to Entry"	October 13, 2016	204,000
9	3	"Toy Tycoons"	October 20, 2016	N/A
10	4	"Millenial Markets"	October 27, 2016	N/A
11	5	"Athletic Ambition"	November 3, 2016	210,000
12	6	"Making Green"	November 10, 2016	241,000
13	7	"Weekend Warriors"	November 17, 2016	N/A
14	8	"Just What the Doctor Ordered"	December 1, 2016	N/A
