= Free Meek =

American docuseries

- Genre: True crime Documentary
- Starring: Meek Mill; Jay-Z; Van Jones; Michael G. Rubin; Tamika Mallory; Paul Solotaroff; Swizz Beatz
- Composers: Roahn Hylton; Jacob Yoffee
- Country of origin: United States
- Original language: English
- No. of seasons: 1
- No. of episodes: 5

Production
- Executive producers: Michael John Warren; Erin Gamble; Eli Holzman; Jay-Z; Meek Mill; Aaron Saidman; Isaac Solotaroff; Paul Solotaroff
- Producer: Patrick Altema
- Production locations: Philadelphia, Pennsylvania; New York City, New York; Los Angeles, California
- Cinematography: Gregg de Domenico
- Running time: 33–48 minutes
- Production companies: Roc Nation; The Intellectual Property Corporation; Amazon Studios

Original release
- Network: Amazon Prime Video
- Release: August 9, 2019

Free Meek is a 2019 true-crime docuseries about American rapper Meek Mill's ongoing battle with the U.S. justice system following a disputed conviction in 2007. The five-part series premiered August 9, 2019, on Amazon Prime Video, and is produced by his record label, Roc Nation and The Intellectual Property Corporation, and executive produced by Mill and Jay-Z. A trailer was released during the 2019 BET Hip Hop Awards ahead of its premiere.

== Background ==
The series examines how Mill has been repeatedly returned to prison based on trivial violations of his parole, and probes the problematic circumstances of the original charges, of which he maintains his innocence. The series includes interviews with Mill and his family, along with Jay-Z, CNN commentator Van Jones, Philadelphia 76ers co-owner Michael G. Rubin, Black Lives Matter activist Tamika Mallory, and Rolling Stone reporter Paul Solotaroff. Quest Research & Investigations (QRI), a firm that collects and examines evidence for litigators, was featured in the docuseries after looking at the facts of Mill's case. The firm had previously worked on the docuseries The Case Against Adnan Syed.

== Episodes ==
| No. | Title | Directed by | Original release date |
|---|---|---|---|
| 1 | "Two Americas" | Isaac Solotaroff | August 9, 2019 |
Meek Mill is a hip-hop superstar but got his start as a battle rapper on the streets of Philly's roughest neighborhoods. At age 19, a violent encounter with law enforcement sends him to jail and ensnares him in the justice system. He will spend the next 11 years trying to break free of its grasp.
| 2 | "The Trap" | Isaac Solotaroff | August 9, 2019 |
Judge Genece Brinkley finds Meek guilty of gun and drug charges and sentences him to 11.5 to 23 months in jail and 10 years of probation. Once released, Meek's music career explodes as he joins forces with Rick Ross and Roc Nation, but a series of probation violations lands him back in Brinkley's courtroom and back in jail. He's now part of a trap that he can't escape.
| 3 | "Under Her Thumb" | Isaac Solotaroff | August 9, 2019 |
Meek struggles with probation as his personal life spirals out of control. After a battle with addiction, a brawl in an airport and an arrest for popping a wheelie, Judge Brinkley sends him to prison for 2-4 years. The case ignites tensions about racial injustice and protesters take to the streets while an investigation into the judge by Meek's defense team produces shocking revelations.
| 4 | "Filthadelphia" | Isaac Solotaroff | August 9, 2019 |
Private investigators take a deep dive into Meek's original arrest and discover new clues. Former cops share explosive allegations about Meek's arresting officer and the investigators learn that the version of events that was presented at Meek's trial may not be the truth. Meek's supporters feel a fresh sense of hope, but will the new revelations be enough to free Meek?
| 5 | "Free, Not Free" | Isaac Solotaroff | August 9, 2019 |
Protesters surround the courthouse as Judge Brinkley decides Meek's fate. Even prosecutors agree that his case should be overturned, but the Judge's decision leaves lawyers scrambling for a new plan. Meek finds himself at the center of a huge national movement as he struggles to overcome the trauma of his prison experience and create a legacy that could change the system forever.
