= The Fairy Jobmother =

British television series

- Genre: Documentary
- Starring: Hayley Taylor
- Countries of origin: United Kingdom; United States
- No. of seasons: 3
- No. of episodes: 15

Production
- Executive producers: Eli Holzman; Shannon Keenan Demers; Stephen Lambert
- Production company: Studio Lambert

Original release
- Network: Channel 4 Lifetime
- Release: October 28 – December 25, 2010

The Fairy Jobmother is a reality documentary television series that follows Hayley Taylor as she assists job-challenged families to motivate them to get back on the payroll.

The programme began with a 3 episode UK series on Channel 4 broadcast starting July 2010. This was followed with an 8 episode US series on Lifetime, premiering on October 28, 2010. A second UK series followed starting June 2011, this time with 4 episodes. The US series was subsequently broadcast in the UK on Channel 4 as "Series 3".

== Episodes ==
Season	Episodes	Originally released	
Season	Episodes	First released	Last released
1	8	October 28, 2010	December 25, 2010

=== US Season (2010) ===
No.	Title	Original release date
1	"It's Now or Never (Aughe Family)"	October 28, 2010
Hayley fixes the habits and financial problems that a young couple on welfare are facing.
2	"Double Whammy (Bethe Family)"	November 4, 2010
Hayley helps a Louisiana family move on from tragic Hurricane Katrina and the Gulf oil spill.
3	"Parent Trap (Senior Family)"	November 11, 2010
Hayley has a family come to terms with their situation and finds out that their support is holding them back.
4	"Confidence Is Everything (Wood Family)"	November 18, 2010
Hayley assists a former construction worker gain back her confidence.
5	"Everything to Lose"	December 2, 2010
Hayley has to help a former news anchor move on with her life before her family files for bankruptcy.
6	"Fear of Failure"	December 11, 2010
Hayley helps a woman who needs to regain her confidence before her family is evicted.
7	"New Mommy Blues"	December 19, 2010
Hayley sits down with a young mother to organize her financial mess then help her divide her time between paying the bills and raising her children.
8	"Not Over the Hill Yet"	December 25, 2010
A graphic designer finds herself in need of Hayley's help after she's unable to figure out what she wants her new career to be after her business closed.
