= Outlaw Empires =

Documentary series about American outlaws

- Genre: Documentary
- Directed by: Marielle Woods
- Composer: John Fee
- Country of origin: United States
- Original language: English
- No. of seasons: 1
- No. of episodes: 6

Production
- Executive producers: Aaron Saidman; Cameo Wallace; Christopher Meindl; Eli Holzman; Kurt Sutter; Philip Lott; Stephen Lambert
- Running time: 43 minutes
- Production companies: Studio Lambert; Sutterink

Original release
- Network: Discovery Channel
- Release: May 14 – June 18, 2012

Outlaw Empires (also known as Kurt Sutter's Outlaw Empires) is a six-part documentary series about American outlaws. It was first aired on May 14, 2012, on Discovery Channel. Each episode focuses on one organization and includes dramatizations of real events and interviews with current and former members. In the biker episode, only former members are interviewed as patched members needed to get the approval of all other members from all other charters to appear on the show.

== Episodes ==
No.	Title	Air date
1	"Crips"	May 14, 2012
2	"American Bikers"	May 21, 2012
3	"South Boston Irish Mob"	May 28, 2012
4	"Italian Mafia"	June 4, 2012
5	"Nuestra Familia"	June 11, 2012
6	"Aryan Brotherhood"	June 18, 2012
