= The Pitch (TV series) =

American television series

- Genre: Unscripted, Reality, Drama
- Directed by: Steven Garcia (4 episodes); Charles Kreisa (1 episode); Philip Lott (unknown episodes) Domini Hofmann (8 episodes)
- Composers: José Cancela, Amy Marie Beauchamp
- Country of origin: United States
- Original language: English
- No. of seasons: 2
- No. of episodes: 16

Production
- Executive producers: Eli Holzman, Stephen Lambert, Phil Lott, Brien Meagher, Aaron Saidman, and Domini Hofmann
- Cinematography: Michael J. Pepin; Alex Van Wagner; Rebecca Roberts
- Running time: 60 minutes (including commercials)
- Production companies: All3Media America; AMC Studios

Original release
- Network: AMC
- Release: April 30, 2012 – October 3, 2013

The Pitch is an unscripted television series from AMC produced by Studio Lambert that goes behind the scenes on the pressure on America's top creative ad agencies competing to pitch a new account. Each week the two agencies go head-to-head in a presentation known as The Pitch, with only seven days to prepare.

The series premiered on Monday, April 30, 2012 and was promoted with an hour-long sneak preview on April 8, 2012 preceded by a Mad Men episode. The show was given a green light in April 2011. In June 2012 the Broadcast Television Journalists' Association nominated The Pitch for a Critics' Choice Television Award in the category of Best Reality Series - Competition.

On August 16, 2012, AMC renewed the series for a second season. The second season premiered on August 15, 2013.

== Episodes ==
=== Season 1 ===
Winner is Bolded

Ep No.	Title	Release date	U.S. viewers (million)
101	Subway: **McKinney** & WDCW	April 8, 2012	0.52
102	Waste Management: **SK+G** & The Ad Store	April 30, 2012	0.17
103	Clockwork: The Hive & **FKM**	May 7, 2012	0.16
104	Popchips: **Conversation** & Boone Oakley	May 13, 2012	0.29
105	Frangelico: The Ad Store & **Kovel/Fuller**	May 20, 2012	0.34
106	JDRF: Muse & **Bozell**	May 27, 2012	
107	C. Wonder: Womenkind & **Digo**	June 3, 2012	0.41
108	Autograph Collection, Marriott International: Jones Advertising & **Bandujo**	June 10, 2012	0.38

- Originally shown on Mondays in the United States, the series switched to Sundays in midseason.

=== Season 2 ===
Ep No.	Title	Release date	U.S. viewers (million)
201	College Hunks Hauling Junk: **Breensmith** & Fletcher Rowley	August 15, 2013	TBA
202	Bliss: **Innerspin** & MC²	August 22, 2013	TBA
203	SquareTrade: Mischievous Studios & **Heavenspot**	August 29, 2013	TBA
204	Tommy Bahama: Pasadena Advertising Marketing Design & **Neuron Syndicate**	September 5, 2013	TBA
205	Little Caesars Pizza: Bee-Line Communications & **Commonground**	September 12, 2013	TBA
206	Gibson Brands: Powell Creative & **DBD**	September 19, 2013	TBA
207	1-800-Flowers.com, Inc.: Cor & **One/X**	September 26, 2013	TBA
208	The Fuller Brush Company: Central Coast & **The Monogram Group**	October 3, 2013	TBA
