= Night Stalker: The Hunt for a Serial Killer =

American true crime documentary miniseries

- Poster
- Genre: True crime Documentary
- Directed by: Tiller Russell and James Carroll
- Country of origin: United States
- Original languages: English; Spanish
- No. of seasons: 1
- No. of episodes: 4

Production
- Executive producers: Eli Holzman; Aaron Saidman; Tiller Russell; Tim Walsh
- Running time: 46–48 minutes
- Production company: The Intellectual Property Corporation

Original release
- Network: Netflix
- Release: January 13, 2021

Night Stalker: The Hunt for a Serial Killer is a 2021 American four-part true crime documentary miniseries about the serial killer Richard Ramirez. The series was executive produced by Tiller Russel, Eli Holzman, Aaron Saidman and Tim Walsh.

== Cast ==
- Richard Ramirez
- Gil Carrillo
- Frank Salerno
- Tony Valdez
- Laurel Erickson
- Paul Skolnick
- Pearl Carrillo
- Linda Arthur
- Zoey Tur
- Frank Falzon
- Anastasia Hronas
- Judith Kneiding Arnold
- Colleen Nelson
- Ester Petschar
- Don Nelson
- Patty Nelson
- Glen Creason

== Episodes ==
| No. | Title | Directed by | Original release date |
|---|---|---|---|
| 1 | "Devil in the City of Angels" | Unknown | January 13, 2021 |
Los Angeles is currently riding a high, having hosted the Olympics while experiencing one of the lowest crime rates in its history. Gil Carrillo and Frank Salerno get started in law enforcement and eventually make it to homicide. Their lives, along with Los Angeles, are changed forever when they are assigned a murder case involving Dayle Yoshie Okazaki. They eventually discover similar murders in the LA area and realize that the murders share the same modus operandi. Victim Anastasia Hronas also details the rape she endured from Ramirez as a child.
| 2 | "Anyone Could Be Next" | Unknown | January 13, 2021 |
The detectives come to the conclusion that there is a serial killer in Los Angeles and paranoia begins to sweep across the LA area. They endure many sleepless nights trying to piece together who is perpetrating the killings. The two detectives also find dental evidence which they believe belongs to the Night Stalker.
| 3 | "Lock. Your. Doors." | Unknown | January 13, 2021 |
LA is going through a heat wave as the detectives are still desperately trying to find the Night Stalker, who has continued killing. They miss a close opportunity to catch him at a dental appointment, which frustrates the detectives. The media is now aware of the story and begins giving regular news briefings on the case, officially calling him "Night Stalker." Frank Salerno interrogates Armando, a man associated with someone who dressed the same as the Night Stalker. This leads to the discovery of the Night Stalker's name, Richard Ramirez.
| 4 | "Manhunt" | Unknown | January 13, 2021 |
The media in conjunction with law enforcement print Ramirez's face in the newspaper, which causes citizens of the LA area to begin a manhunt seeking the man known as "The Night Stalker". Ramirez returns from a trip and discovers that he has been caught when he sees his face on every newspaper. The episode also details Ramirez's courtroom presence, his female fans, and ultimately his death from cancer in 2013 while awaiting execution. The series ends with the detectives detailing how this case has affected their lives.

== Release ==
Night Stalker: The Hunt for a Serial Killer was released on January 13, 2021, on Netflix.

== Reception ==
On the review aggregator website Rotten Tomatoes, the miniseries has a 71% approval rating, based on 34 reviews, with an average rating of 6.7/10. The website's consensus reads, "Though Night Stalker: The Hunt for a Serial Killer succumbs to the sensational side of true crime, it paints a fascinating, chilling portrait of a killer and the city he terrorized."
