= The Million Second Quiz =

2013 American television series

- Genre: Game show
- Created by: Stephen Lambert
- Written by: Lou DiMaggio; Rosemarie DiSalvo; Shelley Herman; Steve Hurley; Joyce Ikemi; Jack Lechner; Adam R. Markowitz; Joseph Neustein; Bobby Patton; Michael J. Prescott; Daniel Schofield; David Levinson Wilk
- Directed by: Glenn Weiss
- Presented by: Ryan Seacrest
- Theme music composer: Joel Beckerman
- Opening theme: "All Night" by Icona Pop
- Country of origin: United States
- Original language: English
- No. of seasons: 1
- No. of episodes: 10

Production
- Executive producers: Stephen Lambert; Eli Holzman; David A. Hurwitz; Ryan Seacrest
- Producers: Guy Carrington; Susan Janis-Mashayekhi; Lauren Meyer; Trevor Rogas; Aaron Saidman
- Production location: New York City
- Editor: William Drucker
- Running time: 44 minutes
- Production companies: All3Media America; Studio Lambert; Ryan Seacrest Productions; Bill's Market & Television Productions; Universal Television

Original release
- Network: NBC (television); NBC.com (Internet)
- Release: September 9 – September 19, 2013

The Million Second Quiz is an American game show that was hosted by Ryan Seacrest and broadcast by NBC. The series aired from September 9 to September 19, 2013. For one million seconds (11 days, 13 hours, 46 minutes, and 40 seconds), contestants attempted to maintain control of a "money chair" by winning trivia matches against other contestants, earning money for every second they occupied the chair. At any given moment, the four highest-scoring contestants other than the one in the chair were sequestered together. When time ran out, the four top scorers received the money they had accumulated and competed in a stepladder playoff for a top prize of $2,000,000.

Executive produced by Stephen Lambert, Eli Holzman, and David Hurwitz, The Million Second Quiz was positioned as a live, multi-platform television event, which Lambert dubbed "the Olympics of quiz", that would help to promote NBC's lineup for the 2013–14 television season. The series was cross-promoted through several NBCUniversal properties, and NBC broadcast a live prime time show for each night of the competition (except for September 15, due to Sunday Night Football) and a two-hour finale. Using a mobile app, viewers could play the game against others and potentially earn a chance to appear as a contestant during the prime time episodes. Outside the prime time episodes, the program was also webcast throughout the competition by means of the Million Second Quiz app and NBC.com.

Critics argued that the confusing format of The Million Second Quiz, along with its lack of drama and technical issues with the show's app during the first days of the series, caused viewers to lose interest in watching it on air. Despite peaking at 6.52 million viewers for its premiere, ratings steadily dropped during the show's run before rising again near the finale.

== Gameplay ==
The quiz was set in an "hourglass-shaped structure" located on a roof in midtown Manhattan, New York City. An indoor set in the same building was also constructed for use during the non-prime time portions of the game and for any inclement weather situations, as occurred on Day 4. Contestants played in a quiz competition that ran 24 hours a day for 1,000,000 seconds, literally 11 days, 13 hours, 46 minutes, and 40 seconds.

At any given time, one contestant sat in the "Money Chair" and accumulated money while defending their position against a series of challengers in head-to-head quiz bouts, which consisted of multiple-choice questions with four answer options. Each bout lasted a set number of seconds; after a question was read, the contestants had five seconds to secretly lock in their answers on separate keypads. They scored points for correct answers, but were not penalized for answering incorrectly or running out of time. The contestant in the chair earned money at a rate of $10 per second, even when bouts were not being played and during the prime time commercial breaks. When this contestant lost a bout, they stopped earning money and the challenger took control of the chair. Only the four contestants with the highest total winnings kept their money once the countdown clock ran out of time.

=== Bouts ===
Each prime time broadcast hour consists of three bouts: the "Challenger" bout, the "Line Jumper" bout, and the "Winner's Defense" bout. Questions start at one point each, with the value increasing by one every 100 seconds. At any time, either contestant may choose to "double" instead of answering; doing so doubles that question's value and forces the opponent to act. A doubled opponent may either answer or "double back", quadrupling the point value and forcing the original contestant to answer. If a doubled or doubled-back contestant answers incorrectly or fails to act within five seconds, the points are awarded to their opponent. Contestants may double as often as they wish during a bout.

At the end of the bout, the contestant with the higher score wins and either retains the Money Chair or replaces its current occupant. If the bout ends in a tie score, a tiebreaker question is asked; the contestant who locks in the correct answer first is the winner. If both of them miss, the contestant who has accumulated more money wins the bout. If a question is in play when the clock runs out, it is completed under the normal rules.

The "Challenger" bout, lasting 300 seconds (five minutes), features a person who has successfully completed an on-site tryout process. The "Line Jumper" bout, lasting 400 seconds (six minutes and 40 seconds), features a contestant who has achieved a sufficiently high score on the official Million Second Quiz app, allowing them to skip the tryouts and advance directly onto the show.

At any given time, the four contestants who have accumulated the most money in their bouts live in "Winners' Row", an area of living quarters set up next to the hourglass. They are at risk of being displaced if someone else outscores them. During a "Winner's Defense" bout, lasting 500 seconds (eight minutes and 20 seconds), the current "Power Player" chooses one of the four Winners' Row occupants (including themself) to face off against the current Money Chair occupant. The winner claims the loser's entire winnings in addition to their own and takes/retains control of the Money Chair, while the loser is eliminated. In episode one, the Power Player was the contestant with the most winnings; starting with episode two, it was the contestant who had the highest number of correct answers from playing along in Winners' Row that day. Contestants who are defeated in the Winner's Defense bouts lose all winnings they have accumulated. All other defeated contestants, including those displaced from Winners' Row by being out-scored, may try out again for a chance to win their way back into the Money Chair.

Outside the one-hour television segments, all bouts last 500 seconds. Each question is worth one point, and no doubling is allowed. Contestants outside of prime time play non-stop save for a ten-minute bathroom break every hour, and their bouts are live-streamed on NBC's website.

=== Finals ===
Once the countdown clock reaches zero, the four contestants with the highest totals throughout the game keep all of their credited winnings and compete in a series of three elimination bouts; the fourth and third-place winners face off in a 400-second bout, the victor of the first bout faces the second-place winner (400 seconds), and the victor of the second bout faces the first-place winner (500 seconds). The victor of the final bout receives a further $2,000,000.

In the season finale, Andrew Kravis defeated Brandon Saunders to win the grand prize, for an overall total of $2,326,346. Seacrest then announced that Kravis's winnings would be increased to $2,600,000 to make him the all-time highest-earning regular-season contestant on a single American game show, surpassing Ken Jennings's $2,522,700 run on Jeopardy! in 2004.

== Production ==
The studio for the series was constructed in the shape of a giant hourglass.

The concept of The Million Second Quiz was intended to make the show a national event; while pitching the format to NBC, creator Stephen Lambert compared the game to a tennis match and called it "the Olympics of quiz." To promote the series, NBC relied on a cross-platform promotional strategy similar to what it had used in the past for The Voice; including appearances by host Ryan Seacrest on other NBC programs, such as the network's NFL pre-game show, Football Night in America. to support the show, and tie-in advertisements for programs airing across other NBCUniversal properties (such as USA Network). The program itself also served as a vehicle for promoting NBC's then-upcoming lineup for the 2013–14 television season.

NBC wanted the game's prime time portions aired live from an outdoor location in Manhattan with the city skyline for background. Production designer Anton Goss, who also designed the set for NBC's The Voice, came up with a three-story bent-steel structure in the shape of a giant hourglass laced with lights and containing the custom-made Money Chair - "...on a rooftop with the city behind us...we have to do something significant...It's like we're building our own little skyscraper." Because of the 18,000 lb weight of the hourglass structure in addition to bleachers full of audience members during show times, the building's rooftop required shoring so that the second floor could help carry the large loads. Geiger Engineers provided the structural engineering for the hourglass and other rooftop structures as well as the required rooftop shoring. Two years after the U.S. version of the show was broadcast, an international version of the show aired on China's Hunan TV in September 2015, entitled 百万秒问答.

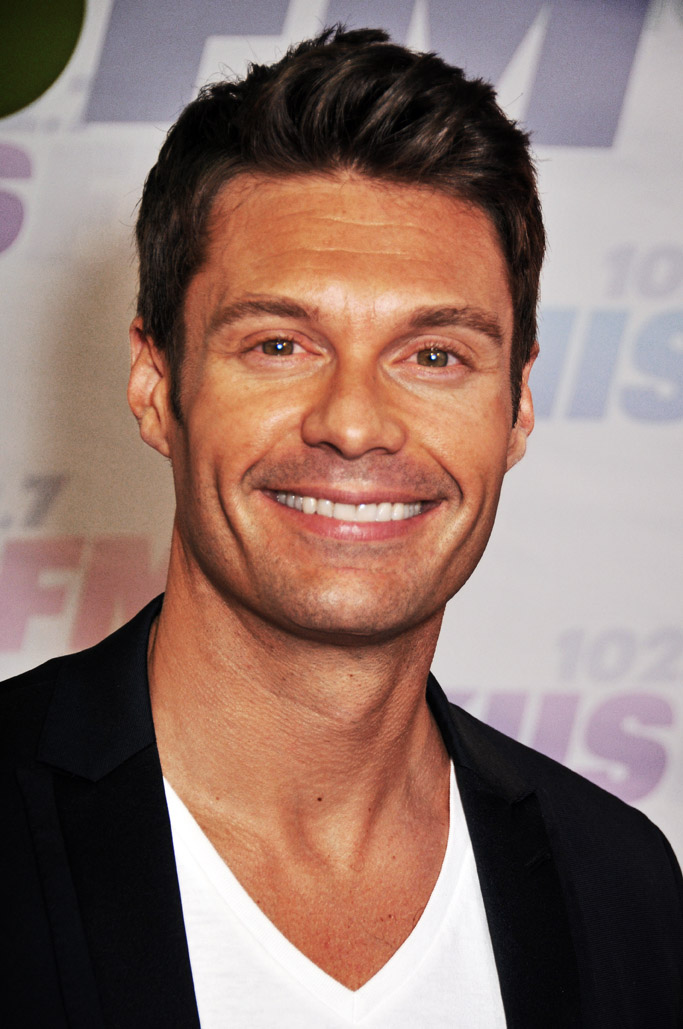
Ryan Seacrest hosted the prime time segments of the event.

The Million Second Quiz premiered on September 9, 2013; the non-prime time quiz began a day earlier at 7:17 AM EDT. The first episode started with 867,826 seconds remaining. The show ran for ten episodes before it concluded on September 19, 2013.

== Reception ==
The Million Second Quiz received negative reviews from television critics, and ratings went down over time: its premiere and finale were seen by 6.52 and 4.95 million viewers respectively, but fell lower in between. The ratings were generally seen as poor; TVWeek described the show as "ratings-challenged," and while NBC president of alternative and late-night programming Paul Telegdy was satisfied with the debut episode's ratings, Michael O'Connor of The Hollywood Reporter described it as a "ratings disaster." O'Connor attributed the poor ratings to the show's confusing format and also quoted a network executive as saying: "I don't know how much worse it can get."

The New York Times' Mike Hale believed that the general failure of the series was a result of its unclear format, the "banal" subject matter of many of its questions (citing examples that ranged from American history to the name of Kim Kardashian's cat), the fact that second screen interactions with game shows were not a new concept, and that the show and its interactive components were not "convergent" enough. Variety's Brian Lowry argued that NBC was "a little too desperate to turn The Million Second Quiz into 'an event,'" and also stated "having watched the opening 2,600 seconds of actual Million Second Quiz content, hey, wake me when it’s almost over."

Writing for The A.V. Club, Sonia Saraiya felt that The Million Second Quiz, in contrast to other major reality shows such as Big Brother, was a "hyped show about hype" that was "so deeply flawed and so universally unpopular that it is not going to remain in anyone's memory for long. ... In this wildly expensive failure, it’s possible to see so many of NBC's flaws, all in the same package." However, she was pleased with the show's production for featuring contestants who were "friendly" and "relatable," rather than "chosen for their reprehensibility." Digital Spy's Catriona Wightman doubted the series would be able to retain viewership: "Even while I sort of enjoyed the first episode despite myself, I can't imagine becoming obsessed with it to that extent - is there really enough there to sustain that kind of interest?"

Writing from a non-prime time contestant's perspective, Seth Stevenson, a journalist for Slate, personally took part in a nighttime slot and was critical of the show's handling of contestants, revealing, "Production assistants whispered that a few contestants who'd pounded 5-Hour Energy shots—in an effort to stay alert—had been registering terrifyingly rapid resting pulse rates." Stevenson also added: "I stumbled out onto 11th Avenue at 2:15 a.m. this morning, two calendar days after my internment began, and...hadn't won any money. I hadn't met Ryan Seacrest. And my unhinged "Story" interview will now live in NBC's video vaults for perpetuity, in any and all media formats now existing or ever to be devised throughout the known and unknown galaxy. At least I'm pretty sure that's what the release said. I'm still too amped up on 5-Hour Energy to be sure."

=== Ratings ===
No.	Title	Original air date	Rating/Share (18–49)	U.S. viewers (millions) (Note: Live + Same Day viewers)	Time slot rank
1	"Day 1"	September 9, 2013	1.7/5	6.52	1
2	"Day 2"	September 10, 2013	1.5/5	5.83	1
3	"Day 3"	September 11, 2013	1.3/4	5.17	3
4	"Day 4"	September 12, 2013	1.1/3	4.16	3
5	"Day 5"	September 13, 2013	0.8/3	3.97	2
6	"Day 6"	September 14, 2013	0.7/3	3.03	4
7	"Day 7"	September 16, 2013	1.0/3	3.59	4
8	"Day 8"	September 17, 2013	1.1/4	5.22	4
9	"Day 9"	September 18, 2013	1.1/4	4.87	3
10	"Finale"	September 19, 2013	1.3/4	4.95	3
