= Benefit Busters =

British television series

- Created by: Studio Lambert
- Country of origin: United Kingdom
- No. of series: 1
- No. of episodes: 3

Production
- Running time: 60 minutes

Original release
- Network: Channel 4
- Release: 20 August – 3 September 2009

Benefit Busters is a British documentary series, broadcast on Channel 4 during August and September 2009. The series has three episodes.

== Reception ==
Gary Day wrote in Times Higher Education, "Billed as a documentary, the programme played as propaganda" and "facts and figures were in short supply." In a positive review, Helen Rumbelow of The Times called the series "powerful, incendiary even, but most of all it was a comic masterpiece, darkly lit". The Guardian television critic Sam Wollaston said that the lead of the first show, Hayley Taylor, is "both wonderful and appalling" in that "she's someone you want on your TV screen, but not in your life".
