= Leah Remini: Scientology and the Aftermath =

American documentary series

- Genre: Documentary series
- Presented by: Leah Remini; Mike Rinder
- Country of origin: United States
- Original language: English
- No. of seasons: 3
- No. of episodes: 37

Production
- Executive producers: Eli Holzman; Leah Remini; Aaron Saidman; Alex Weresow
- Running time: 43 minutes
- Production companies: No Seriously Productions; The Intellectual Property Corporation

Original release
- Network: A&E
- Release: November 29, 2016 – August 26, 2019

Leah Remini: Scientology and the Aftermath is an American documentary series that investigates the Church of Scientology through the experiences of American actress Leah Remini and other former members. She was a follower of Scientology between 1979, when she joined at the age of nine alongside her parents, and 2013. She subsequently became an outspoken critic of Scientology and published a bestselling memoir, Troublemaker: Surviving Hollywood and Scientology, in 2015.

The show's first season was aired by A&E in seven regular and three special episodes commencing November 29, 2016. It received positive reviews from critics, recorded A&E's best premiere ratings since 2014 and maintained a consistently high viewership for subsequent episodes. The first season garnered two Emmy nominations, scoring one win. The series was renewed for a second season of ten regular and four special episodes commencing August 15, 2017. The Church of Scientology was extremely critical of Remini and the show and established several websites attacking the show, its presenters and many of the interviewees. On August 26, 2019, the series ended with a two-hour special.

== Overview ==
In each 43-minute episode, Remini and co-host Mike Rinder investigate what A&E calls "shocking stories of abuse, heartbreak and harassment experienced by those who have left the church and spoken publicly about their experiences". She interviews former members of the Church (Note: Use of "Church" or "the Church" is a common shortened form of "Church of Scientology"; see The Church (Scientology).) who describe their experiences with Scientology and how they have continued to be affected by it even after leaving. She also speaks with a number of former high-ranking church officials who explain the background to the Church's policies and organization, and how this relates to the experiences of ex-members.

In a statement issued by A&E, Remini explained the purpose of her series. She said that she hoped to "shed light on information that makes the world aware of what is really going on and encourages others to speak up so the abuses can be ended forever. I hope that people who have left now feel they have a safe place to go. I hope others who have also experienced abuses will come forward and help us to do something about it."

As part of the pre-broadcast publicity, Remini hosted an "Ask Me Anything" on Reddit in which she explained her views on Scientology and discussed the show. It received nearly 20,000 comments and prompted two similarly themed special episodes to be added to the show's schedule in December 2016 and January 2017.

== Production ==
The series was developed by Remini following the 2015 publication of her memoir Troublemaker: Surviving Hollywood and Scientology. After several former Scientologists contacted her in the wake of the book's release, she decided to shoot a teaser based on the story of one family and approached a number of producers to obtain backing for production. When she spoke with Eli Holzman and Aaron Saidman of The Intellectual Property Corporation, she says that she told them: "Don't be pussies. If you're going to be pussies, you're not the right producers for this." According to Holzman, "Aaron and I huddled and said, 'Are we pussies?'". They decided that they were not, took on the project and facilitated talks with A&E. Explaining why he decided to produce the series, Holzman said: "We're not pro-Scientology or anti-Scientology. We're just documentarians who take the facts as they come to us and investigate every lead as best we can."

Scientology and the Aftermath was mostly filmed over the summer of 2016. Remini served as executive producer for her company, No Seriously Productions, with Holzman and Saidman co-producing. Alex Weresow was the series' showrunner and another executive producer.

An extra episode, titled "Ask Me Anything", was added to the series schedule after its broadcast run started and premiered on December 19. It was filmed over the course of the preceding week in reaction to the ratings success of the opening episode. A second "Ask Me Anything" special was broadcast on January 17, 2017. Another special episode was aired after the end of the first season, titled "Merchants of Fear".

Following the ratings success of the first season, a second, ten-episode season was announced by A&E in March 2017, which premiered August 15, 2017. Executive production was again handled by Remini and her company No Seriously Productions, with Eli Holzman and Aaron Saidman of The Intellectual Property Corp also executive producing. Remini said in a statement: "The show is really about standing up for what is right and not letting bullies have their way. I feel it is important for people to know that you can take action to bring about change, both for yourself and for others."

Remini said that after the first season aired, many people contacted her and Mike Rinder to tell their own stories of abuse in Scientology. She had not originally intended to make a second season, but went ahead following what Holzman called a "deluge of people emboldened to come forward". He said that the team was "sitting on some really damning and actionable material and can't wait to premiere."

== Episodes and broadcast history ==
=== Series overview ===
Season	Episodes	Originally released	
Season	Episodes	First released	Last released
1	7 (+3)	November 29, 2016	May 29, 2017
2	10 (+4)	August 15, 2017	November 21, 2017
3	10 (+2)	November 13, 2018	February 5, 2019
Series Finale		August 26, 2019	

=== Season 1 (2016–17) ===
The first season comprises seven episodes broadcast on Tuesday nights, plus two episodes added to the schedules for the night of Monday, December 19, 2016 and Tuesday, January 17, 2017, as well as a two-hour special aired on May 29, 2017.

The show's seven original episodes (minus the three specials) have also been broadcast in Europe on the satellite TV Crime & Investigation Network (Europe), commencing March 11, 2017, and in South East Asia on the Crime & Investigation Network (South East Asia) commencing April 2017.

No. overall	No. in season	Title	Original release date	U.S. viewers (millions)
1	1	"Disconnection"	November 29, 2016	2.11
Remini visits former Scientology executive Amy Scobee in Seattle and hears about how she was "disconnected" from her mother.
2	2	"Fair Game"	December 6, 2016	1.57
Remini visits the spiritual headquarters of Scientology – Clearwater, Florida – to hear Mike Rinder's personal story.
3	3	"The Bridge"	December 13, 2016	1.46
Remini describes the heavy financial and emotional price she and other current/former Scientologists have paid to move along "The Bridge to Total Freedom."
4	S	"Ask Me Anything"	December 19, 2016	1.37
Remini interviews guests including Paulette Cooper, the target of Operation Freakout, while answering viewers' questions.
5	4	"A Leader Emerges"	December 20, 2016	1.49
Remini tells the story of how David Miscavige took over the Church of Scientology following the death of its founder, L. Ron Hubbard, and interviews his father Ron.
6	5	"Golden Era"	December 27, 2016	1.65
Remini interviews Marc Headley about his time at Golden Era Productions, the Church's promotional organization, and his escape from its Gold Base compound.
7	6	"Auditing"	January 3, 2017	1.51
Remini interviews Aaron Smith-Levin, who was a prodigy at the Church's practice of auditing along with his twin brother Collin, who died in an automobile accident after he was dismissed from the program.
8	7	"Enemies of the Church"	January 10, 2017	1.75
Remini meets with a young man whom the Church claims she provoked into committing a hate crime, interviews journalists who have been relentlessly hounded by the Church for reporting on it, and considers the possibility of legal action.
9	S	"Ask Me Anything, Part 2"	January 17, 2017	1.41
Remini answers more questions from viewers and interviews cult expert Steven Hassan; Lawrence Wright, the author of Going Clear: Scientology, Hollywood, and the Prison of Belief; and attorney Ray Jeffrey.
10	S	"Merchants of Fear"	May 29, 2017	N/A
In this double episode Remini and Rinder explore the conflict between the Church of Scientology and its critics with guests Mark Ebner, Ford Greene, Stephen A. Kent, Janet Reitman, Bryan Seymour and Len Zinberg, who describe their own experiences of being targeted by the Church or working for it to target others.

=== Season 2 (2017) ===
The second season contained ten regular and four special episodes, broadcasting on Tuesday nights commencing August 15, 2017.

No. overall	No. in season	Title	Original release date	U.S. viewers (millions)
11	1	"Thetans in Young Bodies"	August 15, 2017	1.40
Remini and Rinder meet two women who, as children, were raised in Scientology's Cadet Org and suffered abandonment and sexual abuse.
12	2	"The Ultimate Failure of Scientology"	August 22, 2017	1.40
The show tells the stories of two Scientologists who suffered from depression and suicidal ideation before they killed themselves, having gone untreated because Scientology does not believe in mental illness.
13	3	"The 'Perfect' Scientology Family"	August 29, 2017	1.30
After being raised as a third-generation Scientologist, Philip Gale, a brilliant computer science student, jumped to his death at the age of 19. Remini and Rinder meet his sister Liz, who relates his experiences with the Church.
14	S	"The Bridge to Total Freedom"	September 5, 2017	1.27
In the first of four special episodes, Remini, Rinder and guests discuss Scientology's 'Bridge to Total Freedom' and Scientology doctrine, including the Operating Thetan (OT) levels.
15	4	"The Rise of David Miscavige"	September 12, 2017	1.38
Remini and Rinder discuss the rise and power of the Church leader David Miscavige.
16	5	"Scientology and Celebrity: The Betrayal of Paul Haggis"	September 19, 2017	1.42
Remini and Rinder interview Academy Award-winning filmmaker and former Scientologist Paul Haggis and a former Scientology recruiter about the Church's strategy of recruiting celebrities.
17	6	"The Ranches"	October 10, 2017	1.22
Remini and Rinder meet Tara Reile and Nathan Rich, who attended Scientology's Mace-Kingsley Ranch School and discuss the abuses they experienced.
18	7	"The Greatest Good"	October 17, 2017	1.04
Exploring the theme of parental abandonment, Remini and Rinder speak to two former Church members: Mimi Faust, whose Scientologist mother abandoned her at age 13 when Faust refused to sign a contract with organization, and Christi Gordon, was sent to with her sister when they were 10 and 11 to live with the Cadet Org, where they suffered sexual molestation.
19	S	"The Business of Religion"	October 24, 2017	1.04
In the second of four special episodes, Leah and Mike lead a roundtable discussion with former Sea Org Member Matt Pesch, blogger Jeffrey Augustine, and ex-Scientologist Luis Garcia and his attorney Ted Babbitt to examine the contracts that all Scientologists must follow and the financial requests they're required to fulfill.
20	8	"Lifetime of Healing"	October 31, 2017	0.93
Leah sits down with two of her childhood friends, Chantal Dodson and Sherry Ollins, for an emotional conversation about their shared experiences growing up in Scientology. They look back on how their friendship helped them to survive during their most difficult times and how they're now trying to heal with each other's support.
21	9	"Aftermath of the Aftermath"	November 7, 2017	0.87
Leah and Mike reunite with participants from the first season and discuss their lives following their respective broadcasts; they later interviewed Chantal Dodson and her mother, who, as hinted at by a postscript in the previous episode, had left the Church due in part to what she had learned from the show.
22	S	"Propaganda Arms"	November 12, 2017	1.02
A roundtable discussion about the Church's propaganda arms, analyzing the tactics the groups employ to forward a Scientology agenda.
23	S	"The Life & Lies of L. Ron Hubbard"	November 14, 2017	0.97
A roundtable discussion, examining the life and lies of L. Ron Hubbard.
24	10	"Ask Me Anything Season 2"	November 21, 2017	0.81
Leah answers viewer questions about Season 2 of Leah Remini: Scientology and the Aftermath.

=== Season 3 (2018–19) ===
On March 14, 2018, A&E announced that the series would return for a third season. On November 13, 2018, A&E aired a special two-hour episode titled Scientology and the Aftermath: The Jehovah's Witnesses in which Remini and Rinder investigate the similarities between Jehovah's Witnesses and Scientology, followed by a second special episode about the "Emotional Aftermath" of Scientology on Leah and Mike's families, broadcast November 18, 2018. The first regular episode of the third season premiered on November 27, 2018.

No. overall	No. in season	Title	Original release date	U.S. viewers (millions)
25	S	"The Jehovah's Witnesses"	November 13, 2018	0.97
In this special episode, Leah and Mike discuss the beliefs and experiences of Jehovah's Witnesses with nine former church members including actor Jerry Minor, activist Lloyd Evans, and MMA fighter Nate Quarry.
26	S	"The Emotional Aftermath"	November 18, 2018	0.86
Two of Leah's producers discuss the emotional consequences of leaving Scientology with Leah, Mike and their families. Guests include Leah's mother and two sisters, along with Mike's wife.
27	1	"Star Witness"	November 27, 2018	0.96
Leah Remini and Mike Rinder interview former Sea Org member Valerie Haney, one of the last people to see David Miscavige's wife Shelly Miscavige before she went missing in 2006. She tells her story about her life and escape from the Church.
28	2	"Spies Like Us"	December 4, 2018	0.92
Remini and Rinder interview a former Scientology Private Investigator who explains her job within Scientology. Also, Leah and Mike interview one of Mike's closest friends who lost his business because of Scientology.
29	3	"Unlikely Pairing"	December 11, 2018	0.88
In recent years the head of the Nation of Islam, Minister Louis Farrakhan, publicly embraced Dianetics and the teachings of L. Ron Hubbard and supported their use in NOI Mosques. This formed what many are describing as an unusual bond between The Nation of Islam and The Church of Scientology. Leah and Mike discuss this alliance and interview two special guests–a former and current member of the Nation of Islam–who share their personal feelings about this collaboration. They reveal what they witnessed first-hand since the two controversial organizations came together and Leah reveals the part she played in introducing the Nation of Islam to the Church of Scientology.
30	4	"Where is Shelly?"	December 18, 2018	0.95
In 2006, Leah Remini attended the wedding of Tom Cruise and Katie Holmes. Leah remarked on the absence of church leader David Miscavige's wife, Shelly Miscavige, which set off a chain of events that ultimately led to her leaving Scientology. More than a decade later, Shelly still has not been seen in public. In this episode, Leah and Mike interview Shelly's childhood friend Janis Gillham-Grady, a fellow Commodore's Messenger serving L. Ron Hubbard, and Tom DeVocht, who worked closely with both David and Shelly Miscavige.
31	5	"Ideal Orgs"	January 1, 2019	1.10
Under the leadership of David Miscavige, Scientology has been purchasing large buildings to use as upgraded church locations, celebrated as "Ideal Orgs". The Church claims that the new buildings signal the rapid expansion of Scientology, but former members and critics say otherwise. In this episode, Leah and Mike interview Paul Burkhart, a former Ideal Org architect, and Bert Schippers, a former Scientologist who was a major Ideal Org donor.
32	6	"The Collection Agency"	January 8, 2019	0.79
Leah and Mike interview former Scientologists who share the different ways they claim they were made to give the Church money they couldn't afford. Their stories range from those who are thousands of dollars in debt, to those who were left financially and emotionally bankrupt. They also interview a former member of the Church whose job it was to solicit money from parishioners by what she describes as “any means necessary”.
33	7	"Gilman Springs Road"	January 15, 2019	0.92
Leah and Mike interview four former Scientologists Sea Org members and discuss their personal effects about being at Gold Base and the abuse from Church leader David Miscavige.
34	8	"Buying a Town (Part 1)"	January 22, 2019	0.87
In 1974, operating under an alias, the Church of Scientology moved into Clearwater, Florida, and proceeded to make the city its spiritual headquarters. In 1977, an FBI raid uncovered the Church's secret plans to take over the city. In this episode, Leah and Mike visit Clearwater and speak to some of the city's most prominent Scientology critics.
35	9	"Buying a Town (Part 2)"	January 29, 2019	1.04
Leah and Mike travel to Clearwater, Florida, spiritual headquarters for the Church of Scientology. Speaking with some of the city's most prominent Scientology critics, they explore how the controversial 1995 death of Scientologist Lisa McPherson marked a turning point in the Church's history.
36	10	"Church and State"	February 5, 2019	0.81
Leah and Mike speak with Jay Wexler, an expert in constitutional law, to discuss the remarkable story of Scientology's journey to tax-exempt status. Mike and Leah also talk with Lt. Yulanda Williams, a police officer, about law enforcement's community engagement strategies.

=== Series Finale (2019) ===
No. overall	Title	Original release date	U.S. viewers (millions)
37	"Waiting for Justice"	August 26, 2019	0.71
Leah Remini: Scientology and the Aftermath concluded with a two-hour series finale special on August 26, 2019. In the finale, which was filmed for the first time in front of a live studio audience, Remini and Mike Rinder explored stories of how Church of Scientology policies have hindered members from reporting instances of abuse and sexual assault to the authorities. They spoke to ex-Scientologists who shared their stories of abuse at the hands of other Scientologists, and described how the policies are aimed at preventing the alleged crimes from becoming public. A panel of legal, psychological and law-enforcement experts also provided insight into the impact Scientology’s practices have had on its former parishioners and advised how they can seek justice and effect change in the future.

== Reception ==
=== Reviews ===
The show attracted moderately positive reviews for its first episode, though some reviewers questioned its likely impact. The Hollywood Reporter described it as "interesting, but unlikely to generate a following", commenting that while it would "stir up some viewer emotions" its format was not very dynamic, with "a lot of sitting around talking, interspersed with footage from fairly innocuous Scientology promotional videos and event interviews." Newsday felt that in the light of previous Scientology exposés such as the book and film Going Clear and Remini's own earlier book, "almost nothing here feels fresh or unexpected." The Los Angeles Times called it "a compelling, if unsophisticated, investigation" of Scientology and described its focus on harmed families "an effective strategy that will likely resonate with many viewers." Writing in The Atlantic, Sophie Gilbert highlighted Remini's ability to reach broader audiences and called the show "a valuable continuation of efforts to shed light on some of [Scientology's] most egregious practices".

CNN saw the show as "a step up in class for A&E" that delivers "a sobering warning to those who might be susceptible to the [Scientology] sales pitch". While acknowledging the repetitive nature of Remini "hearing the same story over and over again", The Huffington Post commented that "under normal circumstances, the same story over eight episodes would make for a tedious and boring show, but "Aftermath" is telling a horror story, and the repetition is powerful." Salon suggested that the show's best asset was "Remini's honest anger and frustration, both of which blaze across the screen in reaction to particularly damning revelations", but wondered who the show's audience was meant to be and questioned the extent of its appeal: "It is hard to fathom anyone other than the most hard-core obsessives sticking around to watch all eight installments of this limited series."

By the end of the first season's run, it had attracted critical praise as well as strong viewer numbers. Describing it as a "Peak TV Treasure", Kimberly Roots of TVLine commented that "If you heard about the docu-series and quickly dismissed it as a pathetic cash-grab on Remini's part (like I did at first), it's worth a second look." The Straits Times called it "riveting television" for telling the "remarkable" stories of its interviewees. The first season received a 78% rating on Rotten Tomatoes.

=== Awards and nominations ===
Year	Award	Category	Nominee(s)	Result	Ref.
2017	Primetime Emmy Awards	Outstanding Informational Series or Special	Eli Holzman, Aaron Saidman, Leah Remini, Alex Weresow, Devon Graham Hammonds, Erin Gamble, Rachelle Mendez and Jeana Dill	Won	
2017	Primetime Emmy Awards	Outstanding Sound Editing for a Nonfiction Program (Single or Multi-Camera)	David Crocco and Rolando Nadal (for "Golden Era")	Nominated	
2017	TCA Awards	Outstanding Achievement in Reality Programming	Leah Remini: Scientology and the Aftermath	Won	
2017	OFTA Television Awards	Best Reality or Nonfiction Program	Leah Remini: Scientology and the Aftermath	Won	
2017	OFTA Television Awards	Best Individual Host or Panelist in a Reality or Nonfiction Program	Leah Remini	Nominated	
2017	IDA Documentary Awards	Best Episodic Series	Leah Remini, Aaron Saidman, Alex Weresow, Devon Graham Hammonds, Elaine Frontain Bryant and Amy Savitsky	Nominated	
2018	Primetime Emmy Awards	Outstanding Informational Series or Special	Eli Holzman, Aaron Saidman, Leah Remini, Devon Graham Hammonds, Myles Reiff, Elaine Frontain Bryant and Amy Savitsky	Nominated	
2018	OFTA Television Awards	Best Writing of a Reality or Nonfiction Program	Leah Remini: Scientology and the Aftermath	Nominated	
2018	American Cinema Editors Awards	Best Edited Non-Scripted Series	Reggie Spangler, Ben Simoff, Kevin Hibbard and Vince Oresman (for "The Perfect Scientology Family")	Nominated	
2018	Producers Guild of America Awards	Outstanding Producer of Non-Fiction Television	Leah Remini, Eli Holzman, Aaron Saidman, Myles Reiff, Adam Saltzberg, Erin Gamble, Lisa Rosen, Grainne Byrne, Taylor Levin, Alex Weresow and Rachelle Mendez	Won	
2019	Primetime Emmy Awards	Outstanding Informational Series or Special	Leah Remini, Eli Holzman, Aaron Saidman, Myles Reiff, Mike Rinder, Meaghan Rady and Kai Bowe	Nominated	
2019	Producers Guild of America Awards	Outstanding Producer of Non-Fiction Television	Leah Remini, Eli Holzman, Aaron Saidman, Myles Reiff, Mike Rinder, Meaghan Rady, Kai Bowe, Hoo In Kim, Nora Donaghy, Raisa Zaidi and Dina Demetrius	Nominated	
2019	OFTA Television Awards	Best Reality or Nonfiction Program	Leah Remini: Scientology and the Aftermath	Won	
2020	Primetime Emmy Awards	Outstanding Hosted Nonfiction Series or Special	Leah Remini, Eli Holzman, Aaron Saidman, Ray Dotch, Devon Graham Hammonds, Chris Rowe and Mike Rinder (for "Waiting for Justice")	Won	

=== Scientology reaction ===
The Church of Scientology was critical of the series. Prior to broadcast, it issued a 530-word statement attacking Remini. The Church's statement alleged that she was spreading lies about the Church of Scientology along with claims that former Scientologists who participate in the show were kicked out. It established a website dedicated to attempting to discredit the series, and its lawyers also sought to force A&E to abandon the planned broadcast of the show. In response, Remini demanded that the Church pay her $1.5 million in damages for past and present reputational, emotional, and economic injuries. When Remini appeared on Conan on January 25, 2017, to promote Scientology and the Aftermath, the Church sent the show's host Conan O'Brien a personal letter seeking to discredit her – something that O'Brien says had never before happened in his 24 years of hosting late-night talk shows.

At the start of each segment, statements appear on-screen describing the Church's dispute of the material presented and its refusal to participate in the series. Excerpts from letters written by the Church, attacking the credibility of Remini and her interview subjects, are also displayed and read in a move that Salon described as an attempt to "appease the notoriously litigious church".

The premiere of the second season prompted an Indian Scientologist to start a petition on Change.org calling on A&E to cancel the show, claiming that it was "a type of hate-show made to create violence, with false claims, showing a totally negative side of Scientology. This is total criminal! Ban it!". Scientologists Taking Action Against Discrimination (STAND), a front group for the Church, circulated form letters to its parishioners for them to send to A&E's advertisers asking them to disown the show for its "religious hate and bigotry which leads to violence". A Scientology spokesperson claimed that the show had led to "violent acts and death threats against the church." An ex-Scientologist also circulated a petition calling on the U.S. government to review the tax status of Scientology in the United States and revoke its tax exemption.

=== Ratings ===
The first episode of the show was a major ratings success for A&E, attracting 2.1 million viewers. This represented the network's most successful premiere since Big Smo in 2014, and substantially exceeded the 1.65 million who watched the premiere of HBO's Scientology documentary film Going Clear in March 2015. The ratings for the subsequent episodes were lower but held steady at between 1.4 and 0.9 million viewers. The second season's first two episodes produced ratings of 1.4 million viewers, down from the first season, but reflecting August's typically lower number of viewers.
