= This Is Paris =

2020 documentary film

- Official release poster
- Directed by: Alexandra Dean
- Written by: Alexander Dean
- Produced by: Paris Hilton; Aaron Saidman
- Starring: Paris Hilton
- Cinematography: Arlene Nelson
- Edited by: Aaron McAdams; Jill Woodward
- Music by: Lara Meyerratken
- Production company: The Intellectual Property Corporation
- Distributed by: YouTube Originals
- Release date: September 14, 2020
- Running time: 110 minutes
- Country: United States
- Language: English

This Is Paris is a 2020 documentary film produced by YouTube Originals about media personality Paris Hilton, including her experiences as a former victim of the troubled teen industry.

== Plot ==
This is Paris is about Hilton's day-to-day experiences and shows previously unknown stories regarding her personal life. In the film, she reveals her experiences with being gooned, and the emotional, verbal and physical abuse she experienced while attending a series of boarding schools as a teenager. It also chronicles Hilton's professional trajectory, from the beginning to the present day, supported by interviews with family members and friends.

== Production ==
The film was directed by Alexandra Dean, financed by The Intellectual Property Corporation and released by YouTube Originals. Dean was first contacted by IPC following the release of her previous documentary, Bombshell: The Hedy Lamarr Story (2017). "They saw all these parallels between Bombshell and Paris", Dean stated in an interview with CNN, adding: "I thought Paris is definitely unseen and misunderstood. I mean, I didn't see her or understand her for decades. I definitely wrote her off. [...] She has a billion dollar empire. She runs it and whether you like it or not, whether you like her or not, you have to respect that. It's not an easy thing to do. She does it almost solo. I saw that up close".

Despite not being prepared to disclose certain information, Hilton trusted Dean's approach and found the process of filming to be a healing space for her. She served as a producer but did not have artistic authority over the production, which she admitted was a big risk, since she always had "complete creative control" of her business ventures.

Filming took place between 2019 and 2020, in the United States, South Korea and Belgium, among other locations.

== Reception ==
=== Viewership ===
This is Paris, released on YouTube on September 14, 2020, garnered over 16 million views in its first month of release. As of June 2023, the documentary has amassed over 76 million views on the platform.

=== Critical response ===
On the review aggregation website Rotten Tomatoes, the documentary has an approval rating of 63% based on 8 reviews. Two reviewers deemed it a successful "rebranding" of its subject's image.

In her review for The Guardian, Michelle Kambasha praised This Is Paris for its honest and unfiltered portrayal of Paris Hilton, calling it a documentary that truly "puts the reality in reality TV." She appreciated how it goes beyond Hilton's well-known image as a glamorous socialite, instead revealing her as a survivor of institutional abuse. Kambasha highlighted the emotional depth of the film, which delves into the lasting impact of her past experiences and shows a more vulnerable, human side of Hilton.

== See also ==
- List of documentary films
