= Sheldon Yellen =

American businessman and author

- Born: Sheldon David Yellen; January 16, 1958 (age 68)
- Known for: CEO of BELFOR Property Restoration
- Children: 2

Sheldon David Yellen (born January 16, 1958) is an American businessman, author and the CEO of BELFOR Property Restoration.

== Biography ==
Yellen was born to a Jewish family, the oldest of four boys. He was raised alone by his mother. He attended Southfield-Lathrup High School but dropped out to support his family (he later received his diploma at the age of 53). In 1985, he went to work as a salesman for his brothers-in-law's company then known as Quality Awning & Construction which also did restoration work. In 1989, Yellen booked $17 million in sales in South Carolina which was devastated by Hurricane Hugo, effectively doubling the company's sales. He became CEO in 2001.

In 2011, Yellen appeared on an Emmy-nominated episode of Undercover Boss on CBS.

Per Yellen, in 2016 BELFOR is the world's largest disaster restoration company operating in 29 countries with more than 350 offices and employing more than 7,700 full-time employees.

He is a guest writer for Entrepreneur - US edition: 4 Ways to Ensure Your Startup Will Survive Disaster, How to Make People, Not Résumés, Your Hiring Priority, How Growing Up With Nothing Equipped Me to Run a Billion-Dollar Company.

In 2019, Yellen was awarded an honorary doctorate from Oakland University.

Yellen hand-writes over 12,000 cards each year for employees' birthdays and other thanks and congratulations.

== Personal life ==
At the age of 26, he married at Temple Israel in West Bloomfield Township, Michigan; he has two sons. Although he had a bar mitzvah, he did not begin to practice Judaism until he was in his mid-40s.
