= Aaron Saidman =

American executive producer (born 1974)

- Born: December 11, 1974 (age 51)
- Occupations: Television producer, documentary filmmaker
- Years active: 2012–present
- Notable work: Leah Remini: Scientology and the Aftermath; Declassified; The Seven Five; Undercover Boss; The Pitch; The People's Couch; True Life; Mind Field; Free Meek; Indian Matchmaking; Living Undocumented; This Is Paris; Night Stalker: The Hunt for a Serial Killer
- Website: www.theipcorp.com

Aaron Saidman (born December 11, 1974) is an American creator-developer, documentary filmmaker and television producer known for creating or serving as an executive producer on a number of non-fiction television series and documentary feature films, including Leah Remini: Scientology and the Aftermath, Curse of Von Dutch, Mind Field, Declassified: Untold Stories of American Spies, The Pitch, The Seven Five, Free Meek and Night Stalker: The Hunt for a Serial Killer. Saidman is the President and co-founder of The Intellectual Property Corporation, which he created in 2016 with longtime producing partner Eli Holzman.

== Career ==
In 2017, The Hollywood Reporter named Saidman one of the "Top 10 Power Players" in reality television. Later that year, Saidman won a Primetime Emmy Award for Leah Remini: Scientology and the Aftermath, in the category of Outstanding Informational Series or Special, as well as a TCA Award for Outstanding Achievement in Reality Programming, and a Producers Guild of America Award for Best Non-Fiction Television for the first and second seasons of the series. Saidman and Holzman developed the high-profile Scientology series with actress Leah Remini after Saidman heard that Remini and her agents were interested in producing a documentary about her experience in the Church of Scientology. Saidman also executive produced the documentary series Active Shooter: America Under Fire, which premiered on Showtime in 2017.

In 2018, Saidman was named President of Industrial Media, following CORE Media Group's acquisition of The Intellectual Property Corporation. Saidman is a member of the board of directors of the International Documentary Association (IDA) from 2018 to 2022

In 2019, Saidman and Anna Chai co-directed the Netflix documentary series Living Undocumented, which Saidman executive produced with Eli Holzman, Selena Gomez, and her mother Mandy Teefey, Sean O'Grady and Anna Chai. The series follows eight undocumented immigrants living in the United States, and was nominated for a News and Documentary Emmy Award in the category of "Outstanding Editing: Documentary" in 2020. In 2019, Living Undocumented was nominated for an IDA Award for "Best Episodic Series."

In 2020, Saidman was one of the executive producers for the Netflix unscripted television series Indian Matchmaking. That same year, he produced the critically acclaimed documentary This Is Paris, about socialite Paris Hilton and directed by Alexandra Dean. Saidman approached Hilton in 2018 after reading an article about her and the cultural trends she had started, wittingly and unwittingly, and grew curious about who she was as a person. After meeting, Saidman and Hilton decided to make a documentary that was "truly authentic" and could "reveal the deeper essence of who Paris really is—in a way that the public hadn't really seen before, but also in a way that Paris herself hadn't really come to terms with and hadn't explored herself."This Is Paris was chosen as an official selection at the 2020 Tribeca Film Festival. Saidman also served as an executive producer for the HBO documentary series We're Here, which was released in 2020 and he eventually won a Peabody Award for the show in 2023. Saidman also created and produced the cooking series Selena + Chef, his second collaboration with Selena Gomez, which was released on August 13, 2020.

In 2021, it was announced that Saidman would produce a documentary series about the fashion brand Von Dutch for Hulu. Saidman also served as an executive producer for the true crime docuseries Night Stalker: The Hunt for a Serial Killer, which was released in 2021.

After Sony Pictures Television acquired Industrial Media in 2022, the company named Saidman Co-President of Nonfiction Entertainment, a new division focused on nonfiction content. Saidman served as executive producer for the A&E documentary series Secrets of Playboy, which was released in 2022.

Saidman executive produced the film The Disappearance of Shere Hite, a documentary about the life of sex researcher Shere Hite, which premiered at the Sundance Film Festival in January 2023. In March 2023, Saidman was a guest on Emmy-winning producer Jimmy Fox's podcast titled Unscripted and Unprepared.

Saidman executive produced the documentary series Deadlocked: How America Shaped the Supreme Court, for which he was nominated for a Film Independent Spirit Award for Best New Non-Scripted or Documentary Series.
