= List of Bellarmine College Preparatory alumni =

This list includes notable graduates of Bellarmine College Preparatory in San Jose, California.

== Arts and literature ==
Name	Class year	Notability	Reference(s)
Dennis Crosby	1952	Singer and actor	
Phillip Crosby	1952	Singer and actor	
Frank Bergon	1961	Writer	
Michael Zagaris	1963	Sports photographer	
Eugene Jarvis	1972	Video game and pinball programmer	
Frank C. Girardot	1973	Author, Name Dropper: Investigating the Clark Rockefeller Mystery	
Carmine Gallo	1983	Author and speaker	
Kelly Grovier	1987	Poet and literary critic	
Stephen Mirrione	1987	Film editor, Traffic	
Viet Thanh Nguyen	1988	2016 Pulitzer Prize winner in fiction for his novel The Sympathizer	
Gregg Hurwitz	1991	Author	
Bassnectar (Lorin Ashton)	1986	Musician	
Darren Korb	2000	Composer and songwriter	
Sunkrish Bala	2002	Actor	
Jose Moreno Brooks	2003	Actor	
Alex Brightman	2005	Actor	

== Athletes ==
Name	Class year	Notability	Reference(s)
Marv Owen	1924	Major League Baseball (MLB) (1931–1940)	
Nello Falaschi	1931	Played for NFL's New York Giants	
John W. Gallivan	1933	Publisher of The Salt Lake Tribune, 1960–1984	
Leo Righetti	1944	Baseball player	
Conn Findlay	1944	Holds four Olympic medals, three in rowing (1956 gold, 1960 bronze, 1964 gold) and one in sailing (1976 bronze)	
Wayne Belardi	1948	MLB first baseman	
Joe Albanese	1951	MLB pitcher	
Jim Small	1955	MLB (1955–1958)	
Stephen Schott	1957	Former owner of Oakland Athletics	
Billy Connors	1959	MLB pitcher and coach	
Bob Gallagher	1962	MLB (1972–1975)	
Terry Shea	1964	Head coach, Virginia Armada	
Dan Pastorini	1967	NFL quarterback (1971–1981, 1983), Super Bowl XV champion; played in 1975 Pro Bowl	
Jim Wilhelm	1970	MLB (1978–1979)	
Nick Holt	1981	Defensive coordinator of Purdue Boilermakers, former head coach of Idaho Vandals	
Sal Cesario	1981	NFL offensive guard	
Erik Howard	1982	Played for NFL's New York Giants, New York Jets	
David Diaz-Infante	1982	Played for NFL's San Diego Chargers, Denver Broncos, Philadelphia Eagles	
Randy Kirk	1983	NFL (1987–1999)	
Pablo Morales	1983	Olympic gold and silver medalist (1979–1983)	
Jim Wahler	1984	Played for NFL's Phoenix Cardinals, Washington Redskins	
Greg Gohr	1985	MLB (1993–1996)	
Troy Buckley	1986	Associate head coach, Nevada Mountain West Conference	
Ron Caragher	1985	NCAA football head coach	
Ed Giovanola	1987	MLB (1995–1999)	
Kyle Krpata	1988	Goalkeeper, Continental Indoor Soccer League	
Kevin McMahon	1990	Track & field athlete at 1996 and 2000 Olympics	
Justin Baughman	1992	MLB second baseman	
Pat Burrell	1994	MLB outfielder	
Kevin Frandsen	2000	MLB player, San Francisco Giants (2006–2015)	
Craig Bragg	2000	National Football League (NFL) wide receiver	
Copeland Bryan	2001	NFL defensive end	
Francis Maka	2003	Linebacker, San Jose SaberCats of Arena Football League	
Eric Thames	2004	MLB player (2011–2012, 2017–2020)	
Scott Weltz	2005	U.S. Olympic swimmer in 2012 Olympics (200 m breaststroke)	
Tommy Medica	2006	MLB (2013–14)	
Mark Canha	2007	MLB first baseman	
Erik Goeddel	2007	MLB pitcher, New York Mets (2014–2018)	
Michael Clay	2009	Special teams coordinator for the Philadelphia Eagles	
Marc Pelosi	2012	MLS soccer player, San Jose Earthquakes (2015–2017)	
Mitchell Harrison White	2013	MLB pitcher	
Austin Ajiake	2018	Linebacker, Indianapolis Colts	

== Business ==
Name	Class year	Notability	Reference(s)
John A. Sobrato	1957	Real estate developer	
Helmy Eltoukhy	1997	Co-founder & CEO of biotech startup companies Avantome and Guardant Health	
Brian Armstrong	2001	Founder and CEO of Coinbase	
Brendon Foody	2021	Co-founder and CEO of Mercor, youngest self-made billionaire (tied with Adarsh Hiremath and Surya Midha)	
Adarsh Hiremath	2021	Co-founder and CTO of Mercor, youngest self-made billionaire (tied with Brendon Foody and Surya Midha)	
Surya Midha	2021	Co-founder and board member of Mercor, youngest self-made billionaire (tied with Adarsh Hiremath and Brendon Foody)	

== Jesuit priests ==
Name	Class year	Notability	Reference(s)
Joseph Fessio	1958	Jesuit priest and founder of Ignatius Press	
Robert Ballecer	1992	Jesuit priest and podcaster	

== Law ==
Name	Class year	Notability	Reference(s)
Thomas C. Lynch	1922	District attorney in San Francisco and attorney general of California (1964–1971)	
Ming Chin	1960	Associate justice of the Supreme Court of California	
Tony West	1983	17th United States associate attorney general and current chief legal officer of Uber	
John B. Owens	1989	United States Court of Appeals for the Ninth Circuit judge	

== Military ==
Name	Class year	Notability	Reference(s)
Scott McKean	1986	Lieutenant general in the United States Army, deputy commanding general for Army Futures Command; previously chief of staff for United States Central Command	

== Politicians ==
Name	Class year	Notability	Reference(s)
A. P. Hamann	1926	City manager of San Jose (1950–1969)	
Tom McEnery	1963	61st mayor of San Jose	
John Vasconcellos	1950	California state senator	
Jim Beall	1970	California state senator	
Mark Boitano	1971	New Mexico state senator (1997–2015)	
Dave Cortese	1975	California state senator and former Santa Clara County Board of Supervisors member	
Sam Liccardo	1987	65th mayor of San Jose, California Representative of the 119th United States Congress	
Ralph Alvarado	1988	Kentucky state senator	
Joey Manahan	1989	Hawaii state representative and Honolulu City Councilman	
Dominic Caserta	1993	Former Santa Clara city councilmember	
Matt Mahan	2001	66th mayor of San Jose	

== Scientists ==
Name	Class year	Notability	Reference(s)
Jorge Klor de Alva	1966	Anthropologist and author	
Brian Swimme	1972	Cosmologist	

== Miscellaneous notability ==
Name	Class year	Notability	Reference(s)
Brooke Hart	1929	Kidnapping and murder victim, member of Hart family	
