= 1998 San Jose mayoral election =

- June 2, 1998 (first round); November 3, 1998 (runoff)
- Turnout: 40.05% (first round); 56.97% (runoff)
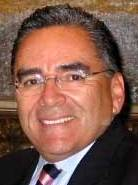

Candidate	Ron Gonzales	Patricia Dando	Kathy Chavez Napoli
Party	Democratic	Nonpartisan	Nonpartisan
First-round vote	55,699	46,097	14,220
First-round percentage	41.61%	34.44%	10.62%
Second-round vote	93,586	89,293
Second-round percentage	47.31%	45.14%
Mayor before election
Susan Hammer
Democratic
Elected mayor
Ron Gonzales
Democratic

The 1998 San Jose mayoral election was held on June 2 and November 3, 1998, to elect the Mayor of San Jose, California. It saw the election of Ron Gonzales.

Incumbent mayor Susan Hammer was term limited.

Because no candidate managed to receive a majority of the vote in the initial round of the election, a runoff election was held between the first round's top-two finishers.

== Candidates ==
Advanced to runoff

- Patricia Dando, San Jose city councilor
- Ron Gonzales, Santa Clara County supervisor

Eliminated in first round

- Bill Chew, candidate for mayor in 1990 and 1994
- Kathy Napoli, businesswoman

== Results ==
=== First round ===
First round results
Party	Candidate	Votes	%
Democratic	Ron Gonzales	55,699	41.61
Nonpartisan	Patricia Dando	46,097	34.44
Nonpartisan	Kathy Chavez Napoli	14,220	10.62
Nonpartisan	Bill Chew	5,462	4.08
Write-in		12,374	9.25
Total votes		133,852	100.00
Turnout		40.05	

Runoff results
Party	Candidate	Votes	%
Democratic	Ron Gonzales	93,586	47.31
Nonpartisan	Patricia Dando	89,293	45.14
Write-in		14,935	7.55
Total votes		197,814	100.00
Turnout		56.97	
