= 1978 San Jose mayoral election =

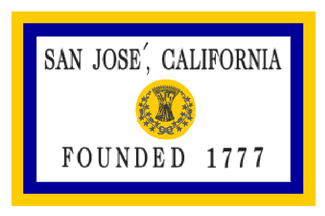
- June 6, 1978 (first round); November 7, 1978 (runoff)
- Turnout: 59.31% (first round); 66.79% (runoff)
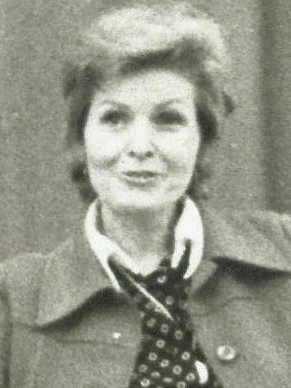

Candidate	Janet Gray Hayes	Alfredo Garza Jr.
Party	Democratic	Nonpartisan
First-round vote	68,643	55,093
First-round percentage	48.77%	39.14%
Second-round vote	107,872	44,358
Second-round percentage	70.86%	29.14%
Candidate	John Russell
Party	Nonpartisan
First-round vote	9,044
First-round percentage	6.43%
Mayor before election
Janet Gray Hayes
Democratic
Elected mayor
Janet Gray Hayes
Democratic

The 1978 San Jose mayoral election was held to elect the mayor of San Jose, California. It saw an initial election held on June 6, 1978, followed by a runoff election on November 7, 1978, after no candidate managed to obtain a majority in the initial election. The runoff was won by incumbent mayor Janet Gray Hayes.

== Candidates ==
Advanced to runoff

- Janet Gray Hayes, incumbent mayor
- Alfredo Garza Jr., San Jose city councilor and candidate for mayor in 1974

Eliminated in first round

- Claudette Begin
- John Russel
- Ben Golf Trevinu

== Campaign ==
Incumbent mayor Janet Gray Hayes campaigned almost exclusively on her support for controlling growth by placing restrictions on both the amount and location of new units of housing in the city. Her runoff opponent, Alfredo Garza Jr., had been on the opposite side of the issue both as a mayoral candidate and as a city council member, supporting more rapid growth in the city, being considered a member of the council's "let's-grow-faster" bloc. The issue of whether or not to mitigate growth was a hotly contested issue in the city's politics ahead of the election. The City Council, in August, fired city manager Ted Tedesco over his attempts to control the rate of development in the city, with Garza being one of the City Council members who voted to fire him. Garza was believed to have been the main force behind the firing of Tedesco, and Hayes was greatly upset with Tedesco's firing. The election was seen as giving a strong mandate to controlling the rate of growth. Hayes, staking out this position, won an overwhelming victory in the runoff over an opponent with the opposing stance. Additionally, in the coinciding city council elections, Joe Colla, a longtime member of the council who was part of the "let's-grow-faster" bloc, notably lost reelection.

Garza, as a chicano (Mexican-American), was aiming to be the first such mayor of the city. Mexican Americans, at the time, comprised as much as 25% of the city's electorate. Neither the city, nor any other major Californian city, had had a Latino mayor since California obtained statehood in 1850, and this would remain the case until Ron Gonzales was elected mayor of San Jose in 1998.

Hayes was among very few female mayors in office at the time in the United States.

== Results ==
=== General election ===
1978 San Jose mayoral general election
Party	Candidate	Votes	%
Democratic	Janet Gray Hayes (incumbent)	68,643	48.77
Nonpartisan	Alfredo Garza Jr.	55,093	39.14
Nonpartisan	John Russell	9,044	6.43
Nonpartisan	Ben Golf Trevinu	5,208	3.70
Nonpartisan	Claudette Begin	2,769	1.97
Total votes		140,757	100.00

=== Runoff ===
1978 San Jose mayoral runoff election
Party	Candidate	Votes	%
Democratic	Janet Gray Hayes (incumbent)	107,872	70.86
Nonpartisan	Alfredo Garza Jr.	44,358	29.14
Total votes		152,230	100.00
