= Frank Fiscalini =

American politician and educator (1922–2023)

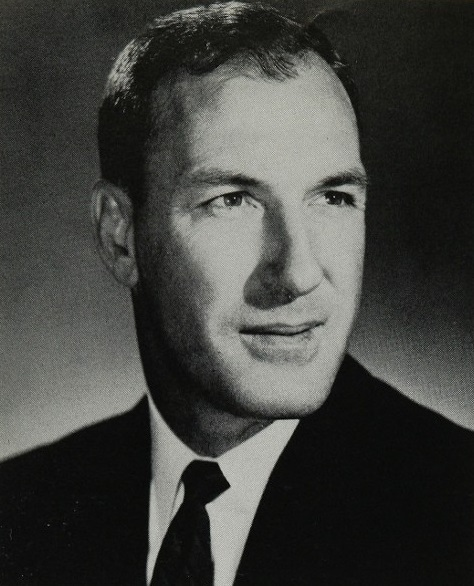
- Fiscalini c. 1963

Vice Mayor of San Jose
- In office 1998–2000

San Jose City Councilor from District 6
- In office 1992–2000

Superintendent of East Side Union High School District
- In office 1956–1982

Personal details
- Born: November 26, 1922 San Bernardino, California, U.S.
- Died: December 8, 2023 (aged 101) San Jose, California, U.S.
- Party: Democratic
- Spouse: Joan Fiscalini
- Children: 4
- Education: Santa Clara University (BA); Stanford University (MEd); University of Northern Colorado (EdD)

Military service
- Branch/service: United States Army
- Battles/wars: World War II

Frank Fiscalini (November 26, 1922 – December 8, 2023) was an American politician and educator. He served on the San Jose City Council as Vice Mayor and led the East Side Union High School District as superintendent for more than 20 years.

== Early life and education ==
Frank Fiscalini was born in San Bernardino, California, on November 26, 1922. His parents, both immigrants from Northern Italy, were a railroad carpenter and ran a grocery store while raising six other children. He attended San Bernardino High School before moving to the Bay Area in 1942 to attend Santa Clara University on a baseball scholarship. He enlisted in the army during World War II, but would return to and graduate from Santa Clara. He later earned a master's degree in education from Stanford University and doctorate of education development and management from University of Northern Colorado.

== Career ==
Fiscalini was a teacher at Bellarmine College Preparatory before moving to James Lick High School in 1952 in the East Side Union High School District as one of the founding teachers. After six years, he became an assistant principal, then principal, and then served as district's first superintendent from 1956 to 1982, during which the district added 10 new schools. Sal Pizarro of The Mercury News credited him with "essentially building" the district.

After that, he became the CEO of the Alexian Brothers hospital system and worked there for five years. Fiscalini also led the restoration of Cathedral Basilica of St. Joseph in San Jose and helped found Opera San José, serving as its board president, leading to his nickname, "San Jose’s own Renaissance Man".

In 1990, he ran in the San Jose Mayoral election, winning a plurality in the first round, but narrowly lost the runoff to Susan Hammer by less than 2,000 votes. He then ran for and won the San Jose City Council District 6 seat in 1992, serving two four-year terms, including being vice mayor.

== Personal life ==
Fiscalini met his wife, Joan, at San Bernardino Valley College and married her after he returned from service during World War II. They had four children.

Fiscalini turned 100 in 2022, which was marked by a car parade of vintage Ford Model A's. He died on December 8, 2023, at the age of 101.
