= 1982 San Jose mayoral election =

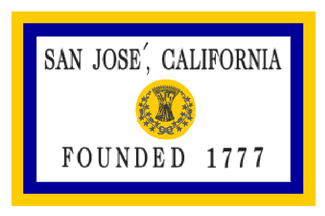
- June 8, 1982
- Turnout: 43.8%

Candidate	Tom McEnery	Claude Fletcher
Party	Democratic	Nonpartisan
Popular vote	66,494	37,246
Percentage	60.61%	33.95%
Candidate	Tom Tomasko
Party	Nonpartisan
Popular vote	5,972
Percentage	5.44%
Mayor before election
Janet Gray Hayes
Democratic
Elected mayor
Tom McEnery
Democratic

The 1982 San Jose mayoral election was held on June 8, 1982, to elect the mayor of San Jose, California. Tom McEnery was elected. Because McEnrery won an outright majority in the initial round of the election, no runoff election needed to be held.

Incumbent mayor Janet Gray Hayes was term limited.

== Candidates ==
- Claude Fletcher, member of the San Jose City Council since 1980 and Republican nominee for the California State Assembly district 24 in 1976
- Tom McEnery, member of the San Jose City Council and former chairman of the San Jose Planning Commission
- Tom Tomasko

== Results ==
Results
Party	Candidate	Votes	%
Democratic	Tom McEnery	66,494	60.61
Nonpartisan	Claude Fletcher	37,246	33.95
Nonpartisan	Tom Tomasko	5,972	5.44
Total votes		109,712	100.00
