= Electoral history of Zoe Lofgren =

Elections featuring Zoe Lofgren as a candidate

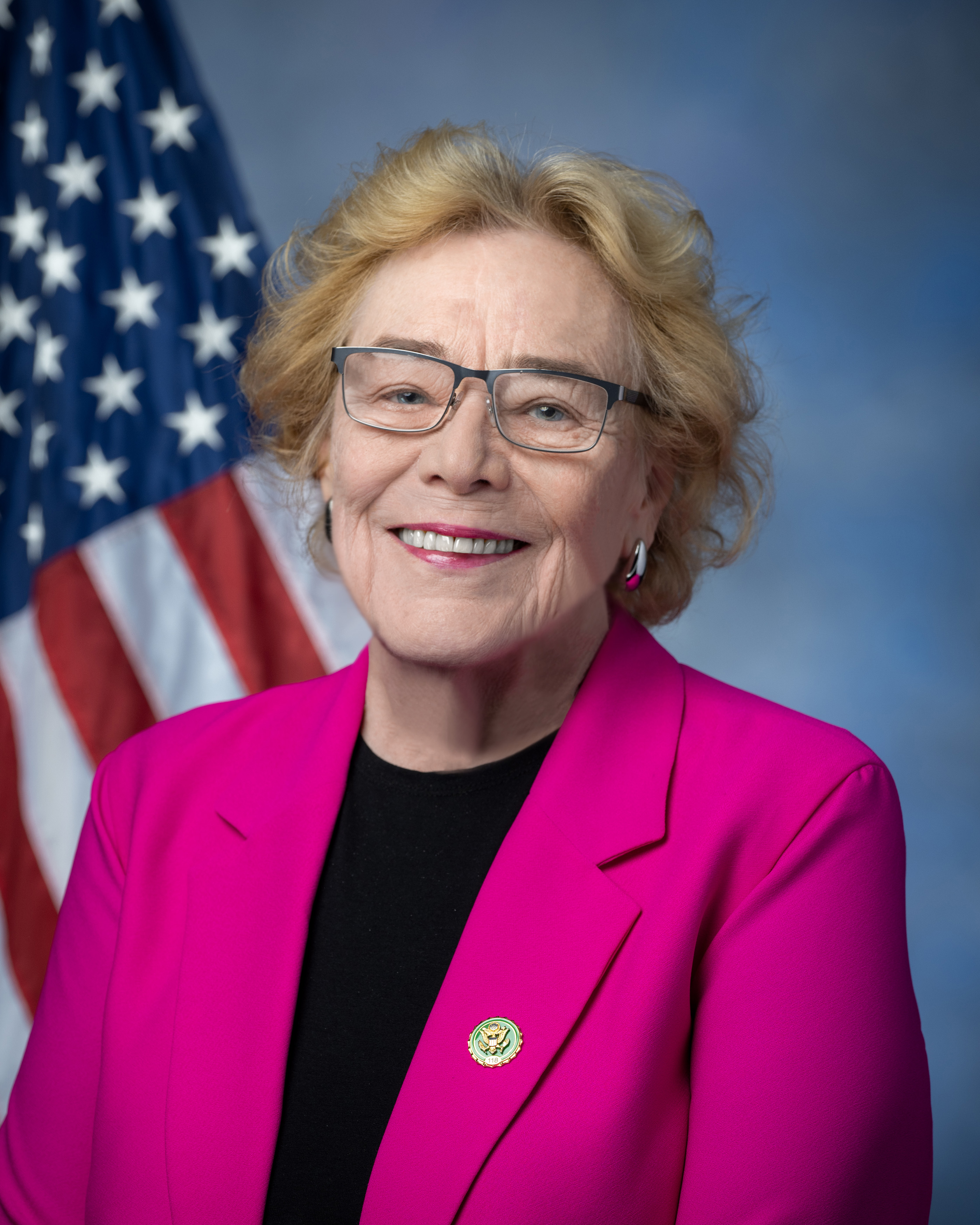
Official portrait, 2024

Susan Ellen "Zoe" Lofgren (/ˈzoʊ ˈlɒfɡrɪn/ ZOH LOF-grin; born December 21, 1947) is an American politician and lawyer serving as a U.S. representative from California. A member of the Democratic Party, Lofgren is in her 16th term in Congress, having been first elected in 1994. Lofgren has long served on the House Judiciary Committee, and chaired the House Administration Committee in the 116th and 117th Congresses.

== U.S. House of Representatives ==
=== California's 16th congressional district ===
California's 16th congressional district Democratic Primary election, June 7, 1994
| Party | Candidate | Votes | % |
|---|---|---|---|
| Democratic | Zoe Lofgren | 16,168 | 45.3 |
| Democratic | Tom McEnery | 15,037 | 42.2 |
| Democratic | Dick Lane | 1,537 | 4.3 |
| Democratic | Cynthia Williamson | 1,414 | 4.0 |
| Democratic | Tom Harney | 780 | 2.2 |
| Democratic | Edward R. Dykes | 721 | 2.0 |
| Total votes | | 35,657 | 100.0 |
| Turnout | | | |

California's 16th congressional district election, 1994
| Party | Candidate | Votes | % |
|---|---|---|---|
| Democratic | Zoe Lofgren | 74,935 | 65.0 |
| Republican | Lyle J. Smith | 40,409 | 35.0 |
| No party | Fred Luke Barraza (write-in) | 8 | 0.0 |
| Total votes | | 115,352 | 100.0 |
| Turnout | | | |
| Democratic hold | | | |

California's 16th congressional district election, 1996
| Party | Candidate | Votes | % |
|---|---|---|---|
| Democratic | Zoe Lofgren (incumbent) | 94,020 | 65.7 |
| Republican | Chuck Wojslaw | 43,197 | 30.2 |
| Libertarian | David Bonino | 4,124 | 2.8 |
| Natural Law | Abaan Abu-Shumays | 1,866 | 1.3 |
| Total votes | | 143,207 | 100.0 |
| Turnout | | | |
| Democratic hold | | | |

California's 16th congressional district election, 1998
| Party | Candidate | Votes | % |
|---|---|---|---|
| Democratic | Zoe Lofgren (incumbent) | 85,503 | 72.82 |
| Republican | Horace Eugene Thayn | 27,494 | 23.42 |
| Natural Law | John H. Black | 4,417 | 3.76 |
| Total votes | | 117,414 | 100.0 |
| Turnout | | | |
| Democratic hold | | | |

California's 16th congressional district election, 2000
| Party | Candidate | Votes | % |
|---|---|---|---|
| Democratic | Zoe Lofgren (incumbent) | 115,118 | 72.1 |
| Republican | Horace "Gene" Thayn | 37,213 | 23.3 |
| Libertarian | Dennis Michael Umphress | 4,742 | 3.0 |
| Natural Law | Edward J. Klein | 2,673 | 1.6 |
| Total votes | | 159,746 | 100.0 |
| Turnout | | | |
| Democratic hold | | | |

California's 16th congressional district election, 2002
| Party | Candidate | Votes | % |
|---|---|---|---|
| Democratic | Zoe Lofgren (incumbent) | 72,370 | 67.1 |
| Republican | Douglas Adams McNea | 32,182 | 29.8 |
| Libertarian | Dennis Michael Umphress | 3,434 | 3.1 |
| Total votes | | 104,556 | 100.0 |
| Turnout | | | |
| Democratic hold | | | |

California's 16th congressional district election, 2004
| Party | Candidate | Votes | % |
|---|---|---|---|
| Democratic | Zoe Lofgren (incumbent) | 129,222 | 70.9 |
| Republican | Douglas Adams McNea | 47,992 | 26.4 |
| Libertarian | Markus Welch | 5,067 | 2.7 |
| Total votes | | 182,281 | 100.0 |
| Turnout | | | |
| Democratic hold | | | |

California's 16th congressional district election, 2006
| Party | Candidate | Votes | % |
|---|---|---|---|
| Democratic | Zoe Lofgren (incumbent) | 98,929 | 72.8 |
| Republican | Charel Winston | 37,130 | 27.2 |
| Total votes | | 136,059 | 100.0 |
| Turnout | | | |
| Democratic hold | | | |

California's 16th congressional district election, 2008
| Party | Candidate | Votes | % |
|---|---|---|---|
| Democratic | Zoe Lofgren (incumbent) | 146,481 | 71.3 |
| Republican | Charel Winston | 49,399 | 24.1 |
| Libertarian | Steven Wells | 9,447 | 4.6 |
| Total votes | | 205,327 | 100.0 |
| Turnout | | | |
| Democratic hold | | | |

California's 16th congressional district election, 2010
| Party | Candidate | Votes | % |
|---|---|---|---|
| Democratic | Zoe Lofgren (incumbent) | 105,841 | 67.9 |
| Republican | Daniel Sahagun | 37,913 | 24.3 |
| Libertarian | Edward M. Gonzalez | 12,304 | 7.8 |
| Total votes | | 156,058 | 100.0 |
| Democratic hold | | | |

=== California's 19th congressional district ===
California's 19th congressional district election, 2012
Primary election
| Party | Candidate | Votes | % |
|---|---|---|---|
| Democratic | Zoe Lofgren (incumbent) | 60,726 | 65.2 |
| Republican | Robert Murray | 21,421 | 23.0 |
| Republican | Phat Nguyen | 7,192 | 7.7 |
| No party preference | Jay Cabrera | 3,829 | 4.1 |
| Total votes | | 93,168 | 100.0 |
General election
| Democratic | Zoe Lofgren (incumbent) | 162,300 | 73.2 |
| Republican | Robert Murray | 59,313 | 26.8 |
| Total votes | | 221,613 | 100.0 |
| Democratic hold | | | |

California's 19th congressional district election, 2014
Primary election
| Party | Candidate | Votes | % |
|---|---|---|---|
| Democratic | Zoe Lofgren (incumbent) | 63,845 | 76.0 |
| Democratic | Robert Murray | 20,132 | 24.0 |
| Total votes | | 83,977 | 100.0 |
General election
| Democratic | Zoe Lofgren (incumbent) | 85,888 | 67.2 |
| Democratic | Robert Murray | 41,900 | 32.8 |
| Total votes | | 127,788 | 100.0 |
| Democratic hold | | | |

California's 19th congressional district election, 2016
Primary election
| Party | Candidate | Votes | % |
|---|---|---|---|
| Democratic | Zoe Lofgren (incumbent) | 107,773 | 76.1 |
| Republican | G. Burt Lancaster | 33,889 | 23.9 |
| Total votes | | 194,251 | 100.0 |
General election
| Democratic | Zoe Lofgren (incumbent) | 181,802 | 73.9 |
| Republican | G. Burt Lancaster | 64,061 | 26.1 |
| Total votes | | 245,863 | 100.0 |
| Democratic hold | | | |

California's 19th congressional district election, 2018
Primary election
| Party | Candidate | Votes | % |
|---|---|---|---|
| Democratic | Zoe Lofgren (incumbent) | 97,096 | 99.0 |
| Republican | Justin James Aguilera (write-in) | 792 | 0.8 |
| Republican | Karl Ryan (write-in) | 160 | 0.2 |
| American Independent | Robert Ornelas (write-in) | 7 | 0.0 |
| Total votes | | 98,055 | 100.0 |
General election
| Democratic | Zoe Lofgren (incumbent) | 162,496 | 73.8 |
| Republican | Justin James Aguilera | 57,823 | 26.2 |
| Total votes | | 220,319 | 100.0 |
| Democratic hold | | | |

California's 19th congressional district election, 2020
Primary election
| Party | Candidate | Votes | % |
|---|---|---|---|
| Democratic | Zoe Lofgren (incumbent) | 104,456 | 62.7 |
| Republican | Justin James Aguilera | 20,469 | 12.3 |
| Republican | Ignacio Cruz | 19,109 | 11.5 |
| Democratic | Ivan Torres | 18,916 | 11.4 |
| No party preference | Jason Mallory | 3,516 | 2.1 |
| Total votes | | 166,466 | 100.0 |
General election
| Democratic | Zoe Lofgren (incumbent) | 224,385 | 71.7 |
| Republican | Justin James Aguilera | 88,642 | 28.3 |
| Total votes | | 313,027 | 100.0 |
| Democratic hold | | | |

=== California's 18th congressional district ===
California's 18th congressional district, 2022
Primary election
| Party | Candidate | Votes | % |
|---|---|---|---|
| Democratic | Zoe Lofgren (incumbent) | 50,104 | 56.1 |
| Republican | Peter Hernandez | 27,935 | 31.3 |
| Democratic | Luis Acevedo-Arreguin | 11,253 | 12.6 |
| Total votes | | 89,292 | 100.0 |
General election
| Democratic | Zoe Lofgren (incumbent) | 99,677 | 65.8 |
| Republican | Peter Hernandez | 51,704 | 34.2 |
| Total votes | | 151,381 | 100.0 |

California's 18th congressional district, 2024
Primary election
| Party | Candidate | Votes | % |
|---|---|---|---|
| Democratic | Zoe Lofgren (incumbent) | 49,370 | 51.2 |
| Republican | Peter Hernandez | 31,665 | 32.8 |
| Democratic | Charlene Nijmeh | 10,631 | 11.0 |
| Democratic | Lawrence Milan | 2,714 | 2.8 |
| Democratic | Luele Kifle | 2,034 | 2.1 |
| Total votes | | 96,414 | 100.0 |
General election
| Democratic | Zoe Lofgren (incumbent) | 147,674 | 64.4 |
| Republican | Peter Hernandez | 80,832 | 35.4 |
| Total votes | | 228,506 | 100.0 |
