= Michael Dowd (police officer) =

Former police officer

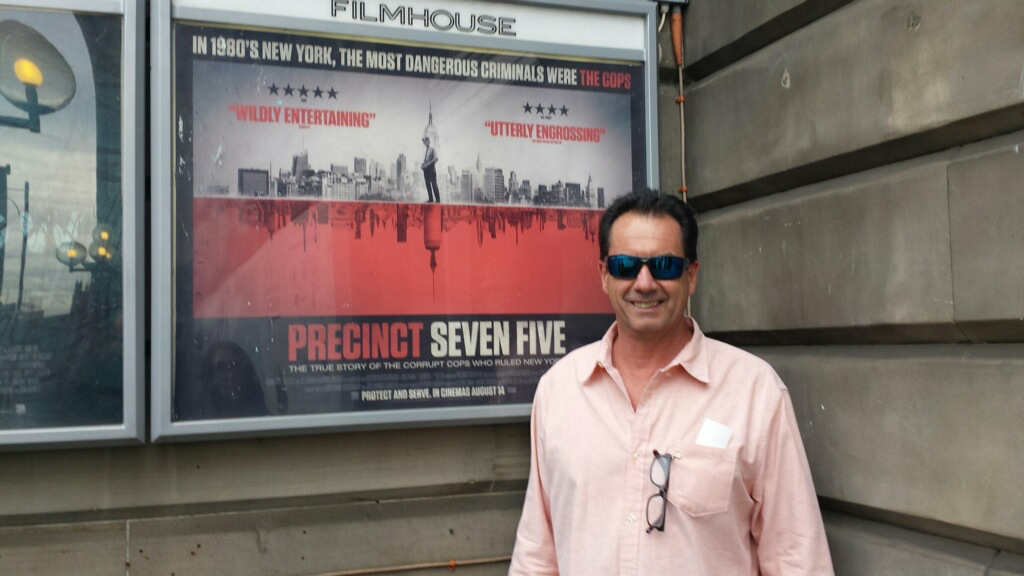
- Dowd at the Edinburgh premiere of Precinct Seven Five in 2015
- Born: January 10, 1961 (age 65); New York City, U.S.
- Education: New York City Police Academy
- Spouse: Bonnie Dowd
- Police career
- Allegiance: United States
- Department: New York City Police Department
- Service years: 1982–92
- Badge no.: 22310
- Other work: Police consultant; actor
- Website: www.themikedowd.com

Michael F. Dowd (born January 10, 1961) is a former New York City Police Department (NYPD) officer, drug distributor, and enforcer for the Dominican American Diaz criminal organization who was arrested in 1992 for running a drug ring out of Suffolk County, Long Island, New York. He is the subject of the 2014 documentary film The Seven Five directed by Tiller Russell and produced by Eli Holzman. The Tiller Russell TV documentary version, Precinct Seven Five (2015), aired on Film4 on June 19, 2020, and also featured interviews with Dowd's co-conspirator and "dirty cop" friend Kenneth "Kenny" Eurell, who eventually became a cooperating Federal witness and wore a wire, in order to further incriminate Dowd and help corroborate his own testimony in exchange for a lenient sentence at trial.

== Early life and education ==
Dowd was born on January 10, 1961, in Brooklyn, New York City, the third of seven children in an Irish Catholic family. He grew up in Brentwood, Long Island, on a block mostly populated by the families of police officers and firefighters. According to Dowd, he was a good student in high school. According to Dowd, his father was Irish and his mother Jewish.

== Career ==
Dowd graduated from the New York City Police Academy in 1982 and was originally assigned to a precinct in Queens, NY, for a year and a half, after which he was reassigned to the 75th Precinct in East New York, Brooklyn.

=== Prison sentence ===
In the course of his career, Dowd committed a host of crimes, including conspiring with drug traffickers to distribute cocaine, warning drug dealers about upcoming raids, providing them with guns and badges, allegedly planning to abduct a woman in Queens, and stealing food meant for the needy at a church. Dowd located a man who robbed the Diaz drug cartel and instead of arresting him turned him over to Diaz. He pocketed several thousand dollars a week as a result of corrupt arrangements.

Dowd was arrested in 1992. After investigations by the Suffolk County Police, the DEA, and NYPD's internal affairs, Dowd was convicted of racketeering and conspiracy to distribute narcotics and sent to prison for his crimes. He cooperated with the Mollen Commission, which investigated allegations of corruption in the NYPD.

Sentenced to 16 years in prison, Dowd served 12 years and 5 months. While he was in prison, Dowd claimed he worked as a peer counselor, worked out, read, and ran the addiction and suicide prevention programs.

=== Recent career ===
Dowd has been featured on podcasts, periodicals, broadcast radio and television programs, and was the subject of the documentary film The Seven Five. A narrative feature adaptation by Sony Pictures is being produced by John Lesher and Megan Ellison.
