= 1974 San Jose mayoral election =

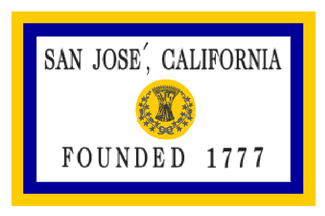
- June 4, 1974 (first round); November 5, 1974 (runoff)
- Turnout: 47.22% (first round); 59.51% (runoff)
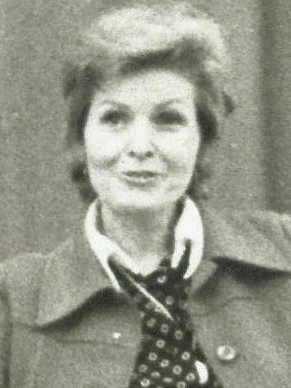

Candidate	Janet Gray Hayes	Barton L. Collins
Party	Democratic	Nonpartisan
First-round vote	35,901	33,216
First-round percentage	36.93%	34.17%
Second-round vote	65,929	64,251
Second-round percentage	50.64%	49.36%
Candidate	Alfredo Garza Jr.	Peter B. Venuto
Party	Nonpartisan	Nonpartisan
First-round vote	13,852	7,744
First-round percentage	14.25%	7.97%
Mayor before election
Norman Mineta
Democratic
Elected mayor
Janet Gray Hayes
Democratic

The 1974 San Jose mayoral election was held to elect the mayor of San Jose, California. It saw an initial election held on June 4, 1974, followed by a runoff election on November 5, 1974, after no candidate managed to obtain a majority in the initial election. The runoff was won by Janet Gray Hayes, who became the first female mayor of the city, making San Jose the first United States city of more than 500,000 residents to elect a female mayor.

While incumbent mayor Norman Mineta had been eligible to seek reelection to a second term, he instead opted to run for the United States House of Representatives.

== Candidates ==
Advanced to runoff

- Barton L. Collins, former chief of detectives of the San Jose Police Department
- Janet Gray Hayes, vice mayor of San Jose since 1973 and San Jose city councilor since 1971

Eliminated in first-round

- Paul K. Colvard
- Alfredo Garza Jr., San Jose city councilor since 1971
- Paul Moore
- Robbie Robertson
- Peter B. Venuto

== Campaign ==
San Jose was considered to be the fastest growing city in California at the time the election took place.

The runoff campaign was regarded as very contentious and negative.

Collins initially accused Hayes of being sacred to debate him face-to-face. However, when the League of Women Voters attempted to organize televised debates between the two candidates during the runoff campaign, Collins refused to participate in any debate which featured a black or Mexican-American panelist. When he was accused of racism for this, Collins denied it, giving the excuse that he only did not one to do so because he believed questions that would be "prejudiced " against him might be asked by such a panelist, since claimed that he had once arrested a community leader of one of those two ethnic groups.

During the campaign, Collins alleged that Hayes had voted in favor of a developer's project after receiving a $500 campaign contribution the developer, accusing her of having had a conflict of interest. Despite him trying to tie her to developers, local developers were reported to actually have unfavorable opinions of both Hayes and Collins. Developers reportedly felt that Collins did not have a grasp on the concerns developers had about strict city controls over development. Developers also were unhappy with the position that Hayes had staked out in favor of controlled growth in the city.

Collins had served 38 years on the city's police force, and his only previous experience in politics was an unsuccessful effort he had made, in partnership with downtown businessmen and real estate interests, to pressure the San Jose City Council to appoint him the city's police chief after Ray Blackmore retired.

== Results ==
=== General election ===
1974 San Jose mayoral general election
Party	Candidate	Votes	%
Democratic	Janet Gray Hayes	35,901	36.93
Nonpartisan	Barton L. Collins	33,216	34.17
Nonpartisan	Alfredo Garza Jr.	13,852	14.25
Nonpartisan	Peter B. Venuto	7,744	7.97
Nonpartisan	Paul K. Colvard	2,598	2.67
Nonpartisan	Paul Moore	2,466	2.54
Nonpartisan	G. A. "Robbie" Robertson	1,429	1.47
Total votes		97,206	100.00

=== Runoff ===
1974 San Jose mayoral runoff election
Party	Candidate	Votes	%
Democratic	Janet Gray Hayes	65,929	50.64
Nonpartisan	Barton L. Collins	64,251	49.36
Total votes		130,180	100.00
