= Ken Eurell =

American criminal

Kenneth Eurell (born November 1960) is a former New York City Police Department police officer and associate of the Adam Diaz drug organization, was arrested in May of 1992 for running a drug ring out of Suffolk County, Long Island. The charges were upgraded to RICO in the United States District Court for the Southern District of New York. Eurell cooperated with federal authorities in the arrests of his former partner Michael Dowd and drug associates. He is a subject of the 2014 documentary film The Seven Five directed by Tiller Russell and produced by Eli Holzman.

== Early life ==
Eurell was born in Ozone Park, Queens, New York. He moved to Rosedale in Queens, New York with his parents at the age of 3. He attended St. Clare's Elementary Catholic school grades 1 through 8. Grades 9 through 12 he attended St. Agnes High in the town of Rockville Centre, located in Nassau County, New York.

== Career ==
=== Documentary ===
Eurell appears as himself in the documentary The Seven Five, which was purchased by Sony Pictures and produced by John Lesher and Megan Ellison.

=== Co-author ===
Eurell, Frank Girardot and Burl Barer co-authored the true crime novel Betrayal In Blue: The Shocking Memoir Of The Scandal That Rocked The NYPD published by Wild Blue Press.

=== Recent career ===
Eurell has been featured on many podcasts, periodicals, radio and television programs.

Eurell has a YouTube channel where he discusses police corruption.

== Sources ==
- Interview on the Mike Calta show from 102.5 Tampa Bay The Bone
- Interview on The Artie Lange Show w/ Ken Eurell
- Interview Wrong Reel w/ Ken Eurell
- Interview Death, Sex & Money w/ Ken Eurell
- Spectrum Culture article on Eurell
- DeadLine article on Eurell
- Review by vulture.com
- Murphy, Doyle (November 13, 2014). "Coke, corruption and videotape: Rogue cop Michael Dowd returns in documentary". NY Daily News.
- Variety article on Eurell
- Eyeforfilm.com article on Eurell
