= Jorge Klor de Alva =

Mexican anthropologist

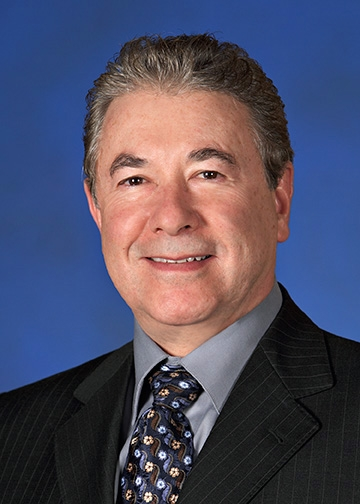
- Born: José Jorge Klor de Alva; May 28, 1948 (age 78); Mexico City, Mexico
- Education: University of California, Berkeley
- Occupations: President, Nexus Research and Policy Center

José Jorge Klor de Alva, is a Mexican-born anthropologist, the president of Nexus Research and Policy Center, an independent research and policy advocacy organization for the improvement of college education of nontraditional and underserved students. He is also chairman of 3DMX, Inc., a technology company in Silicon Valley that focuses, through its Mexico-based University of Advanced Technologies, on education and training programs in digital and advanced manufacturing technologies. He was previously the Class of 1940 Professor at UC-Berkeley and Professor of Anthropology at Princeton University.

== Childhood and education ==
J. Jorge Klor de Alva, was born May 28, 1948, in Mexico City. His parents were Maria de los Angeles de Alva, born in San Luis Potosi, and Charles W. Klor, who emigrated with his family to California from Russia in 1915. After WWII his father continued to Mexico, but returned to the U.S. when Klor de Alva was four years old. By 1957 Klor de Alva migrated to the U.S. with his mother and two siblings hoping to rejoin his father. Within a year after their arrival in San Jose, California, his father abandoned the family and Klor de Alva and his older brother began to work in the fields of the agricultural community. He continued working during the school year, and summers throughout his elementary and high school years.

After graduating from Bellarmine College Preparatory, he enrolled in the University of California, Berkeley. He earned his bachelor's degree in philosophy and then a Juris Doctor degree from Berkeley, and finally a Ph.D. in history and anthropology at the University of California, Santa Cruz. Having taught himself Nahuatl, the language spoken by the Aztecs, his doctoral thesis, under the direction of Miguel León-Portilla, examined native resistance to Christianity in 16th century Mexico.

== Academic career ==
His first academic position was at San Jose State University as Assistant and Associate Professor of Philosophy/Humanities/Mexican American Graduate Studies, (1971–82). He then worked at University of California-Santa Cruz as Visiting Associate Professor of History, (1980–82), and then at SUNY-Albany as Associate Professor of Anthropology and Latin American Studies(1982–89)

From 1989–94 he was Professor of Anthropology at Princeton University. From 1994 to 1998 he held the Class of 1940 Endowed Chair at the University of California, Berkeley

His scholarly research has been on contemporary and early modern interethnic/interracial relations, education policy and curriculum reform, and cultural and social trends, primarily in North America, Europe, and Africa. He has published over eighty scholarly articles, is co-author of nine textbooks, and has written or edited another fifteen books on related subjects. His most recent books include In the Language of Kings (WW Norton: 2001) and The Americans (McDougal Littell: 2007 [latest edition]).

== Business career ==
From 1971 to 2014 Klor de Alva worked with and advised John Sperling on the founding and development, first, of the Institute for Professional Development and, second, the University of Phoenix and Apollo Group (later renamed Apollo Education Group) and Senior Vice President and Board member of Apollo Group, Inc., the holding company of the for-profit university. He was a member of the boards of directors of Apollo Group and the University of Phoenix from 1991 to 2003, and until September 2000, was President of the University of Phoenix. He retired from Apollo Group, Inc. in 2011.

He re-joined University of Phoenix/Apollo Group in the Fall of 2005 as President of Latin American Operations and Sr. Vice President of International Operations.

He founded Apollo International while President of the University of Phoenix, focused on providing remote education programs outside the U.S. It was a global education company that served over 170,000 students before its sale in 2005. He served as both Chairman and CEO of the Pitagoras-Apollo International joint venture in Brazil, which went public as KROTON in Brazil's BOVESPA exchange. At the time he sold the company in 2005 to re-join University of Phoenix, Apollo International had over 170,000 K-12 and higher education students.

== Professional experience ==
- 2011- President, Nexus Research and Policy Center
- 2007–2011 Senior Vice President, Academic Excellence, University of Phoenix; Director, UOP National Research Center
- 2005–2007 President, Latin America Operations, Apollo Group, Inc.
- 2000–2005 Chairman, President, CEO, Apollo International, Inc. Chairman of the Board, Pitagoras Apollo International, Ltda.
- 1998–2000 President, University of Phoenix
- 1998–2000 Senior Vice President, Apollo Group, Inc.
- 1996–98 Vice President, Business Development, Apollo Group, Incy.

== Public service ==
Klor de Alva is the former Treasurer of the California Council for the Humanities and a member of the Smithsonian Institution Council, he was on the editorial board of Culturefront, the magazine of the New York Council for the Humanities, and was a member of the Cultural Committee of the Consulate General of Mexico in San Francisco and of the board of the American Association for Higher Education. He also served as a board member of the American Association of Higher Education and on the Advisory Council on Education and Human Resources of the National Science Foundation.

== Publications ==
=== Books and textbooks ===
- 1972 Introduction to Mexican Philosophy. Spartan Books, San Jose, California.
- 1974 (Editor) Administration of Justice and the Spanish Speaking Community. Spartan Books, San Jose, California.
- 1974 Philosophy, Personality, and Chicanos. Marfel Series in Human Behavior and the Environment. Marfel Associates, Denver.
- 1976 Philosophy, Personality and Language: Mexicans and Mexican Americans. Spartan Books, San Jose, California.
- 1985 (co-edited with L. B. Brown and J. Oliver) Sociocultural and Service Issues in Working and Hispanic American Clients. Rockefeller College Press, Albany.
- 1988 (co-edited with H. B. Nicholson and Eloise Quiñones Keber) The Work of Bernardino de Sahagún: Pioneer Ethnographer of Sixteenth-Century Aztec Mexico. SUNY-A Institute for Mesoamerican Studies, Studies on Culture and Society. University of Texas Press, Austin.
- 1992 (co-edited with Miguel León-Portilla, et al.) Imágenes interétnicas: De palabra y obra en el Nuevo Mundo. Vol. 1. Ediciones Siglo XXI, Madrid.
- 1992 (co-edited with Miguel León-Portilla, et al.) Encuentros interétnicos: De palabra y obra en el Nuevo Mundo. Vol. 2. Ediciones Siglo XXI, Madrid.
- 1992 (edited, introduced and revised.) The Aztec Image of Self and Society: Introduction to Nahua Culture. by Miguel León-Portilla. Edited with an introduction by J. J. Klor de Alva. University of Utah Press, Salt Lake City.
- 1993 (co-edited with Miguel León-Portilla, et al.) La formación del otro: De palabra y obra en el Nuevo Mundo. Vol. 3. Ediciones Siglo XXI, Madrid.
- 1994 (co-authored with Gary Nash and Luis Wilson) Houghton Mifflin Social Studies Series (HMSSS), Grades 1 through 6
- 1995 (co-edited with Miguel León-Portilla, et al.) Tramas de la identidad: De palabra y obra en el Nuevo Mundo. Vol. 4. Ediciones Siglo XXI, Madrid.
- 1999 (co-authored with Luis Wilson and Nancy Woloch)The Americans: Reconstruction Through the 20th Century. McDougal Littell, Evanston, Illinois. (And Teacher's Ed., 1999.)
- 2001 (co-edited with Earl Shorris and Miguel Leon-Portilla) The Language of Kings: An Anthology of Indigenous Mesoamerican Literatures. W. W. Norton, New York.
- 2007 (co-authored with Luis Wilson and Nancy Woloch) The Americans. McDougal Littell, Evanston, Illinois. (First ed. and Teacher's Edition, First ed., 1998.)

=== Curatorial experience: museums and exhibitions ===
- 1974 Co-organizer, Mexican Museum. San Francisco, California.
- 1990–92 Member, Comisión Asesora (Coordinating Committee), Instituto de las Américas/Museo de América, Ministry of Culture, Madrid, Spain.
  - 1990–92 Head Curator: Exhibit on "Ciencias y Culturas: De Pané a Carlos III" (tentative title).
  - 1990–92 Head Curator: Exhibit on "La Mirada Europea y las Culturas Americanas: Siglo XVI".
  - 1990–92 Head Curator: Exhibit on "Memoria e Invención: Mexicanos/Chicanos en los Estados Unidos".
- 1990–92 Member, Comité de Expertos, Pabellón de los Descubrimientos, Oficina del Comisario, Expo-92, Seville, Spain. (Coordinating Committee of the Pavilion of the Discoveries, Office of the Commissioner, Expo-92 World's Fair.)
- 1990–92 Head Curator: Exhibit on "Nuevos Hombres: De la Antropología a los Derechos Humanos". Responsible for the anthropology/history section of building #1 of the Spanish government's Pabellón de los Descubrimientos ("Pavillon of the Discoveries") at Expo-92, Seville, Spain. Design by Creadores Asociados, S.A., Madrid, Spain. Staging by Confino-Duval, Nîmes, France.

== Honors ==
- 1993–94 Getty Scholar, The Getty Center for the History of Art and the Humanities; Santa Monica, California
- 1993 Fellow of the American Anthropological Association, .
- 1992 Harry Frank Guggenheim Foundation Fellowship
- 1987–88 John Simon Guggenheim Memorial Foundation Fellowship.
