= 2002 San Jose, California, mayoral election =

2002 San Jose mayoral election
- March 5, 2002
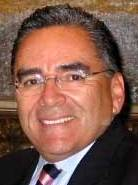

Candidate	Ron Gonzales	J. VanLandingham	Patricia Martinez-Roach
Party	Democratic	Nonpartisan	Nonpartisan
Popular vote	57,315	13,545	10,994
Percentage	56.38%	13.32%	10.81%
Candidate	Jose Posadas	Dale Detwiler	Bill Chew
Party	Nonpartisan	Nonpartisan	Nonpartisan
Popular vote	7,687	6,226	5,890
Percentage	7.56%	6.12%	5.79%
Mayor before election
Ron Gonzales
Democratic
Elected mayor
Ron Gonzales
Democratic

The 2002 San Jose mayoral election was held on March 5, 2002, to elect the mayor of San Jose, California. It saw the reelection of Ron Gonzales.

Because Gonzales won an outright majority in the initial round of the election, no runoff election needed to be held.

== Results ==
Results
Party	Candidate	Votes	%
Democratic	Ron Gonzales (incumbent)	57,315	56.38
Nonpartisan	J. VanLandingham	13,545	13.32
Nonpartisan	Patricia Martinez-Roach	10,994	10.81
Nonpartisan	Jose Posadas	7,687	7.56
Nonpartisan	Dale Detwiler	6,226	6.12
Nonpartisan	Bill Chew	5,890	5.79
Total votes		101,657	100.00
