= Kyle Krpata =

American soccer player

Personal information
- Full name: Kyle C. Krpata
- Date of birth: January 23, 1971 (age 55)
- Place of birth: Santa Clara, California, U.S.
- Height: 6 ft 1 in (1.85 m)
- Position: Goalkeeper

College career
| Years | Team | Apps | (Gls) |
| 1989–1992 | Stanford Cardinal | | |

Senior career*
| Years | Team | Apps | (Gls) |
| 1993 | Palo Alto Firebirds | | |
| 1994 | San Francisco United All-Blacks | 15 | (0) |
| 1995 | Dallas Sidekicks (indoor) | 11 | (0) |
- * Club domestic league appearances and goals

Kyle Krpata is an American retired soccer goalkeeper who played professionally in the Continental Indoor Soccer League. He was the 1994 USISL Goalkeeper of the Year.

Krpata graduated from Bellarmine College Preparatory. He attended Stanford University, where he played soccer from 1989 to 1992. In 1993, Krpata played for the Palo Alto Firebirds. In 1994, Krpata was selected as USISL Goalkeeper of the Year while playing for the San Francisco United All-Blacks. In 1995, Krpata decided to pursue a legal career and entered Southern Methodist University. The Dallas Sidekicks heard that Krpata was in town and invited him to attend a training camp. He impressed the team enough to gain a contract for the summer of 1995. Krpata retired at the end of the season.
