= Dominic Caserta =

American educator (born 1975)

Member of the Santa Clara City Council
- In office November 2014 – May 2018
- Preceded by: Teresa O'Neill

Personal details
- Born: San Jose, California
- Party: Democratic
- Education: Santa Clara University; San Francisco State University; Bellarmine College Preparatory
- Profession: Teacher/Educator

Dominic Caserta (born 1975) is a former member of the Santa Clara City Council and has been a local educator since 1997.

== Background ==
Caserta is of Portuguese and Italian descent and is a fifth-generation resident of Santa Clara. Caserta is a graduate of Bellarmine College Preparatory, and in 1997, he graduated magna cum laude from Santa Clara University with a Bachelor of Science degree in political science with a minor in American history.

In 2009, Caserta completed the State and Local Officials Executive Program at the John F. Kennedy School of Government at Harvard University.

In 2010, the James Madison Memorial Fellowship Foundation awarded Caserta a fellowship. He used the fellowship to attend San Francisco State University, and earned a master's degree in political science.

Caserta teaches and serves as department chairperson of the Social Sciences Department at Santa Clara High School . He also teaches in the Political Science Departments at De Anza College, Foothill College, San Jose State University, and San Francisco State University.

== Political career ==
On November 5, 2002, Caserta won election to Seat #2 on the Santa Clara City Council. He was re-elected on November 7, 2006. In 2008, Caserta ran for California State Assembly District 22, but lost to Paul Fong in the Democratic primaries. On November 4, 2014, Caserta won election to Seat #5 on the Santa Clara City Council. During his time as Seat #5, Caserta served on multiple committees, including the Ethics Committee. In January 2017, Caserta announced his candidacy to represent District 4 on the Santa Clara County Board of Supervisors.

=== Sexual misconduct allegations ===
Allegations of sexual harassment and misconduct perpetrated by Caserta were first reported on May 8, 2018, after the Santa Clara Unified School District sent an email to all district employees containing his confidential personnel file. The allegations were made in early May 2018 by a former 19 year old campaign volunteer, Lydia Jungkind. Jungkind, a German exchange student, met Caserta while she was studying at Foothill College. Jungkind has accused Caserta of several instances of unwanted sexual advances during her time as a volunteer for Caserta's Board of Supervisor's campaign. In response, Caserta posted a statement on his website suggesting that Jungkind's allegations were politically motivated.

Shortly after allegations against Caserta became public, Caserta told The Mercury News that he had no plans to resign his position on the Santa Clara City Council or withdraw from the Santa Clara Country Supervisor race, and that if anyone perceived his actions as inappropriate that he "apologize[s] for their perception". As a result of the allegations against him, Caserta lost support from the Santa Clara Democratic Party and the South Bay Labor Council.

On May 9, 2018, the San Jose Police Department released a statement asking for victims to come forward and report misconduct by Caserta. In the preceding weeks, 9 individuals made reports against Caserta, ranging from allegations of misconduct to allegations of sexual battery. On August 15, 2018, the Santa Clara County District Attorney's Office announced that Caserta would not face any charges, stating “After a thorough review and legal analysis of Dominic Caserta’s behavior...our office has concluded that there is insufficient evidence to file criminal charges”.

On May 15, 2018, Caserta resigned from the Santa Clara City Council and ended his campaign for Santa Clara County Supervisor.

On January 21, 2019, Caserta voluntarily participated in a polygraph examination "in an attempt to dispel all duplicitous accusations” made against him from Jungkind. On the examination he was reported to have scored 99.9 percent.

On May 1, 2019, it was reported that Caserta had filed a lawsuit against the Santa Clara Unified School District over the damage caused from accidentally sending an email to all district employees containing his personnel file. Caserta requested an unspecified amount in punitive monetary damages from the court.

== Notable initiatives ==
Caserta successfully led the effort to enact a $15 minimum wage by 2019, three years before a minimum wage increase will be mandated by the State of California.

In 2017, Caserta successfully championed a worker retention ordinance for Silicon Valley. The ordinance, first of its kind, received unanimous support from the Santa Clara City Council and will provide job security for food and building service workers in Santa Clara.
