= 1986 San Jose mayoral election =

Mayoral Election in San Jose, California

- June 3, 1986
- Turnout: 31.44%

Candidate	Tom McEnery	Dan Minutillo
Party	Democratic	Nonpartisan
Popular vote	59,459	26,947
Percentage	62.65%	28.39%
Candidate	Greg Nelson
Party	Nonpartisan
Popular vote	5,813
Percentage	6.12%
Mayor before election
Tom McEnery
Democratic
Elected mayor
Tom McEnery
Democratic

The 1986 San Jose mayoral election was held on June 3, 1986, to elect the mayor of San Jose, California. It saw the reelection of Tom McEnery. Because McEnery won an outright majority in the initial round of the election, no runoff election needed to be held.

== Candidates ==
- Dante De Amicis
- Tom McEnery, incumbent mayor
- Dan Minutillo, lawyer
- Greg Nelson

== Results ==
Results
Party	Candidate	Votes	%
Democratic	Tom McEnery (incumbent)	59,459	62.65
Nonpartisan	Dan Minutillo	26,947	28.39
Nonpartisan	Greg Nelson	5,813	6.12
Nonpartisan	Dante De Amicis	2,692	2.84
Total votes		94,911	100.00
