= 1990 San Jose mayoral election =

- June 5, 1990 (first round); November 3, 1990 (runoff)
- Turnout: 37.09% (first round); 52.17% (runoff)
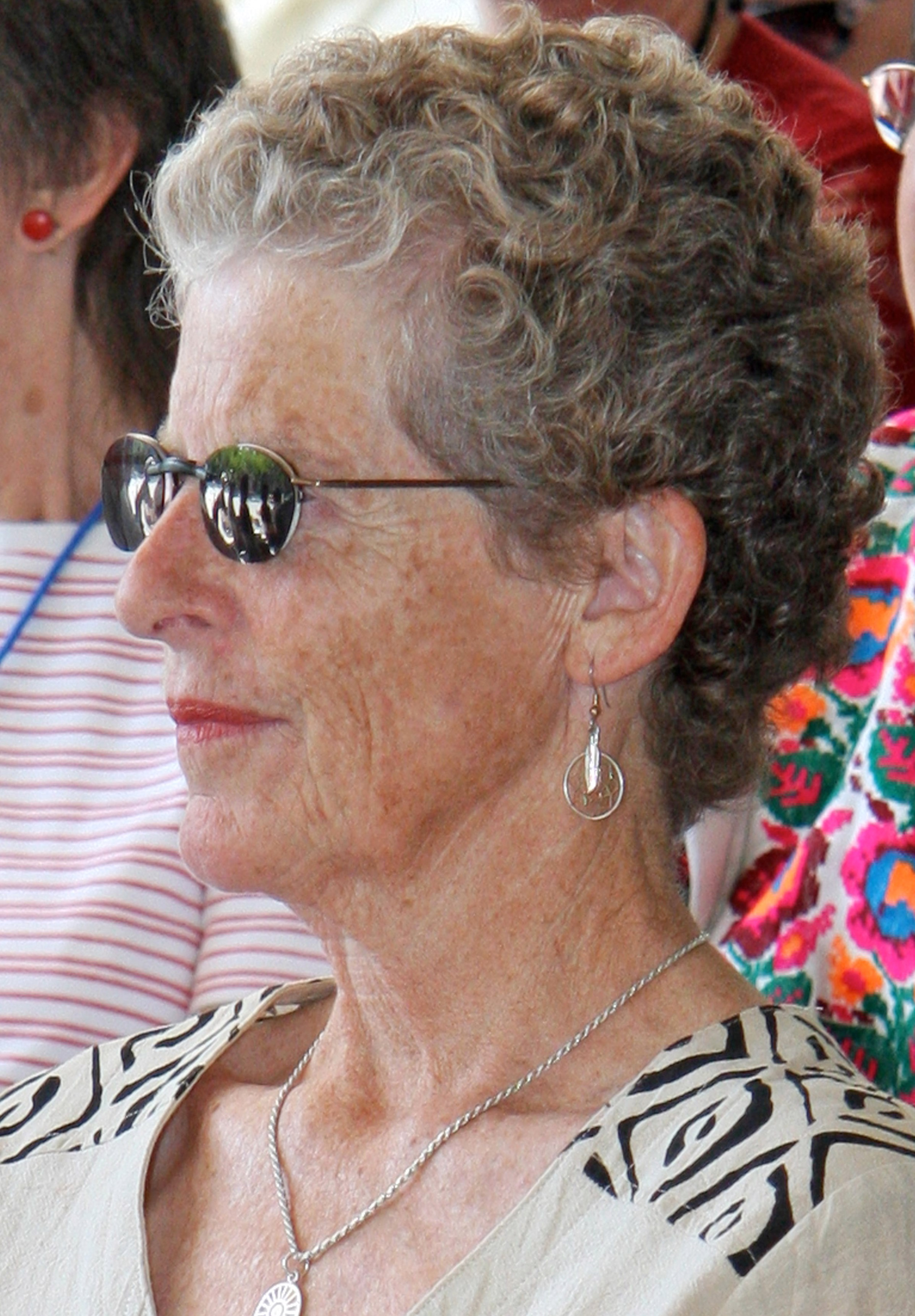

Candidate	Susan Hammer	Frank Fiscalini
Party	Democratic	Nonpartisan
First-round vote	34,822	39,833
First-round percentage	28.89%	33.05%
Second-round vote	89,399	88,016
Second-round percentage	50.39%	49.61%
Candidate	Shirley Lewis	Don Houston
Party	Nonpartisan	Nonpartisan
First-round vote	29,049	9,444
First-round percentage	24.10%	7.84%
Mayor before election
Tom McEnery
Democratic
Elected mayor
Susan Hammer
Democratic

The 1990 San Jose mayoral election was held to elect the mayor of San Jose, California. It saw an initial election held on June 5, 1990, followed by a runoff election on November 3, 1990, after no candidate managed to obtain a majority in the initial election. The runoff was won by Susan Hammer.

Incumbent mayor Tom McEnery was term limited.

== Candidates ==
Advanced to runoff

- Frank Fiscalini, former CEO of Alexian Brothers Hospital and former superintendent of the East Side Union High School District
- Susan Hammer, San Jose city councilor

Eliminated in first round

- William Chew
- Louis Garza
- Don Houston, realtor
- Shirley Lewis, San Jose city councilor
- Chris P. Panopulos, founder of the City of San Jose Fund

== Results ==
=== General election ===
1990 San Jose mayoral general election
Party	Candidate	Votes	%
Nonpartisan	Frank Fiscalini	39,833	33.05
Democratic	Susan W. Hammer	34,822	28.89
Nonpartisan	Shirley Lewis	29,049	24.10
Nonpartisan	Don Houston	9,444	7.84
Nonpartisan	Chris P. Panopulos	4,257	3.53
Nonpartisan	Louis Garza	1,869	1.55
Nonpartisan	William Chew	1,260	1.05
Total votes		120,534	100.00

=== Runoff ===
1990 San Jose mayoral runoff election
Party	Candidate	Votes	%
Democratic	Susan W. Hammer	89,399	50.39
Nonpartisan	Frank Fiscalini	88,016	49.61
Total votes		177,415	100.00
