= Bob Gallagher (baseball) =

American baseball player (1948–2024)

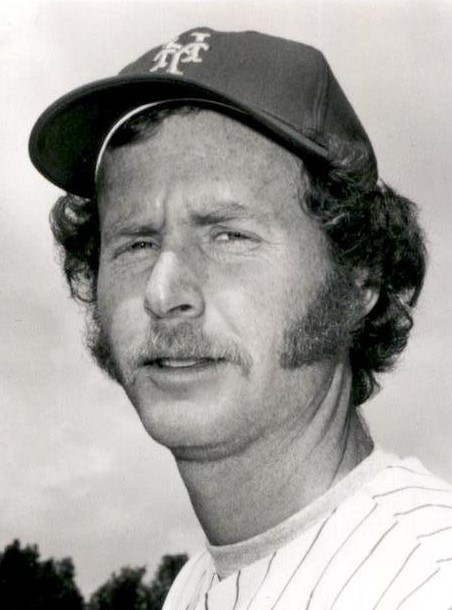
- Outfielder
- Born: July 7, 1948; Newton, Massachusetts, U.S.
- Died: August 14, 2024 (aged 76); Santa Cruz, California, U.S.
- Batted: Left Threw: Left

MLB debut
- May 17, 1972, for the Boston Red Sox

Last MLB appearance
- September 26, 1975, for the New York Mets

MLB statistics
- Batting average: .220
- Home runs: 2
- Runs batted in: 13
- Stats at Baseball Reference

Teams
- Boston Red Sox (1972); Houston Astros (1973–1974); New York Mets (1975)

Robert Collins Gallagher (July 7, 1948 – August 14, 2024) was an American outfielder in Major League Baseball who played from 1972 through 1975 for the Boston Red Sox (1972), Houston Astros (1973–74) and New York Mets (1975). Listed at 6' 3", 185 lb., he batted and threw left-handed. His grandfather, Shano Collins, was a Major League outfielder/manager and a player in the 1917 and 1919 World Series.

Gallagher attended Bellarmine College Preparatory before attending Stanford University and being selected by the Los Angeles Dodgers in the 17th round of the 1968 June Amateur Baseball draft.

In a four-season career, Gallagher was a .220 hitter (56-for-255) with two home runs and 13 runs batted in in 213 games played, including 34 runs, one triple, and one stolen base.

He taught high school social studies for 25 years at Santa Cruz High School in Santa Cruz, California. In 2010, he retired from teaching and worked as a substitute teacher for Santa Cruz High School.

He died on August 14, 2024, in Santa Cruz.
