= Copeland Bryan =

American football player (born 1983)

No. 94, 96
- Position: Defensive end

Personal information
- Born: July 14, 1983 (age 43); San Jose, California, U.S.
- Listed height: 6 ft 4 in (1.93 m)
- Listed weight: 253 lb (115 kg)

Career information
- High school: Bellarmine College Preparatory (San Jose)
- College: Arizona
- NFL draft: 2006: undrafted

Career history
- Tennessee Titans (2006)*; Chicago Bears (2006–2007)*; Buffalo Bills (2007–2008); Detroit Lions (2009–2010); Las Vegas Locomotives (2011); Montreal Alouettes (2012–2013)
- * Offseason or practice squad member only

Awards and highlights
- Second-team All-Pac-10 (2005)

Career NFL statistics
- Total tackles: 21
- Sacks: 2
- Fumble recoveries: 1
- Stats at Pro Football Reference

Copeland Bryan (born July 14, 1983) is an American former professional football player who was a defensive end in the National Football League (NFL). Bryan signed with the Tennessee Titans as an undrafted free agent in 2006, and played in games for the NFL's Buffalo Bills and Detroit Lions. He ended his playing career with the Las Vegas Locomotives and Montreal Alouettes.

Bryan played college football for the Arizona Wildcats. He is the older brother of NFL safety Courtney Bryan, and cousin of NFL players Donny Brady and Gary Brown.

== Early life ==
Copeland Jameel Bryan was born July 14, 1983, in San Jose, California, the son of Copeland Bryan and Viera Whye. Bryan attended Bellarmine College Preparatory School where he lettered in football and track.

== College ==
Bryan attended the University of Arizona where he walked-on the football team in 2001. After redshirting his freshman year, he placed second in sacks and in tackles for loss in 2002 and was given a scholarship. Bryan eventually played in 43 games with 22 starts from 2002 to 2005. He finished his college career with 109 tackles, 14 sacks, 21 TFLs, 11 PBUs, blocked 1 kick, forced 2 fumbles and had 2 fumble recoveries. Bryan earned Second-team All-Pac-10 honor in 2005.

== Professional career ==
Bryan entered the NFL as an undrafted free agent and signed with the Tennessee Titans on May 4, 2006. He was waived by the Titans in September 2006 and was signed immediately by the Chicago Bears practice squad. Bryan did not enter any games for the Chicago Bears which played in Super Bowl XLI. Bryan was waived by the Bears the following preseason. He signed with the Buffalo Bills in September 2007 and made his NFL debut against the New York Jets on October 28, 2007. He played 2 games for them in 2007 and 15 games in 2008. He then signed a three-year contract with the Detroit Lions, playing 5 games in 2009 before being placed on injured reserve with a sprained knee. Bryan later played for the Las Vegas Locomotives in 2011 and signed a two-year contract to play for the Montreal Alouettes in 2012.
