= Jim Wahler =

American football player (born 1966)

No. 66, 77
- Position: Defensive tackle

Personal information
- Born: July 29, 1966 (age 60); San Jose, California, U.S.
- Listed height: 6 ft 4 in (1.93 m)
- Listed weight: 259 lb (117 kg)

Career information
- High school: Bellarmine Prep (San Jose)
- College: UCLA
- NFL draft: 1989: 4th round, 94th overall pick

Career history
- Phoenix Cardinals (1989–1992); Washington Redskins (1992–1993); San Francisco 49ers (1995)*
- * Offseason or practice squad member only

Awards and highlights
- 2× Second-team All-Pac-10 (1987, 1988)

Career NFL statistics
- Sacks: 4.5
- Interceptions: 1
- Fumble recoveries: 1
- Stats at Pro Football Reference

James Joseph Wahler (born July 29, 1966) is an American former professional football player who was a defensive tackle in the National Football League (NFL) for the Phoenix Cardinals and the Washington Redskins. He played college football for the UCLA Bruins and was selected in the fourth round of the 1989 NFL draft with the 94th overall pick.

Pre-draft measurables
Height	Weight	40-yard dash	10-yard split	20-yard split	20-yard shuttle	Vertical jump
6 ft 4 1/8 in (1.93 m)	266 lb (121 kg)	4.99 s	1.73 s	2.94 s	4.78 s	31.0 in (0.79 m)
All values from NFL Combine
