= The Seven Five =

- Theatrical film poster
- Directed by: Tiller Russell
- Produced by: Eli Holzman; Aaron Saidman; Sheldon Yellen
- Edited by: James Carroll
- Production companies: All3Media America; Belfor Entertainment; Waltz International Pictures
- Distributed by: Entertainment One
- Release date: November 14, 2014
- Running time: 104 minutes
- Country: United States
- Language: English

The Seven Five, also known as Seven Five Precinct, is a 2014 documentary directed by Tiller Russell, and produced by Eli Holzman, Aaron Saidman, and Sheldon Yellen. The film looks at police corruption in the 75th Precinct of the New York Police Department during the 1980s. The documentary focuses on Michael Dowd and Kenneth Eurell, both corrupt New York City police officers, who were arrested in 1992, leading to one of the largest police corruption scandals in New York City history. The documentary uses footage from the Mollen Commission investigation in 1992 and also provides in-depth commentary from Dowd, Ken Eurell, and Adam Diaz, among others. The documentary premiered at DOC NYC November 14, 2014.

== Plot ==
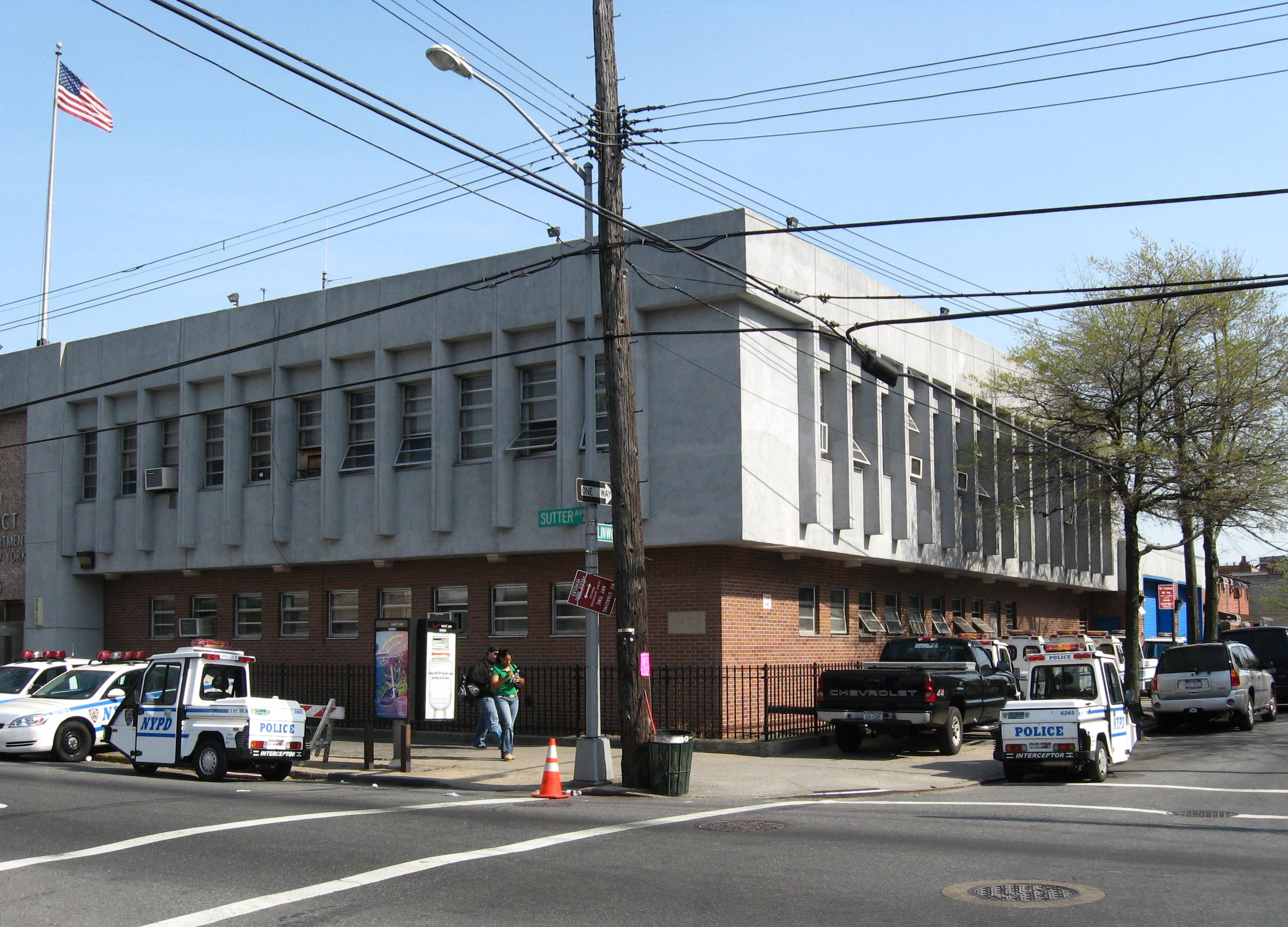
The 75th Precinct today, located on Sutter Ave., East New York, Brooklyn.

In the 1980s, Brooklyn, New York was suffering from a crack epidemic. Michael Dowd worked in the NYPD's 75th Precinct in the East New York neighborhood of Brooklyn, which was considered to be one of the most dangerous precincts in the United States at the time. The 75th Precinct had one of the highest murder rates in the country during the late 1980s. Dowd describes being under-appreciated for the amount of work he put in and hurting for money as the reasons for taking money from drug dealers. He initially began taking bribes from drug dealers on the streets before moving on to protecting a drug cartel leader and robbing other drug dealers at gunpoint. Dowd and his then-partner Henry "Chicky" Guevara recount the first time walking into a domestic dispute in an apartment and seeing bags of marijuana, a duffle bag filled with approximately $20,000 in cash and two guns. Dowd communicated that he and his partner would take $8000 from the duffle bag and both guns. Dowd continued to rob drug dealers for thousands of dollars. Guevara resigned shortly after multiple police officers were arrested in the 77th Precinct for corruption related offenses.

Ken Eurell, a police officer at the 75th Precinct, was then assigned as Dowd's new partner in June 1987. Eurell had a drinking problem and frequently drank on the job. Dowd and Eurell met a Dominican gang leader named Adam Diaz. Diaz ran The Diaz Organization, a gang that was responsible for countless murders and drug trafficking throughout New York City. He used several supermarkets in East New York as fronts to traffic drugs, mainly cocaine. Dowd and Eurell began a working relationship with Diaz, where they provided protection and inside information about raids.

After a prolonged investigation, the Suffolk County Police Department arrested Dowd and Eurell on drug trafficking charges (in addition to their work for Diaz in the city, the men had begun distributing cocaine through a friend who lived in the county). Dowd and Eurell were released on bail. While out on bail, Dowd was approached by a friend in a Colombian gang who wanted a woman kidnapped over an unpaid drug debt. Dowd's plan was to hand the woman over to the gang and for him and Eurell to take the hundreds of thousands of dollars at the woman's house and flee the United States. Eurell agreed to Dowd's kidnapping scheme but instead of following through with the scheme contacted Internal Affairs through his lawyer. Shortly after, in July 1991, Dowd was arrested and sent to trial. He was the main focus of the 1992 Mollen Commission that investigated police corruption in the NYPD. In the wake of Dowd's arrest, Mayor David Dinkins appointed the Mollen Commission to investigate police corruption within the NYPD. As a result, dozens of officers across the city's precincts were arrested.

== Convictions ==
Dowd was convicted of racketeering and conspiracy to distribute narcotics and was sentenced to 14 years in prison in 1994, serving 13 years. Prior to trial, Dowd agreed to testify before the Commission but he refused to implicate any NYPD officers other than himself. Eurell did not serve any time due to his cooperation with the investigation. Adam Diaz, after serving eight years in prison, was deported to the Dominican Republic.

== Reception ==
The film was well received and has an 83% rating on Rotten Tomatoes with 24 out of 29 reviews being positive.

== Film adaptation ==
On March 13, 2015, Sony Pictures purchased the rights of The Seven Five documentary with Yann Demange set to direct and Scott Frank writing the script. On January 25, 2018, Craig Gillespie was hired to direct instead of Demange. On December 16, 2020, Metro-Goldwyn-Mayer took over the film adaptation documentary with Ben Stiller set to direct from a Tony McNamara script and Aaron Taylor-Johnson in talks to portray Dowd.
