= Mercor =

American technology company

Mercor.io Corporation
- Trade name: Mercor
- Type: Private
- Industry: Artificial intelligence
- Founded: 2023; 3 years ago
- Founders: Brendan Foody; Adarsh Hiremath; Surya Midha
- Headquarters: 181 Fremont, San Francisco, California, United States
- Key people: Brendan Foody (CEO); Surya Midha (chairman); Sundeep Jain (president); Adarsh Hiremath (CTO)
- Number of employees: 400 (2026)
- Website: mercor.com

Mercor.io Corporation (Mercor) is an American artificial intelligence (AI) data startup that provides experts to train AI models and chatbots. Founded in 2023, the company is headquartered in 181 Fremont, San Francisco.

== History ==
Mercor was founded in 2023 by Brendan Foody, Adarsh Hiremath, and Surya Midha, three Bay Area high school friends who competed together on the Bellarmine College Preparatory Speech and Debate Team. The three dropped out of college to focus on Mercor, and were later awarded Thiel Fellowships. The company was originally formed to connect freelance programmers in India with companies in the United States, and they developed an AI platform to interview programmers and match them with hiring companies. The company shifted focus to data labeling, matching expert contractors with AI companies like OpenAI looking for help to train their algorithms.

The company's three founders became the youngest self-made billionaires in 2025 after starting the company in 2023 at the age of 22.

In May 2025, the company hired Uber's former chief product officer Sundeep Jain as its first president.

In October 2025, the company raised a $350 million Series C at a $10 billion valuation, making the three then 22-year old founders the youngest self-made billionaires.

In January 2026, the company released its first APEX-Agents AI benchmarking report, to show how successfully the leading AI models performed business tasks.

In late March 2026, Mercor was reportedly impacted by a supply-chain attack involving the LiteLLM package, which potentially exposed up to 4 terabytes of internal data and contractor personally identifiable information. The breach led to multiple class-action lawsuits and a temporary pause in work from major clients, including Meta, as the company conducted forensic investigations into the exposure of proprietary training protocols.

In July 2026, Mercor acquired AI simulation startup Deeptune.

== Business ==
Foody is the CEO, Hiremath CTO, and Midha board chairman.

Mercor recruits experts including engineers, lawyers, doctors, bankers and journalists to train AI models and chatbots. Its customers include OpenAI and Anthropic. According to the company, it manages 30,000 contractors as of October 2025. Contractors interviewed by The Verge, New York Magazine, and Wired said they faced a stressful work environment, poor management, and declining pay.

The company also produces an AI research benchmark called APEX-Agents, which studies how effectively different AI models perform tasks in business areas including consulting, investment banking, and law.
