= Ron Gonzales =

American politician (born 1951)

Ronald R. Gonzales
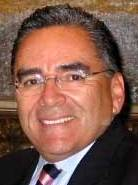

63rd Mayor of San Jose
- In office January 1, 1999 – January 9, 2007
- Preceded by: Susan Hammer
- Succeeded by: Chuck Reed

Santa Clara County Supervisor
- In office 1989–1996
- Preceded by: Tom Legan
- Succeeded by: Peter McHugh

Personal details
- Born: 1951 (age 74–75) San Francisco, California, U.S.
- Party: Democratic
- Education: University of California, Santa Cruz (BA)
- Profession: Politician

Ronald R. Gonzales (born 1951) is an American politician who served as the 63rd Mayor of San Jose, California (1999–2007). A member of the Democratic Party, Gonzales was the first Hispanic to serve as Mayor of San Jose since 1845.

== Early life ==
Gonzales grew up in the Santa Clara Valley, and graduated from the University of California, Santa Cruz.

== Early political career ==
At age 18, Ron Gonzales won a seat on the student council at De Anza College.

Gonzales became active in municipal politics in the late 1970s, heading a citizens’ commission in Sunnyvale that recommended maintaining low density zoning in Sunnyvale neighborhoods. He first ran for Sunnyvale City Council in 1977 and lost by 300 votes.

After being elected to Sunnyvale City Council on his second attempt in 1979, Gonzales was quoted in a national column saying that a proposed censure of ex-Sunnyvale mayor Larry Stone for posing in a photo with Fidel Castro “was the most ridiculous matter to come to council” during his tenure.

Gonzales succeeded Stone as mayor in 1980, and served again as mayor in 1987-88.

He completed the Mayor's Leadership Program at Harvard Kennedy School and is an American Leadership Forum fellow.

== Santa Clara County Supervisor ==
In 1988, Gonzales ran for county supervisor and received 49.7 percent of the votes in the June primary. Incumbent Supervisor Tom Legan, who was on trial for but not convicted of molesting his underaged stepdaughter, polled 10.3% and Milpitas Mayor Robert Livengood made the runoff with 40%.

Gonzales won the runoff with 57.4% of the November general election vote, becoming the county’s first elected Mexican-American county supervisor.

He then served for eight years (1989–1996) on the Santa Clara County Board of Supervisors.

== Mayor of San Jose ==
In 1998, Gonzales was elected mayor of San Jose, edging out councilperson Pat Dando with 51.4% of the vote. He began his term in 1999.

Early in his first term, Gonzales began new programs. He designed a program to attract young teachers to the city's schools, including home purchase assistance programs. He advocated using San Jose Redevelopment Agency funds in areas outside downtown, including the King and Story neighborhood.

Gonzales pushed for BART to extend to Downtown San Jose, in the Silicon Valley BART extension. When San Jose's first BART station, Berryessa/North San José station, opened, many officials credited Gonzales with bringing this project to fruition.

== Latino political revolution ==
Ron Gonzales was the first Latino Mayor of San Jose since California's statehood. As San Jose is a major metropolitan region, that made Gonzales one of the first Hispanic mayors of a major U.S. city. He is listed among the nation's "Most influential Hispanics". When he addressed the 2000 Democratic National Convention in Los Angeles, Mayor Gonzales launched into an impassioned speech extolling the virtues of California's famed "Silicon Valley."

Gonzales came under frequent political attacks during the transitional years as San Jose politics moved left. As a single prominent Latino politician, he formed an easy target for dog whistle attacks tuned for a white voting constituency.

In 2000, a political spectacle was made out of Gonzales' personal life, which culminated in the politicized news of a separation from his wife and a relationship with a staffer, Guiselle Nunez, whom he married.

With his marriage already a public spectacle, in 2003, Gonzales came under political attack for negotiating a raise for sanitation workers. The issue revolved around a nine-percent, $11 million ($2000), increase for Norcal Waste Systems, Inc., that Gonzales advocated the San Jose City Council adopt. Which the Council did. Gonzalez's political distractors framed the negotiation through a Santa Clara County Civil Grand Jury as an illegal quid pro quo to the Teamsters workers, which were part of Gonzales' labor political base. In a dramatic turn, fellow councilman Dave Cortese demanded Gonzales's resignation while member Chuck Reed began proceedings to remove Gonzales from his office as mayor. Eventually, the Council voted to censure Gonzales, but took no further actions. When the issue came before a judge, all charges were thrown out, on the basis that the prosecution's claims were novel as a matter of law, and even if true, did not amount to illegal activity. In the court's opinion, the judge wrote "This is not bribery, this is politics."

In 2002, Gonzales created the Silicon Valley Leadership PAC and started collecting donations for this fund. With the above noted sanitation political fight ongoing and suffering a stroke in January, in March 2004, Gonzales announced he would stop collecting donations because of controversy about the fund. He is also the founder of the Hispanic Foundation of Silicon Valley.

== Late political career ==
Gonzales was reelected as mayor in the March 2002 election. His second, and final, term as San Jose mayor ended in 2006. On January 28, 2004, while delivering the State of the City address, Gonzales suffered a stroke. He returned to his duties on February 16 of that year. Gonzales stayed out of the race to succeed him and did not endorse or campaign for either candidate running in the November 2006 run-off election. The winner was Chuck Reed, who won a clear majority of the votes over the vice-Mayor of San Jose, Cindy Chavez.

== Career ==
After leaving the Santa Clara County Board of Supervisors due to term limits, Gonzales was an executive at Hewlett-Packard. Gonzales worked as Program Manager for ten years at Hewlett-Packard where he led a national initiative to create partnerships with local school districts and universities.

== Honors ==
Gonzales received the Community Impact Award in June 1999 from the Asian Law Alliance, as well as the Point of Light Award, a national honor given to individuals who have made significant contributions to their community. Gonzales founded of The Role Model Program, an effort that recruits adult role models to visit local middle schools . He also chairs the National League of Cities Youth, Education, and Families Council overseeing the League's policies related to the betterment of youth and families across the country , and was a founding board member of Downtown College Prep, Santa Clara County's first charter high school, which focuses on the academic success of high school students from the San Jose central city area.
