= Sal Cesario =

American football player (born 1963)

No. 79
- Position: Guard

Personal information
- Born: July 4, 1963 (age 63); Stockton, California, U.S.
- Listed height: 6 ft 4 in (1.93 m)
- Listed weight: 255 lb (116 kg)

Career information
- High school: Bellarmine Preparatory (CA)
- College: Cal Poly
- NFL draft: 1986: 12th round, 328th overall pick

Career history
- New York Jets (1986)*; Dallas Cowboys (1987); Miami Dolphins (1988)*
- * Offseason or practice squad member only

Awards and highlights
- All-American (1985); 3× All-WFC (1983-1985)

Career NFL statistics
- Games played: 3
- Games started: 3
- Stats at Pro Football Reference

Salvatore J. Cesario (born July 4, 1963) is an American former professional football player who was an offensive guard for the Dallas Cowboys of the National Football League (NFL). He played college football for the Cal Poly Mustangs.

== Early life ==
Cesario attended Bellarmine College Preparatory, where he played as a tight end/fullback. He also played basketball.

He walked-on at Division II Cal Poly San Luis Obispo. As a freshman, he was awarded a football scholarship two weeks after beginning to practice with the team as a defensive end but would quickly convert to play H-back his freshman season.

As a sophomore, he was converted into an offensive tackle. He became a three-year starter at left tackle.

== Professional career ==
=== New York Jets ===
Cesario was selected by the New York Jets in the twelfth round (328th overall) of the 1986 NFL draft. He was waived on September 1, after struggling because he lacked size. On February 19, 1987, he was signed to participate in training camp. He was released on August 31.

=== Dallas Cowboys ===
After the NFLPA strike was declared on the third week of the 1987 season, those contests were canceled (reducing the 16-game season to 15) and the NFL decided that the games would be played with replacement players. In September, he was signed to be a part of the Dallas Cowboys replacement team that was given the mock name "Rhinestone Cowboys" by the media. He started 3 games at left guard. He was cut on October 20, at the end of the strike.

=== Miami Dolphins ===
On March 23, 1988, he was signed as a free agent by the Miami Dolphins. He was released on August 23.

== Personal life ==
After football, he became the Global Sales and Marketing Manager at Micro-Pak Ltd. His father Sal Sr. was selected by the Detroit Lions in the 1959 NFL draft.
