= Janet Gray Hayes =

American mayor (1926–2014)

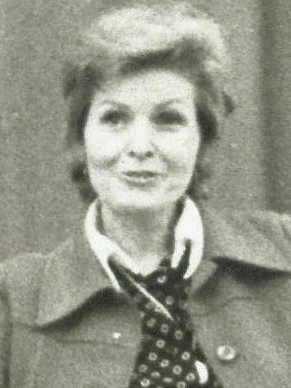

60th Mayor of San Jose, California
- In office January 9, 1975 – January 9, 1983
- Preceded by: Norman Mineta
- Succeeded by: Tom McEnery

Vice Mayor of San Jose
- In office 1973–1974

San Jose City Councilor
- In office 1971–1974

Personal details
- Born: July 12, 1926 Rushville, Indiana, U.S.
- Died: April 21, 2014 (aged 87) Saratoga, California, U.S.
- Party: Democratic
- Education: Indiana University Bloomington
- Alma mater: Crown Family School of Social Work, Policy, and Practice

Janet Gray Hayes (July 12, 1926 – April 21, 2014) was the 60th mayor of San Jose, California, elected to two consecutive, four-year terms from 1975 to 1983. She was both the first woman to be elected mayor San Jose, and the first woman elected mayor of a major U.S. city with a population of more than 500,000 people.

== Early life and education ==
Janet Gray Frazee was born in Rushville, Indiana and graduated from Rushville High School in 1944. She then went to University of Chicago and received her bachelor's degree from Indiana University Bloomington. In 1956, Hayes and her husband moved to San Jose, California where her husband practiced medicine.

== Political career ==
Hayes was elected to the San Jose City Council in 1971 after the city had rebuffed her request for a traffic signal near her children's elementary school. In 1973, she was voted by the city council to serve as the city's vice mayor, becoming the first woman to hold that position. In 1974, she was elected mayor of the city. She was reelected in 1978. She was a Democrat and campaigned as an environmentalist. She positioned herself as an opponent of urban sprawl in San Jose.

== Death and legacy ==
She died of a stroke on April 26, 2014, in Saratoga, California. On November 19, 2024, the rotunda of San Jose City Hall was rededicated as the Janet Gray Hayes Rotunda in her honor.
