= 1994 San Jose mayoral election =

- June 7, 1994
- Turnout: 29.71%
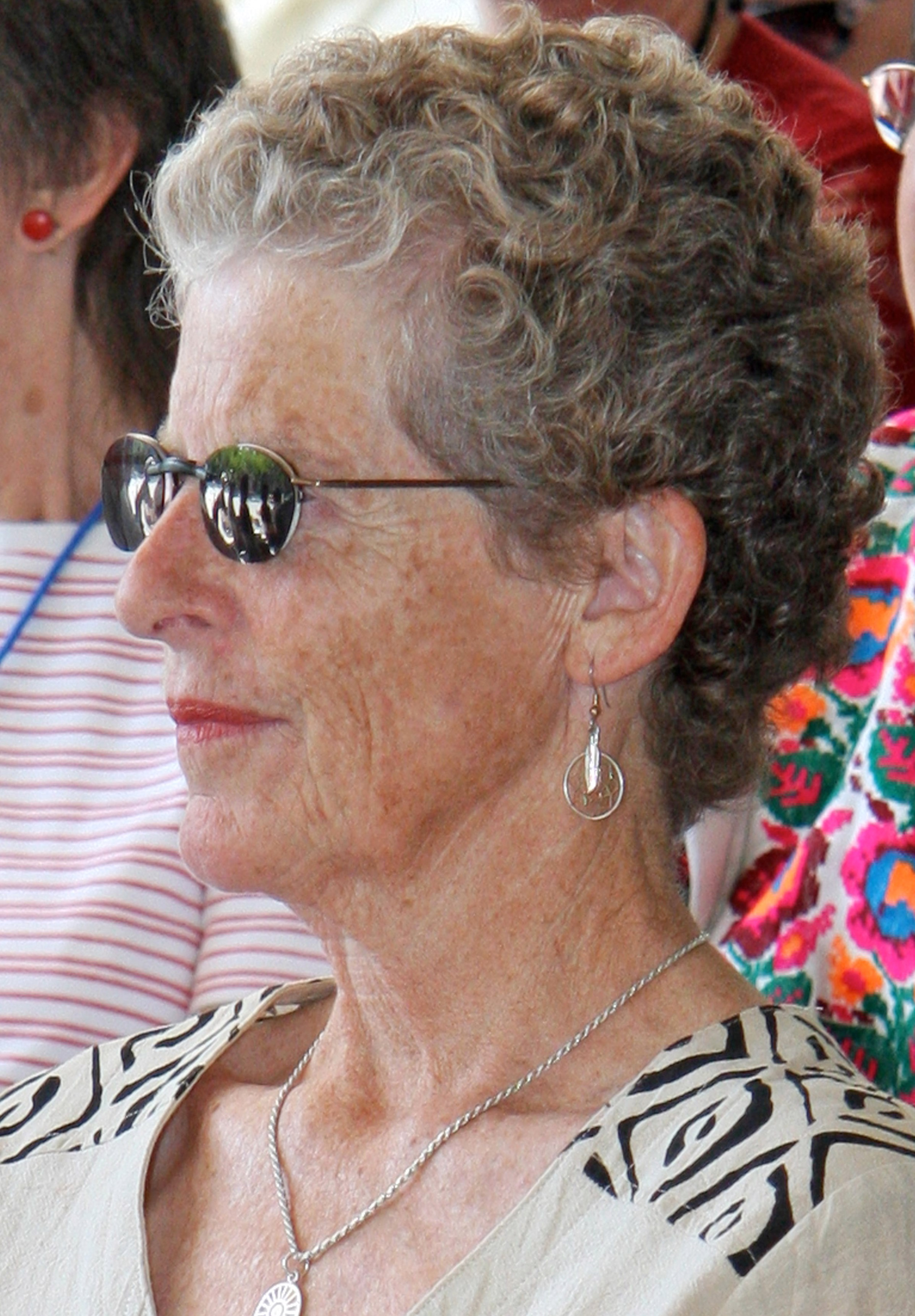

Candidate	Susan Hammer	Kathy Chavez Napoli
Party	Democratic	Nonpartisan
Popular vote	57,725	27,598
Percentage	57.79%	27.63%
Candidate	Andrew G. Diaz	Bill Chew
Party	Nonpartisan	Nonpartisan
Popular vote	8,082	6,484
Percentage	8.09%	6.49%
Mayor before election
Susan Hammer
Democratic
Elected mayor
Susan Hammer
Democratic

The 1994 San Jose mayoral election was held on June 7, 1994, to elect the mayor of San Jose, California. It saw the reelection of Susan Hammer. Because Hammer won an outright majority in the initial round of the election, no runoff election needed to be held.

== Results ==
Results
Party	Candidate	Votes	%
Democratic	Susan Hammer (incumbent)	57,725	57.79
Nonpartisan	Kathy Chavez Napoli	27,598	27.63
Nonpartisan	Andrew G. Diaz	8,082	8.09
Nonpartisan	Bill Chew	6,484	6.49
Total votes		99,889	100.00
Turnout		107,405	29.71
