= Randy Kirk =

American football player (born 1964)

No. 94, 52, 57, 54, 55, 58
- Position: Linebacker

Personal information
- Born: December 27, 1964 (age 61); San Jose, California, U.S.
- Listed height: 6 ft 1 in (1.85 m)
- Listed weight: 232 lb (105 kg)

Career information
- High school: Bellarmine (San Jose)
- College: San Diego State
- NFL draft: 1987: undrafted

Career history
- New York Giants (1987)*; San Diego Chargers (1987–1988); Phoenix Cardinals (1989); Washington Redskins (1990); Cleveland Browns (1991); San Diego Chargers (1991); Cincinnati Bengals (1992–1993); Arizona Cardinals (1994–1995); San Francisco 49ers (1996–1999)
- * Offseason or practice squad member only

Career NFL statistics
- Tackles: 24
- Fumble recoveries: 4
- Sacks: 1
- Stats at Pro Football Reference

Randall Scott Kirk (born December 27, 1964) is an American former professional football player who was a linebacker and special teams member for 13 seasons in the National Football League (NFL). He played high school football at Bellarmine College Preparatory and college football for the San Diego State Aztecs. He began playing for the San Diego Chargers in 1987, and played for several teams from 1987 to 1999.
