= Ed Giovanola =

American baseball player (born 1969)

- Infielder
- Born: March 4, 1969 (age 57); Los Gatos, California, U.S.
- Batted: Left Threw: Right

MLB debut
- September 10, 1995, for the Atlanta Braves

Last MLB appearance
- August 25, 1999, for the San Diego Padres

MLB statistics
- Batting average: .216
- Home runs: 1
- Runs batted in: 19
- Stats at Baseball Reference

Teams
- Atlanta Braves (1995–1997); San Diego Padres (1998–1999)

Edward Thomas Giovanola (born March 4, 1969) is an American former Major League Baseball infielder. He is an alumnus of Bellarmine College Preparatory and Santa Clara University.

Drafted by the Atlanta Braves in the 7th round of the 1990 MLB amateur draft, Giovanola spent several years with Atlanta's Double-A minor league affiliate, the Greenville Braves, before becoming a standout player with the Triple-A Richmond Braves, culminating in his Major League Baseball debut with the Atlanta Braves on September 10, 1995. After three years in Atlanta, Giovanola spent the following two years with the San Diego Padres, for whom he appeared in his final Major League game on August 25, 1999.
