= Frank Bergon =

American writer (born 1943)

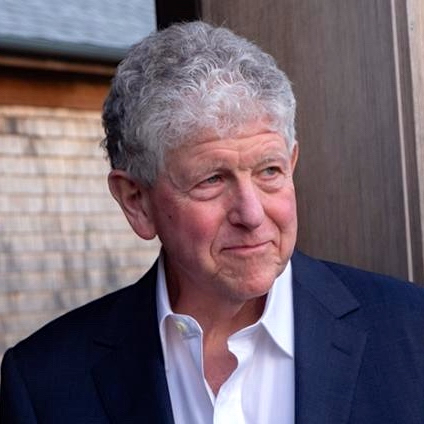
- Bergon in West Tisbury, Massachusetts, 2019
- Born: 1943 (age 82–83); Ely, Nevada, U.S.
- Education: Bellarmine College Preparatory; Boston College (BA); Stanford University; Harvard University (PhD)
- Occupation: Writer
- Spouse: Holly St. John Bergon

Frank Bergon (born 1943) is an American writer whose novels, essays, anthologies, and literary criticism focus primarily on the American West.

== Biography ==
Frank Bergon was born in Ely, Nevada, and grew up on a ranch in Madera County in California's San Joaquin Valley. After attending elementary school at St. Joachim in Madera, California and high school at Bellarmine College Preparatory in San Jose, he received a B.A. in English at Boston College, attended Stanford University as a Wallace Stegner Fellow, and completed a Ph.D. in English and American Literature at Harvard University.

== Writing career ==
Bergon has published twelve books—four novels, a critical study of Stephen Crane, five edited collections and anthologies, and most recently two books of essays. A major concern of his work is with the lives of Basque Americans in the West. His writing about Native Americans ranges from the Shoshone of Nevada to the Maya of Chiapas, Mexico.

His Nevada trilogy consists of three novels spanning a century from the Shoshone massacre of 1911 (Shoshone Mike), to the shooting of Fish and Game officers by the self-styled mountain man Claude Dallas (Wild Game), to the current battle over nuclear waste in the Nevada desert (The Temptations of St. Ed & Brother S).

Bergon's California trilogy, consisting of, Jesse's Ghost, Two-Buck Chuck & The Marlboro Man: The New Old West and The Toughest Kid We Knew: The Old New West: A Personal History, all focus on the San Joaquin Valley, and his Basque-Béarnais heritage. His writing was the subject of a 2019 conference and 2020 book by scholars and writers from the U.S. and the Basque Country: Visions of a Basque American Western: International Perspectives on the Writings of Frank Bergon. The trilogy also draws attention to today's sons and daughters of the California Okies portrayed in Steinbeck's The Grapes of Wrath. Jesse's Ghost was selected in 2024 for The New York Times "Best Books About California."

He also writes about the natural history and environment of the American West in both fiction and non-fiction, such as in The Journals of Lewis and Clark.

With his wife, Holly St. John Bergon, he has published translations of the Spanish poets Antonio Gamaneda, José Ovejero, Xavier Queipo, and Violeta C. Rangel in New European Poets and The European Constitution in Verse.

Bergon has taught at the University of Washington and for many years at Vassar College, where he is professor emeritus of English. In 1998, Bergon was inducted into the Nevada Writers Hall of Fame. In 2024, he was included into the Bellarmine Hall of Fame.

== Books ==
- The Toughest Kid We Knew: The Old New West: A Personal History (2020)
- Two-Buck Chuck & The Marlboro Man: The New Old West (2019)
- Jesse's Ghost (2011)
- Wild Game (1995)
- The Temptations of St. Ed & Brother S (1993)
- The Journals of Lewis and Clark, editor (1989)
- Shoshone Mike (1987)
- A Sharp Lookout: Selected Nature Essays of John Burroughs, editor (1987)
- The Wilderness Reader, editor (1980)
- The Western Writings of Stephen Crane, editor (1979)
- Looking Far West: The Search for the American West in History, Myth, and Literature, coeditor with Zeese Papanikolas (1978)
- Stephen Crane's Artistry (1975)

== Essays and Articles ==
Guns and Grammar, or How to Read the Second Amendment published in The Los Angeles Review of Books humorously but devastatingly makes that case that an incorrect textual reading of the Second Amendment by Supreme Court Justice Antonin Scalia starts, and continues to cause, disastrous rulings on U.S. gun laws.

I Understand Thee, and Can Speak Thy Tongue: California Unlocks Shakespeare's Gibberish published in the Los Angeles Review of Books links what has been regarded as gibberish in Shakespeare to the Basque language.
