= Michael Clay =

American football player and coach (born 1991)

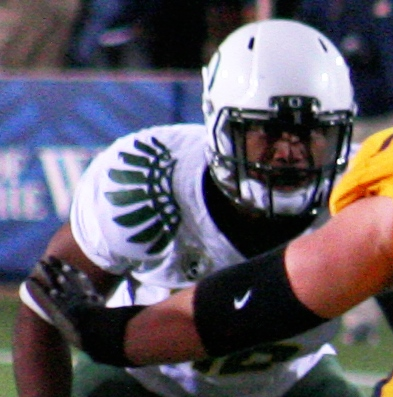
- Clay with Oregon in 2010

Philadelphia Eagles
- Title: Special teams coordinator

Personal information
- Born: August 30, 1991 (age 35); Santa Clara, California, U.S.
- Listed height: 5 ft 11 in (1.80 m)
- Listed weight: 230 lb (104 kg)

Career information
- Position: Linebacker
- High school: San Jose (CA) Bellarmine College Prep
- College: Oregon
- NFL draft: 2013: undrafted

Career history

Playing
- Miami Dolphins (2013)*
- * Offseason or practice squad member only

Coaching
- Philadelphia Eagles (2014–2015); Defensive quality control coach (2014); Assistant special teams coach (2015); San Francisco 49ers (2016–2020); Assistant special teams coach (2016); Assistant strength and conditioning coach (2017); Assistant special teams coach (2018-2020); Philadelphia Eagles (2021–present) Special teams coordinator

Awards and highlights
- As coach: Super Bowl champion (LIX); As player: Second-team All-Pac-12 (2012)

Michael Vincent Clay (born August 30, 1991) is an American professional football coach who is the special teams coordinator for the Philadelphia Eagles of the National Football League (NFL). He played college football as a linebacker for the Oregon Ducks.

== Playing career ==
Pre-draft measurables
Height	Weight	Arm length	Hand span	Wingspan	40-yard dash	10-yard split	20-yard split	20-yard shuttle	Three-cone drill	Vertical jump	Broad jump	Bench press
5 ft 11 3/8 in (1.81 m)	230 lb (104 kg)	30 3/4 in (0.78 m)	8 3/4 in (0.22 m)	6 ft 1 7/8 in (1.88 m)	4.73 s	1.70 s	2.74 s	4.18 s	6.86 s	31.5 in (0.80 m)	9 ft 6 in (2.90 m)	23 reps
All values from Pro Day

On April 27, 2013, Clay signed with the Miami Dolphins as an undrafted free agent. He was released from the team during final roster cuts on August 27, 2013.

== Coaching career ==
On January 27, 2014, Clay was hired as defensive quality control coach for the Philadelphia Eagles under head coach Chip Kelly. He was promoted to assistant special teams coach on February 3, 2015.

On January 27, 2016, it was announced that he would be the assistant special teams coach of the San Francisco 49ers.

On January 29, 2021, Clay was hired as the special teams coordinator for the Philadelphia Eagles. On February 17, 2024, he signed a contract extension with the Eagles. Clay was part of the coaching staff that won Super Bowl LIX over the Kansas City Chiefs.
