= Leo Righetti =

American baseball player (1925–1998)

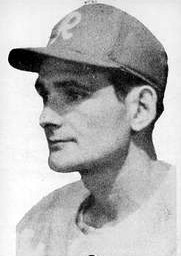
- Pitcher / Shortstop
- Born: March 4, 1925; San Francisco, California, U.S.
- Died: February 19, 1998 (aged 72); San Jose, California, U.S.
- Batted: Right Threw: Right
- Stats at Baseball Reference

Leo Charles Righetti (March 4, 1925 – February 19, 1998) was an American professional baseball player. He played in minor league baseball from 1944 through 1957. His son, Dave Righetti, played in Major League Baseball.

== Early life ==
Righetti grew up in San Jose, California. His father, Marco, immigrated to the United States from Italy.

Righetti drew notice in his amateur baseball career, as he started in baseball by playing sandlot ball. He played his first organized baseball with the local Catholic Youth Organization, and then played for the baseball team at Bellarmine College Preparatory.

== Professional career ==
Righetti drew interest from Joe Devine, a scout for the New York Yankees. He was an excellent fielding shortstop, though not a skilled batter. However, it was thought that his skill as a pitcher could lead him to a career in Major League Baseball. Righetti signed a $10,000 contract with the Yankees in 1944. The Yankees assigned him to the Newark Bears of the International League.

In 1946, he slipped and fell, cutting his right index finger in the process, which ended his pitching career. He remained in the Yankees organization as a shortstop until 1950, when he quit his team. Righetti worked out for the Milwaukee Braves in spring training of 1952, but did not make the team. When the Braves informed Righetti that they wanted to send him to Class AAA, Righetti became angry, and launched a chair at a Braves team official, costing himself a chance of playing for the Braves later in the season. (Note: Sources conflict on whether he kicked a chair at general manager Charles Quinn or threw a chair at manager Tommy Holmes.) The Braves released Righetti to return to play in the Pacific Coast League (PCL). He played in the PCL for six more seasons before he retired.

== Personal ==
After retiring from baseball, Righetti went to work for his father's tallow business in San Jose.

Righetti had two sons, whom he taught to play baseball. His older son, Steve, played in minor league baseball, while his younger son, Dave, reached Major League Baseball with the Yankees. Righetti died at the age of 72 on February 20, 1998.
