= Bellarmine College Preparatory =

Private secondary school in San Jose, California, United States

Location
- 960 West Hedding Street; San Jose, California 95126; United States; 37°20′32″N 121°55′07″W

Information
- Type: Private
- Motto: Men For and With Others
- Religious affiliation: Catholic (Jesuit)
- Patron saint: Saint Robert Bellarmine
- Established: 1851; 175 years ago
- Founder: Fr. John Nobili, SJ
- Sister school: Notre Dame High School, Presentation High School
- CEEB code: 053080
- President: Chris Meyercord
- Dean: Kevin Miller
- Principal: Rod Jemison
- Faculty: 145 lay, 20 Jesuits
- Grades: 9–12
- Enrollment: 1,655 (2021)
- Campus size: 27 acres (110,000 m^{2})
- Colors: Blue, light blue, white
- Athletics conference: WCAL (13 sports)
- Mascot: Bellarman the Bell
- Newspaper: The Bell Online bellonline.org
- Yearbook: The Carillon carillon.bcp.org
- Endowment: US$119 million (2021)
- Tuition: US$29,045 (2023–2024)
- Website: www.bcp.org
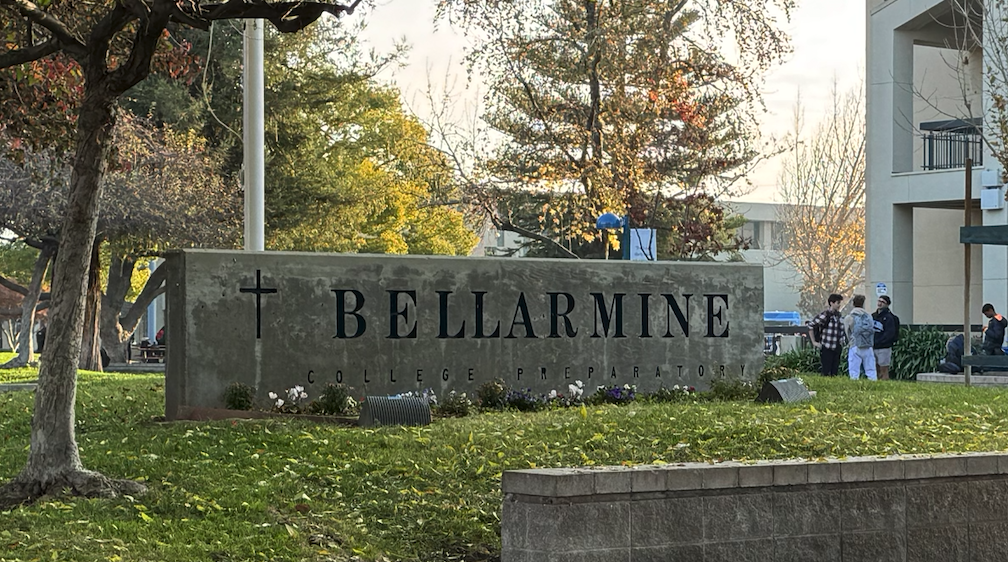
- Southern Entrance of Bellarmine College Preparatory

Bellarmine College Preparatory is an all-boys, Jesuit, private secondary school located in San Jose, California. Founded on May 8, 1851, as part of Santa Clara College, it is the oldest Jesuit secondary school in California and the second-oldest west of the Mississippi River.

== Overview ==
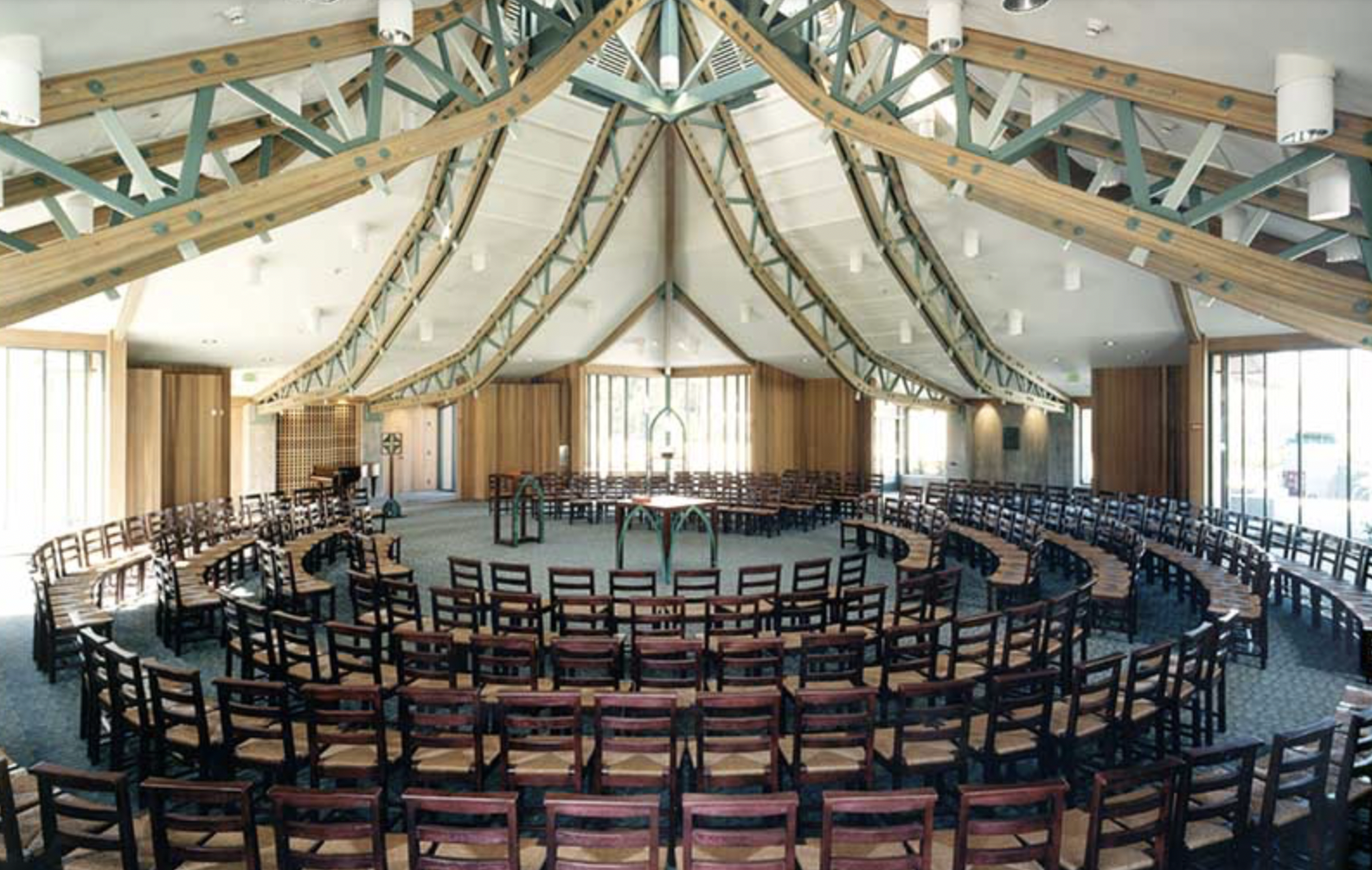
Interior of Leontyne Chapel

A Catholic school in the tradition of Saint Ignatius of Loyola, Bellarmine is a member of the West Catholic Athletic League, the Jesuit Schools Network, and the Western Association of Schools and Colleges.

As of 2021, Bellarmine led the CIF Central Coast Section with 140 Division 1 titles. Bellarmine's Speech and Debate Team was ranked in the top 10 programs in the country with its policy debate team ranked #1 after winning the triple crown (NDCA Championship, Tournament of Champions, and NDSA Nationals) in 2021. In 2025, Bellarmine Speech and Debate was ranked #1 in the US according to the NSDA. In addition, the school's FIRST Robotics Competition team, Team 254: The Cheesy Poofs, has been the World Champion 5 times (2011, 2014, 2017, 2018, 2022) . The school's publications include its student newspaper, The Bell Online, and its yearbook, The Carillon - named for the instrument consisting of multiple bells.

The school is reputed for its graduates’ contributions and powerful influence in the Bay Area. Bellarmine's list of notable alumni includes 4 Olympians (six Gold Medals combined), 5 living Billionaires, 3 Mayors of San Jose, the former team owners of the San Francisco Giants and Oakland Athletics, 3 World Series Champions, 5 Super Bowl Champions, 1 Academy-Award Winner, 1 Pulitzer Prize Winner, 28 Professional MLB athletes, numerous award-winning authors and several state politicians. Bellarmine alumni have won prestigious postgraduate scholarships including the Rhodes Scholarship, Marshall Scholarship, Schwarzman Scholarship, MacArthur Fellowship, and the Fulbright Awards.

== History ==
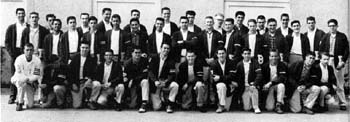
Bellarmine students in the Class of 1958

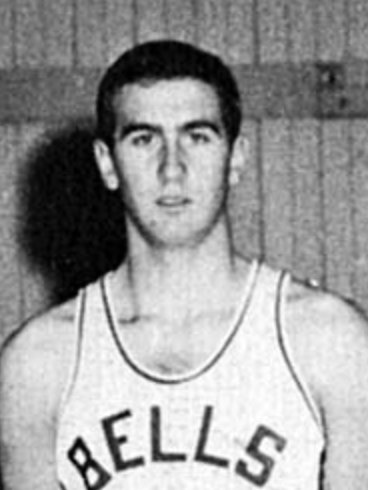
Tom McEnery '63 (61st Mayor of San Jose)

Bellarmine was founded in 1851 by Fr. John Nobili, S.J., and his companions, as Santa Clara College, a school for secondary and college-age students. In 1912, the college was separated into 2 schools - Santa Clara University and Santa Clara Prep. After sharing the same campus for thirteen years, the secondary school moved to its current College Park Campus after purchasing the land from the University of the Pacific (then known as the College of the Pacific) for $77,500. In 1926, the renovated school opened its doors to a student body of 200 registered students. In 1928, it was named Bellarmine College Preparatory in honor of St. Robert Bellarmine, a Jesuit scholar and Doctor of the Church.

In 2011, the Lorry I. Lokey Academic Center was completed after a $15 million gift from the family of the philanthropist and founder of Business Wire. This was the single largest gift in the school's history. The new center houses over 27 classrooms, a faculty lounge and the Craft-Malcolm Family Academic Resource Center.

== General Information ==
As of 2020, Bellarmine's current enrollment size is approximately 1,655 students. The average class size is 22.5 and the student-to-teacher ratio is 13:1. For the Class of 2019, 99.2% of students went on to attend college. 94.7% of graduating seniors were attending a four-year institution.

== Academics ==
Bellarmine requires 6 semesters of Mathematics, 8 semesters of English, 6 semesters of Religious Studies, 4 semesters of Foreign Language, 6 semesters of Science (1 year Physics, 1 year Chemistry, 1 year Biology), 6 semesters of Social Science (1 semester Ethnic Studies, 1 year World History, 1 year U.S. History, minimum 1 semester Sr. year), and 3 Visual/Performing Arts (VPA) Courses. Though that is the minimum, students are recommended to take 8+ semesters of Mathematics, 6+ semesters of Foreign Language, and 7+ semesters of Social Sciences.

=== Honors and AP Program ===
Bellarmine offers 26 AP Classes: AP 2D Art and Design, AP Art History, AP Computer Science A, AP Cybersecurity, AP English Language and Composition, AP English Literature and Composition, AP Calculus AB, AP Calculus BC, AP Precalculus, AP Statistics, AP Biology, AP Chemistry, AP Environmental Science, AP Physics 2, AP Physics C: Electricity & Magnetism, AP Physics C: Mechanics, AP European History, AP Psychology, AP U.S. Government and Politics, AP United States History, AP World History: Modern, AP Chinese Language and Culture, AP French Language and Culture, AP Latin, AP Spanish Language and Culture, and AP Spanish Literature and Culture.

In addition to AP Classes, Bellarmine offers 11 Honors Courses: Algebra 2 Honors, Biology Honors, Chemistry Honors, Economics Honors, English 1 Honors, English 2 Honors, French 3 Honors, Geometry Honors, Latin 3 Honors, Mandarin Chinese 3 Honors, and Spanish 3 Honors.

=== SAT and ACT Statistics ===
Bellarmine has an average SAT score of 1340 and an average ACT score of 33.

== Athletics ==
=== Football ===
The Bells Football team represents Bellarmine College Preparatory in the West Catholic Athletic League (WCAL) of the CIF Central Coast Section. The team has 8 CCS Championships in program history. The Bell's Football team is currently headed by former San Diego Chargers coach and 2-time Super Bowl Champion with the Denver Broncos David Diaz-Infante. In 1965, the John Hanna-coached Bells outscored opponents 310–6 during a 31-game winning streak to earn the first of two state titles (the other was in 1981).

=== Soccer ===
The Bellarmine's 2002 varsity soccer team had a perfect 25-0-0 season. As of 2021, the soccer team has won 3 of the past 5 CCS Open Division titles, a NorCal CIF Division 1 Title, and finished the 2021 season ranked #4 in the nation by Top Drawer Soccer and CBS Sports.

== Co-curricular programs ==
=== Robotics ===
The Bellarmine Robotics Team, named Team 254: The Cheesy Poofs (also simply known as Team 254). The high school competes in two different divisions: FTC and FRC. The team has won the World Chairman's Award (the highest award in FIRST) in 2004, and have 5 individual World Championships, in 2011, 2014, 2017, 2018, and 2022. The team also holds the record for most regional events won, having 44 regional wins to their name. In 2008, Bellarmine first entered VEX Robotics and in 2009–2010 won 16 regional competitions, 7 of them in international competition. In the 2010–2011 season, Bellarmine's VEX team 254A won the VEX World Excellence Award, the highest it confers. In 2014, the team won three regionals, the Curie Division, and World Championships. The school shares a partnership with NASA's Ames Research Center in Mountain View, California. In 2022, Bellarmine's Team 254F won the VEX World Championships in Dallas Texas.

=== Speech & debate ===
Bellarmine Speech and Debate has won numerous awards, including 4 consecutive state titles (2021–2025), and 5 consecutive national titles (2020–2025). It also had a run of 9 years of consecutive state championship wins from 2005 to 2014. In 2021, Bellarmine won the Unger Cup, an award given for their consistent placement in Policy Debate at the 5 great debate tournaments: the National Speech and Debate Tournament, the University of Kentucky Tournament of Champions (UKTOC), the NCFL Grand Debate Tournament, the NAUDL Urban Debate National Championships, and the NDCA National Tournament. In 2021, Bellarmine also won the Bruno E. Jacob Trophy for winning the most rounds at the National Speech and Debate Tournament. In 2022, Bellarmine won the Senator Karl E. Mundt Sweepstake trophy, for earning the most amount of cumulative points in Congressional Debate during the National Speech and Debate Tournament. In 2024, Bellarmine became the 2nd school in history to earn both the 1st and 2nd place national winners in the Policy Debate section of the NSDA US National Tournament. In addition, during the 2024 year, Bellarmine won the Unger Cup for the second time. In 2025, it was ranked as #1 in Speech and Debate by the NSDA after they obtained a national champion in both Lincoln-Douglas (LD) Debate and Original Oratory (OO).

=== Student media & publications ===
In 2008, Bellarmine began its own radio station, KBCP The Bell, as a legal, unlicensed station at 1650 AM which reaches a 1-mile radius of the school. Programs include 30-minute newscasts, sports shows, daily music shows, and political talk radio. Its yearbook service is The Carillon.

== Campus ==
Bellarmine's campus features 5 Academic Buildings (The Lorry I. Lokey Academic Center, the John Sobrato Center for Humanities and the Arts, Mathewson Hall, the James A. Carney Science Center, and the Fr. Wade Academic Center), 2 Administrative Buildings (O'Donnell Hall and the Fr. Shinney Student Life Center), 1 Cafeteria Building (the Samuel Liccardo Campus Center), 1 Chapel (Leontyne Chapel), 2 Gym Building (Patrick Wayne Valley Gym and the Wrestling and Fitness Center), 3 Athletic Fields (Football/Track, Soccer, Baseball), 1 Pool, 1 Library (Mathewson Library), and 1 Garden. The buildings are all named after donors to the school or influential faculty.

The College Park Caltrain station is adjacent to the campus since its inception and has been a historic presence for Bellarmine's metropolitan community. Over 140 students take the train to school every day from San Mateo County to Gilroy. The station is served by only 2 northbound trains and 2 southbound trains a day, timed to correspond with the school's hours. In recent years, amidst discussion of the station shutting down, the school has lobbied Caltrain to avoid cutting service to the station.

== In popular culture ==
- Bellarmine's College Park Caltrain station is mentioned in Jack London's 1903 novel The Call of the Wild as the location at which the stolen canine protagonist is fenced, beginning his journey away from civilization.
- In his 1960 Lonesome Traveler collection, American poet Jack Kerouac writes about watching the Bells play football in "October in the Railroad Earth."

== Notable alumni ==
- Marv Owen (1924) - MLB (1931–1940)
- Nello Falaschi '31 - played for NFL's New York Giants
- John W. Gallivan '33 - publisher of The Salt Lake Tribune, 1960–1984
- Leo Righetti '44 - baseball player
- Conn Findlay '48 - holds four Olympic medals, three in rowing (1956 gold, 1960 bronze, 1964 gold) and one in sailing (1976 bronze)
- Wayne Belardi '48 - MLB first baseman
- John Vasconcellos '50 - California State Senator
- Joe Albanese '51 - Major League Baseball (MLB) pitcher
- Jim Beall '70 - politician
- Dennis Crosby '52 - singer and actor
- Phillip Crosby '52 - singer and actor
- Jim Small '55 - MLB (1955–1958)
- Stephen Schott '57 - former owner of Oakland Athletics
- John A. Sobrato '57 real estate developer
- Billy Connors '59 - MLB pitcher and coach
- Ming Chin '60 - Associate Justice of the Supreme Court of California
- Frank Bergon '61 - writer
- Bob Gallagher '62 - MLB (1972–1975)
- Tom McEnery '63 - 61st Mayor of San Jose
- Dan Pastorini '67 - NFL quarterback (1971–1981, 1983), Super Bowl XV champion; played in 1975 Pro Bowl
- Jim Wilhelm '70 - MLB (1978–1979)
- Frank C. Girardot ‘79 - Author "Name Dropper: Investigating the Clark Rockefeller Mystery"
- Nick Holt '81 - defensive coordinator of Purdue Boilermakers, former head coach of Idaho Vandals
- Sal Cesario '81 - NFL offensive guard
- Erik Howard '82 - played for NFL's New York Giants, New York Jets
- David Diaz-Infante '82 - played for NFL's San Diego Chargers, Denver Broncos, Philadelphia Eagles
- Randy Kirk '83 - NFL (1987–1999)
- Pablo Morales '83 - Olympic gold and silver medalist (1979–1983)
- Tony West '83 - 17th United States Associate Attorney General and current chief legal officer of Uber
- Jim Wahler '84 - played for NFL's Phoenix Cardinals, Washington Redskins
- Greg Gohr '85 - MLB (1993–1996)
- Ron Caragher '85 - NCAA football head coach
- Kelly Grovier '87 - poet and literary critic
- Ed Giovanola '87 - MLB (1995–1999)
- Sam Liccardo '87 - Mayor of San Jose (2015–2023), US Congressman for California (2025–2027)
- Stephen Mirrione '87 - Academy Award-winning film editor for Traffic
- Chris Kelly '87 - Co-Owner Sacramento Kings, Former Chief Privacy Officer Facebook
- Viet Thanh Nguyen '88 - 2016 Pulitzer Prize winner in fiction for his novel The Sympathizer
- Ralph Alvarado '88 - Kentucky State Senator
- Joey Manahan '89 - Hawaii State Representative and Honolulu City Councilman
- John B. Owens '89 - United States Court of Appeals for the Ninth Circuit judge
- Nick Hatzke '91 - MLS player (2007–09), Houston Dynamo
- Gregg Hurwitz '91 - author
- Kevin McMahon '90: track & field athlete at 1996 and 2000 Olympics; teaches in Bellarmine's Visual and Performing Arts department
- Justin Baughman '92 - MLB second baseman
- Pat Burrell '94 - MLB outfielder
- Bassnectar (Lorin Ashton) '96: musician
- Helmy Eltoukhy '97 - co-founder & CEO of biotech startup companies Avantome and Guardant Health
- Kevin Frandsen '00 - MLB player, San Francisco Giants (2006–2015)
- Craig Bragg '00 - National Football League (NFL) wide receiver
- Copeland Bryan '01 - NFL defensive end
- Brian Armstrong '01 - Founder and CEO of Coinbase
- Matt Mahan '01 - 66th Mayor of San Jose
- Sunkrish Bala '02 - actor
- Jose Moreno Brooks '03 - actor
- Francis Maka '03 - linebacker, San Jose SaberCats of Arena Football League
- Eric Thames '04: MLB player (2011–2012, 2017–2020)
- Alex Brightman '05 - actor
- Scott Weltz '05 - U.S. Olympic Swimmer in 2012 Olympics (200 m Breaststroke)
- Tommy Medica '06 - MLB (2013–14)
- Mark Canha '07 - MLB first baseman
- Erik Goeddel '07 - MLB pitcher, New York Mets (2014–present)
- Austyn Carta-Samuels '09 - professional gridiron football player and coach
- Michael Clay '09 - Special teams coordinator for the Philadelphia Eagles
- Marc Pelosi - MLS soccer player, San Jose Earthquakes (2015–2017)
- Mitchell Harrison White '13 - MLB pitcher for the Los Angeles Dodgers
- K. J. Carta-Samuels '14 - professional gridiron football quarterback for the Dresden Monarchs
- Austin Ajiake '18 - NFL linebacker for the Indianapolis Colts
- Brendon Foody '21 - Co-founder & CEO of Mercor, Youngest billionaire (Tied)
- Adarsh Hiremath '21 - Co-founder & CTO of Mercor, Youngest billionaire (Tied)
- Surya Midha '21 - Co-founder & board member of Mercor, Youngest billionaire (Tied)
