= Greg Gohr =

American baseball player (born 1967)

- Pitcher
- Born: October 29, 1967 (age 58); Santa Clara, California, U.S.
- Batted: Right Threw: Right

MLB debut
- April 7, 1993, for the Detroit Tigers

Last MLB appearance
- September 27, 1996, for the California Angels

MLB statistics
- Win–loss record: 8–11
- Earned run average: 6.21
- Strikeouts: 131
- Stats at Baseball Reference

Teams
- Detroit Tigers (1993–1996); California Angels (1996)

Gregory James Gohr (born October 29, 1967) is an American former professional baseball pitcher who played in Major League Baseball (MLB) from 1993 to 1996 for the Detroit Tigers and California Angels. He was drafted in the first round of the 1989 Major League Baseball draft by the Tigers, and traded in 1996 to the Angels for Damion Easley.

In 1996, he posted the highest rate of home runs per 9 innings of any pitcher with at least 110 innings pitched in Major League Baseball history.
