= Frank Girardot =

American historian (born 1961)

- Born: Francis Conway Girardot, Jr. January 1961 (age 65); Detroit, Michigan, United States
- Occupations: Author, journalist, victim advocate
- Children: 3
- Writing career
- Genre: non-fiction
- Subject: True crime
- Notable awards: Southern California Press Association award for investigative journalism, 1995. Finalist for the 2015 University of Florida Award for Investigative Data Journalism
- Website: www.pegasuscommunications-usa.com

Frank Girardot (born January 1961) is an American author, journalist, victim advocate, and radio host. He is best known for "Name Dropper" his biography of serial imposter Christian Gerhartsreiter. He is former senior communications director for BYD Auto's North American operations, CEO of Pegasus Communications, LLC and the former editor and columnist for the San Gabriel Valley Tribune.

== Career ==
Girardot got his start in journalism as a copy boy at the Los Angeles Herald-Examiner. Subsequent to the newspaper's closing, he worked for the Ontario Daily Report, the San Gabriel Valley Tribune and the Pasadena Star-News. His 1994 story on the unsolved murder of Geneva Hilliker Ellroy, the mother of novelist James Ellroy, resulted in Ellroy's book My Dark Places.

Girardot has won several writing awards, including the Southern California Press Association's award for Investigative Journalism 1995, the Los Angeles Press Club's First Place Award for sportswriting in 1998, and he was a finalist for the 2015 University of Florida Award for Investigative Data Journalism in 2015. Girardot headed a project for the Los Angeles Newspaper Group titled "Getting Away with Murder." The effort chronicled 11,242 homicides that occurred in Los Angeles County between 2000 and 2010. Relying on data supplied by the Los Angeles County Department of Coroner the project found that less than 50 percent of all homicides that occurred countywide were ever solved.

=== True crime ===
Girardot is the author of true crime non-fiction books, including Name Dropper, which was cited by author Walter Kirn in his book Blood Will Out. He is co-author with Burl Barer of A Taste For Murder, Betrayal in Blue with Barer and Ken Eurell and Burned, the biography of serial arsonist John Orr. Burned was co-written with Orr's daughter Lori Orr Kovach. All, except Name Dropper, are published by Wild Blue Press. In December 2020, Girardot and his wife Sarah Favot began hosting LA 85, an episodic contextual true crime podcast with a focus on the impact of serial killers including the Night Stalker, Grim Sleeper and Southside Slayer on Los Angeles in 1985.

=== Internet/TV ===
Girardot has appeared on several true crime shows on various cable networks including Investigation Discovery. He has been a frequent guest on Crime Time with Allison Hope Weiner on LipTV. He has also appeared on Fox News and Dateline NBC. His topics of expertise include murder investigation, serial arson, the Los Angeles County Sheriff's Department, Richard Ramirez, Clark Rockefeller John Leonard Orr and 20th Century Los Angeles area true crime.

=== Radio ===
In 2015, Girardot co-hosted the Randy Economy Show in Los Angeles on radio station KRLA.

== Personal life ==
Girardot resides in Pasadena, California. He has three children and is a Roman Catholic. He plays guitar in Thunderheart, a band he formed in Temecula, California, with actor Dean Norris.
