= Susan Hammer =

American politician (1938–2020)

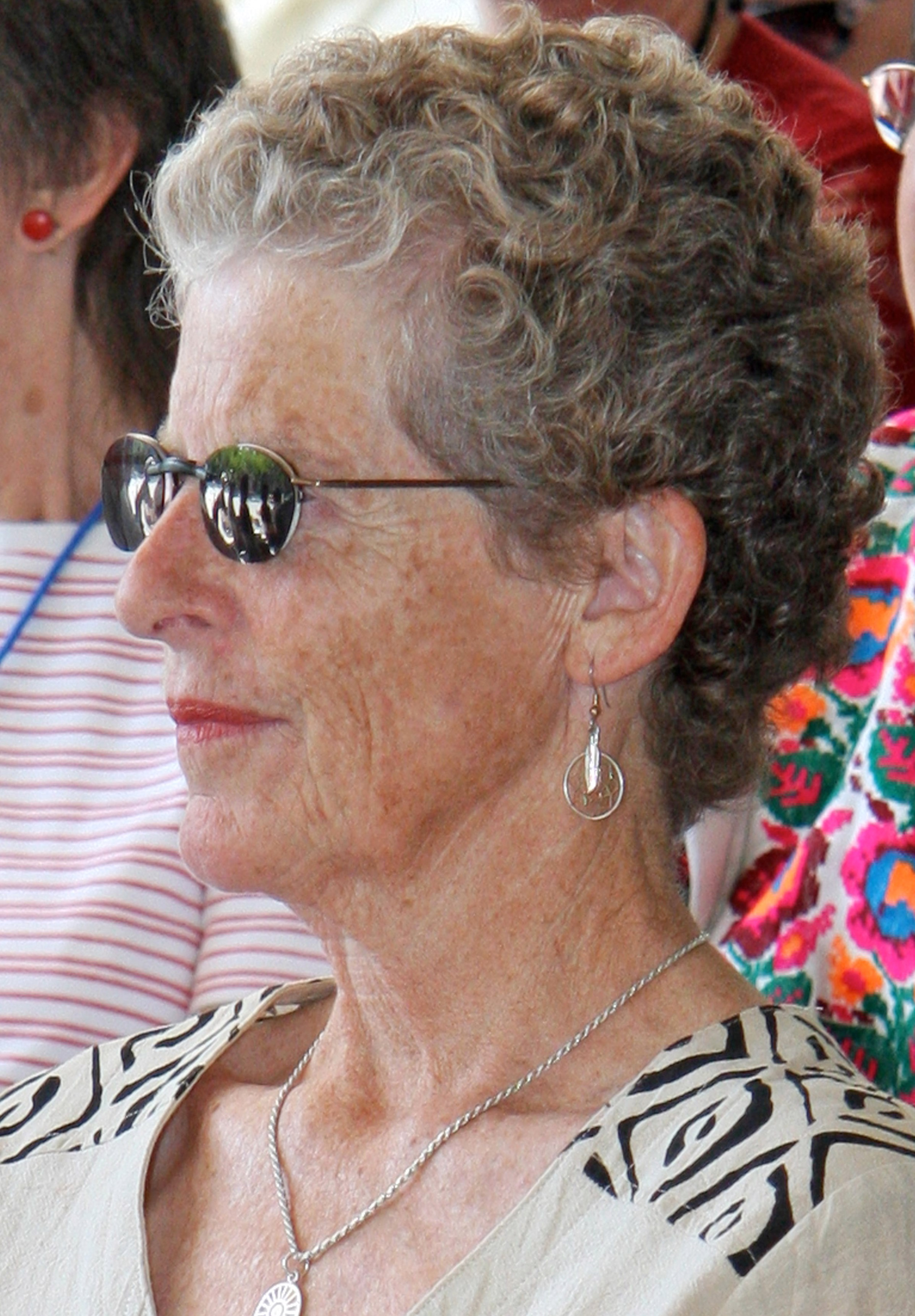

62nd Mayor of San Jose
- In office January 9, 1991 – January 1, 1999
- Preceded by: Tom McEnery
- Succeeded by: Ron Gonzales

San Jose City Councilor from district 3
- In office 1983–1991

Personal details
- Born: Susan Walker; December 21, 1938 Altadena, California, U.S.
- Died: March 7, 2020 (aged 81) San Jose, California, U.S.
- Party: Democratic
- Spouse: Philip Hammer
- Children: 3
- Education: University of California, Berkeley

Susan Walker Hammer (December 21, 1938 – March 7, 2020) was an American politician and member of the Democratic Party, who served as the mayor of San Jose, California, from 1991 to 1999. She was voted best local politician six times. Previous to serving as mayor, she represented San Jose City Council District Three, which encompassed the downtown area of the city, from 1983 to 1991.

Hammer was born in Altadena, California, on December 21, 1938. She attended the University of California, Berkeley. She was married to San Jose attorney Philip Hammer, and had three children and six grandchildren. She was diagnosed with Alzheimer's disease in her later years, and it progressed rapidly over the last several months of her life, leading to her death on March 7, 2020.

== See also ==
- 1990 San Jose mayoral election
- 1994 San Jose mayoral election

Political offices
Preceded by Tom McEnery	Mayor of San Jose; 1991–1999	Succeeded by Ron Gonzales
