= Justin Baughman =

American baseball player (born 1974)

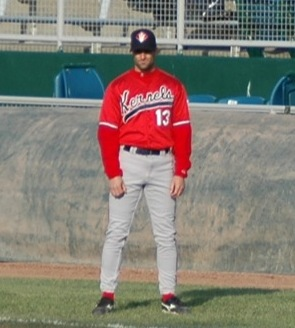
- Baughman as a coach with the Cedar Rapids Kernels in 2005
- Second baseman
- Born: August 1, 1974 (age 51); Mountain View, California, U.S.
- Batted: Right Threw: Right

MLB debut
- May 17, 1998, for the Anaheim Angels

Last MLB appearance
- September 30, 2000, for the Anaheim Angels

MLB statistics
- Batting average: .252
- Home runs: 1
- Runs batted in: 20
- Stats at Baseball Reference

Teams
- Anaheim Angels (1998, 2000)

Justin Reis Baughman (/ˈbɒkmən/; born August 1, 1974) is an American former professional baseball player who played two seasons for the Anaheim Angels of Major League Baseball (MLB).

Baughman attended Lewis & Clark College, graduating in 2001 with a B.S. in business. Baughman was head coach of Lewis & Clark College's varsity baseball team from the fall of 2005 until early January 2010, when he resigned to take a job as the Northwest area scout for the San Diego Padres.
