= Tom McEnery =

American mayor, author, businessman and teacher

61st Mayor of San Jose
- In office January 9, 1983 – January 9, 1991
- Preceded by: Janet Gray Hayes
- Succeeded by: Susan Hammer

Personal details
- Born: Thomas Andrew McEnery; September 23, 1945 (age 80) San Jose, California, U.S.
- Education: Bellarmine College Preparatory; Santa Clara University (BA, MA)

Thomas Andrew McEnery (born September 23, 1945) is an American author, businessman, and teacher from San Jose, California, who served as the 61st mayor of that city from 1983 to 1991.

McEnery attended Santa Clara University, graduating with a B.A. in 1967 and an M.A. in 1970. After his term in office, he served on the board of directors of the San Jose Sharks hockey team and continued to pursue his business and writing career. He co-founded San Jose Inside, a website devoted to the culture and politics of San Jose. McEnery was part of the ownership group for San Jose Sports & Entertainment Enterprises, which owns the San Jose Sharks of the National Hockey League. He is an owner of the Irish Innovation Center and Silicon Valley Global in Downtown San Jose which houses and funds start-up technology ventures.

San Jose's McEnery Convention Center is named in his honor.

== Biography ==
=== Early life and career ===
Tom McEnery was born in San Jose, California on September 23, 1945. His father, John P. "Big John" McEnery, was a member of the Truman administration and Chairman of the California Democratic Party, and an early supporter, confidant, and floor leader for John F. Kennedy at the 1956 and 1960 Democratic Conventions. Tom's maternal grandfather, "Honest Ben" Sellers, was a San Jose city councilman, mayor and leader of the progressive reform movement in the early twentieth century. His mother, Margaret was a key political influence in the life of each of the three political leaders in her life: father, husband and son. McEnery's other grandfather, Patrick McEnery, was editor of the San Jose Mercury Herald.

Attending local schools, including Bellarmine College Preparatory, McEnery earned a BA in business administration and an MA in history from Santa Clara University. His master's thesis was on Michael Collins, Irish republican and the architect of Irish independence, whose key lieutenant, Michael McDonnell, worked for his father, John, for many years. McEnery was a Presidential Fellow at Santa Clara University and lectured for two years at Stanford University's Graduate School of Business. He is a prime mover in the Irish Technology Leadership Group chaired by former Intel CEO, Craig Barrett.

McEnery was President of the family business—the pioneer retail and commercial Farmers Union Corporation—and a spokesman for controlled growth and downtown revitalization as Chairman of the San Jose Planning Commission and a member of the San Jose City Council. He was elected Mayor of San Jose in a landslide victory in the primary of 1982.

=== As mayor of San Jose, California ===
As mayor of San Jose, Tom McEnery led America's tenth largest city for two terms. He presided over an explosion of growth and optimism in San Jose and was rated "the most powerful person in Silicon Valley" by the San Jose Mercury News. As "the youngest big-city mayor in the country," McEnery's key goals were the rebuilding of a viable downtown, fostering economic development, augmenting the police force, and developing youth programs. During his tenure, a new tax base and a new skyline emerged.

He was reelected mayor in another landslide in 1986.

=== As a partner in Farmers Union at San Pedro Square ===
As a partner in Farmers Union at San Pedro Square, McEnery led the effort to privately restore many historic San Jose buildings, placing them on the national, state and city historic registers.

=== The Clean Government Initiative ===
A reformist leader, McEnery led the statewide fight for the Clean Government Initiative, which included reasonable term limits for elected officials and campaign finance reform. In 1992, he led a coalition of community groups, city officials and Silicon Valley corporations in working on the problems of drug and gang violence.

In 1994 he ran for Congress and lost a close primary election.

From 1995 to 1998, McEnery hosted the frequently number-one rated radio show in the valley.

=== Career with the San Jose Sharks ===
As Vice Chairman of the NHL San Jose Sharks from 1994 to 1999, McEnery helped establish youth programs and the successful Sharks Foundation. In 2002, McEnery, Shark CEO Greg Jamison and venture capitalist Kevin Compton formed a local group of Silicon Valley investors to purchase the Sharks and associated interests. McEnery served on the first board of the Silicon Valley Sports and Entertainment until he sold his interest to partner and SAP founder Hasso Plattner.

=== Transition groups ===
McEnery was a member of California Governor-elect Arnold Schwarzenegger's Transition Committee in 2003 and San Jose Mayor-elect Chuck Reed's Transition Group in 2006–07. In 2007, he and Steve Poizner were state co-chairmen of the Voter Reform Initiative. In 2005, he co-founded San Jose Inside, a news and blog site dedicated to exploring San Jose politics and culture, and subsequently sold it to Metro Silicon Valley newspaper. McEnery was a delegate to the 1980, 1984 and 2000 Democratic Conventions pledged to candidates Ted Kennedy and Bill Bradley.

=== Writer ===
==== Books ====
McEnery shares his views on the paths that American cities should take in his book The New City State, published in 1994. He also wrote California Cavalier, a fictional journal written from the perspective of Thomas Fallon. He co-edited and wrote the introduction to A New Ireland, the story of his friend John Hume's struggle for Irish peace and reconciliation. The Irish in the Bay Area, an anthology with an essay by McEnery, was published in 2006. McEnery is currently working on a new book on immigrants and the American dream. He teaches and lectures on a limited basis. His columns frequently appear in papers from California to the Irish Times and London Times.

==== Plays ====
McEnery's short play Swift Justice, based on the award-winning book of the same name, by Harry Farrell, was performed at the Tabard Theatre in San Jose in 2015, and was produced as a full-length play in January 2016.

In 2017, his original comedy A Statue for Ballybunion made its original premiere in Dublin, Ireland at the O'Reilly Theatre. It was directed by Paul Meade and starred John Olohan. The comedy was scheduled to make its U.S. premiere on St. Patrick's Day 2020 at 3Below Theaters & Lounge in downtown San Jose but was postponed due to the COVID-19 pandemic. A Statue for Ballybunion is based on the true story of a group of Ballybunion, Ireland, residents who hatch a cunning plan to unveil the world's first statue of the leader of the free world — then-U.S. president, William Jefferson Clinton. However, well-publicized events in the Oval Office with a certain intern put his visit to “The Kingdom of Kerry” in jeopardy. The production will be directed by former San Jose Repertory Theatre Associate Artistic Director John McCluggage, a professional theatre artist with over 30 years of experience as a director and teaching artist. Santa Clara University faculty members Jerald Enos and Derek Duarte have been announced as Set Designer and Lighting Director, respectively.

=== Cinequest San Jose Film Festival and Bytes for Belfast ===
McEnery is the Founding Chairman of the Cinequest San Jose Film Festival.

He was a founder and trustee of Bytes for Belfast, a program linking Silicon Valley expertise with Northern Ireland community efforts, using new technologies to expand the social and economic opportunities open to the youth in inner-city Belfast and Derry.

=== Awards and recognition ===
The Silicon Valley Business Hall of Fame selected McEnery as its first politician inductee, and Focus magazine put him on the 100-member Bay Area "Brain Trust" in 1995. He was the first American to receive the Lord Mayor's Award in Dublin, Ireland. The San Jose Tech Museum of Innovation honored him in 1998 as its Inspiration Award Winner. He was selected as one of the "Top 100" Irish Americans by the magazine Irish America, in 2011 was named to the "Silicon Valley 50".

=== Personal ===
Tom McEnery and his wife Jill have three grown daughters and six grandchildren, and still reside on the same downtown San Jose street where he was raised and four generations of their families have lived.

Political offices
Preceded by Janet Gray Hayes	Mayor of San Jose; 1983–1991	Succeeded by Susan Hammer
