= Norman Mineta =

American politician (1931–2022)

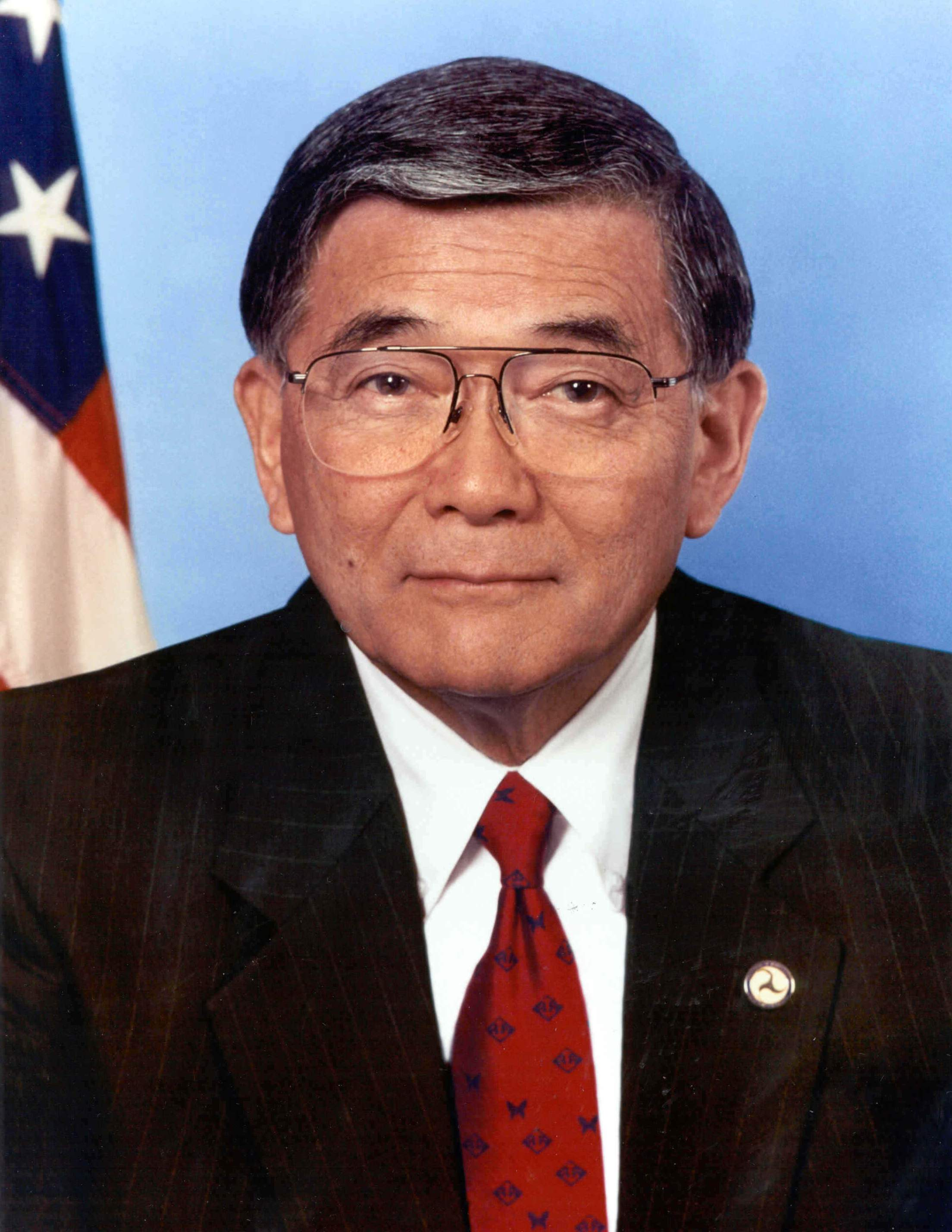
- Official portrait, c. 2001

14th United States Secretary of Transportation
- In office January 25, 2001 – July 7, 2006
- President: George W. Bush
- Preceded by: Rodney Slater
- Succeeded by: Mary Peters

33rd United States Secretary of Commerce
- In office July 21, 2000 – January 20, 2001
- President: Bill Clinton
- Preceded by: William M. Daley
- Succeeded by: Donald Evans

Ranking Member of the House Transportation Committee
- In office January 3, 1995 – October 10, 1995
- Preceded by: Bud Shuster
- Succeeded by: Jim Oberstar

Chair of the House Transportation Committee
- In office January 3, 1993 – January 3, 1995
- Preceded by: Bob Roe
- Succeeded by: Bud Shuster

Member of the U.S. House of Representatives from California
- In office January 3, 1975 – October 10, 1995
- Preceded by: Robert Lagomarsino (redistricted)
- Succeeded by: Tom Campbell
- Constituency: 13th district (1975–1993); 15th district (1993–1995)

59th Mayor of San Jose
- In office January 9, 1971 – January 9, 1975
- Preceded by: Ron James
- Succeeded by: Janet Gray Hayes

Personal details
- Born: Norman Yoshio Mineta; November 12, 1931 San Jose, California, U.S.
- Died: May 3, 2022 (aged 90) Edgewater, Maryland, U.S.
- Resting place: Oak Hill Memorial Park
- Party: Democratic
- Spouse(s): May Hinoki (m. 1961; div. 1986) Deni Brantner (m. 1991)
- Children: 2
- Education: University of California, Berkeley (BS)

Military service
- Allegiance: United States
- Branch/service: United States Army
- Unit: Army Military Intelligence Corps
- Mineta's voice Mineta supporting the Intermodal Surface Transportation Efficiency Act. Recorded October 23, 1991

Norman Yoshio Mineta (November 12, 1931 – May 3, 2022) was an American politician and U.S. Army officer who served as a Cabinet secretary in the administrations of President Bill Clinton, a Democrat, and George W. Bush, a Republican. He was a member of the Democratic Party, and was the highest-ranking East Asian American in the federal executive branch in American history.

Mineta served as Mayor of San Jose, California, from 1971 to 1975. He served as a member of the United States House of Representatives from 1975 to 1995. Mineta served as the United States secretary of commerce during the final months of Bill Clinton's presidency. He was the first person of East Asian descent to serve as a U.S. Cabinet secretary and the first Asian American mayor of a major U.S. city.

As the United States secretary of transportation for President Bush, Mineta was the only Democratic cabinet secretary in the Bush administration. He oversaw the creation of the Transportation Security Administration in response to the September 11 attacks that had occurred early in his tenure. On June 23, 2006, Mineta announced his resignation after more than five years as secretary of transportation, effective July 7, 2006, making him the longest-serving secretary of transportation in the department's history. A month later, the public relations firm Hill & Knowlton announced that Mineta would join it as a partner. In 2010, it was announced that Mineta would join L&L Energy as vice chairman. San Jose International Airport is named after him.

Mineta died on May 3, 2022, from a heart ailment in Edgewater, Maryland, at age 90.

== Early life and education ==
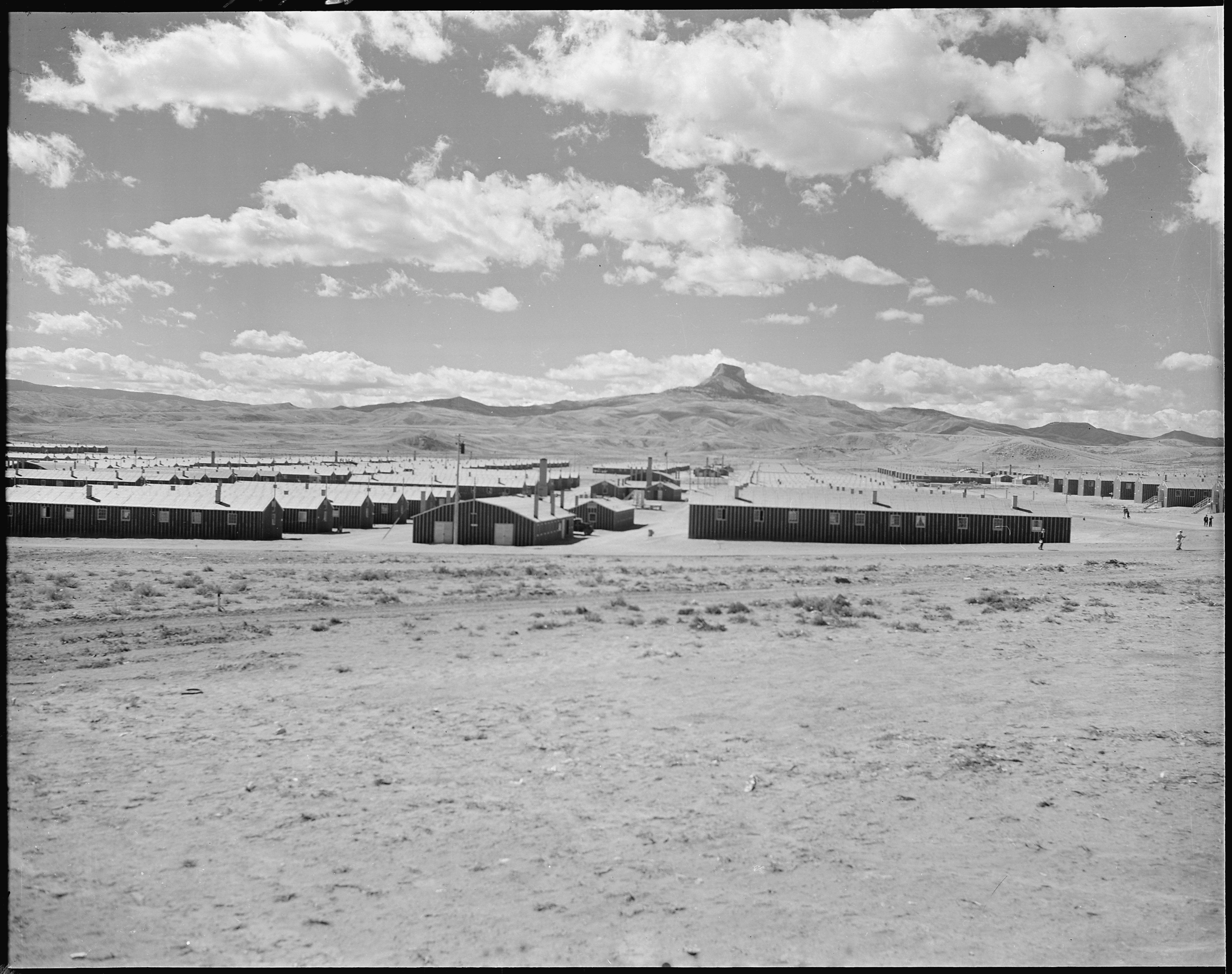
Heart Mountain Relocation Center, the concentration camp near Cody, Wyoming where Mineta's family were incarcerated, along with 10,000 other American citizens of Japanese heritage.

Norman Yoshio Mineta was born on November 12, 1931, in San Jose, California, to Japanese immigrant parents Kunisaku Mineta and Kane Watanabe, who were barred from becoming American citizens at that time by the Immigration Act of 1924.

During World War II, the Mineta family was interned for several years at Area 24, 7th Barracks, Unit B, in the Heart Mountain Relocation Center near Cody, Wyoming, along with thousands of other Japanese immigrants and Japanese Americans. Upon arrival to the camp, Mineta, a baseball fan, had his baseball bat confiscated by authorities because it could be used as a weapon. Many years later, after Mineta was elected to the U.S. House of Representatives, a man sent Mineta a $1,500 bat that was once owned by Hank Aaron, which Mineta was forced to return as it violated the congressional ban on gifts valued over $250. Mineta said: "The damn government's taken my bat again."

While detained in the camp, Mineta, a Boy Scout, met fellow scout Alan Simpson, a future United States Senate member from Wyoming, who often visited the Boy Scouts in the internment camp with his troop. The two became close friends and remained political allies throughout their lives.

Mineta graduated from the University of California, Berkeley's School of Business Administration in 1953 with a degree in business administration. Upon graduation, he joined the United States Army and served as a military intelligence officer in Japan and South Korea. Mineta then joined his father in the Mineta Insurance Agency.

== Career ==
=== Councilman and mayor of San Jose ===
In 1967, Mineta was appointed to a vacant San Jose City Council seat by mayor Ron James. He was elected to office for the first time after completing a term in the city council. Mineta was elected vice mayor by fellow councilors during that term.

Mineta ran against 14 other candidates in the 1971 election to replace outgoing mayor Ron James. Mineta won every precinct in the election with over 60% of the total vote and became the 59th mayor of San Jose, the first Japanese-American mayor of a major American city. As mayor, Mineta ended the city's 20-year-old policy of rapid growth by annexation, creating development-free areas in East and South San Jose. His vice mayor, Janet Gray Hayes, succeeded Mineta as mayor in 1975.

=== United States Congress ===
In 1974, Mineta ran for the United States House of Representatives in what was then California's 13th congressional district. The district was previously the 10th District, represented by retiring 11-term Republican Charles Gubser. Mineta won the Democratic nomination and defeated California State Assembly member George W. Milias with 52 percent of the vote. He was reelected 10 more times from this Silicon Valley–based district, which was renumbered as the 15th District in 1993, never dropping below 57 percent of the vote.

Mineta co-founded the Congressional Asian Pacific American Caucus and served as its first chair. He served as chairman of the United States House Committee on Transportation and Infrastructure from 1992 to 1994. He chaired the committee's aviation subcommittee between 1981 and 1988, and chaired its Surface Transportation subcommittee from 1989 to 1991.

During his career in Congress, Mineta was a key author of the landmark Intermodal Surface Transportation Efficiency Act. He pressed for more funding for the Federal Aviation Administration. Mineta was a driving force in the House of Representatives behind the passage of H.R. 442, while Senator Spark Matsunaga (Hawaii) "almost single-handedly" got the legislation passed in the Senate of the 100th Congress which became the Civil Liberties Act of 1988, a law that officially apologized for and redressed the injustices endured by Japanese Americans during World War II.

=== Private sector ===
Mineta resigned his seat mid-term to accept a position with Lockheed Martin in 1995. He chaired the National Civil Aviation Review Commission, which in 1997 issued recommendations on minimizing traffic congestion and reducing the aviation accident rate. The Clinton administration adopted many of the commission's recommendations, including reform of the Federal Aviation Administration to enable it to perform more like a business.

In 1999, Mineta received the L. Welch Pogue Award for Lifetime Achievement in Aviation. He was appointed to the board of directors of Horizon Lines effective January 1, 2007. Mineta had formerly served on the board of AECOM Technology Corporation and was on the board of SJW Corp.

=== Secretary of commerce ===
In 2000, President of the United States Bill Clinton nominated Mineta to serve as the United States Secretary of Commerce, making him the first Asian American to hold a presidential cabinet post. Clinton had wanted to nominate Mineta as United States Secretary of Transportation in 1992, but Mineta wanted to remain in Congress at that time.

=== Secretary of transportation ===
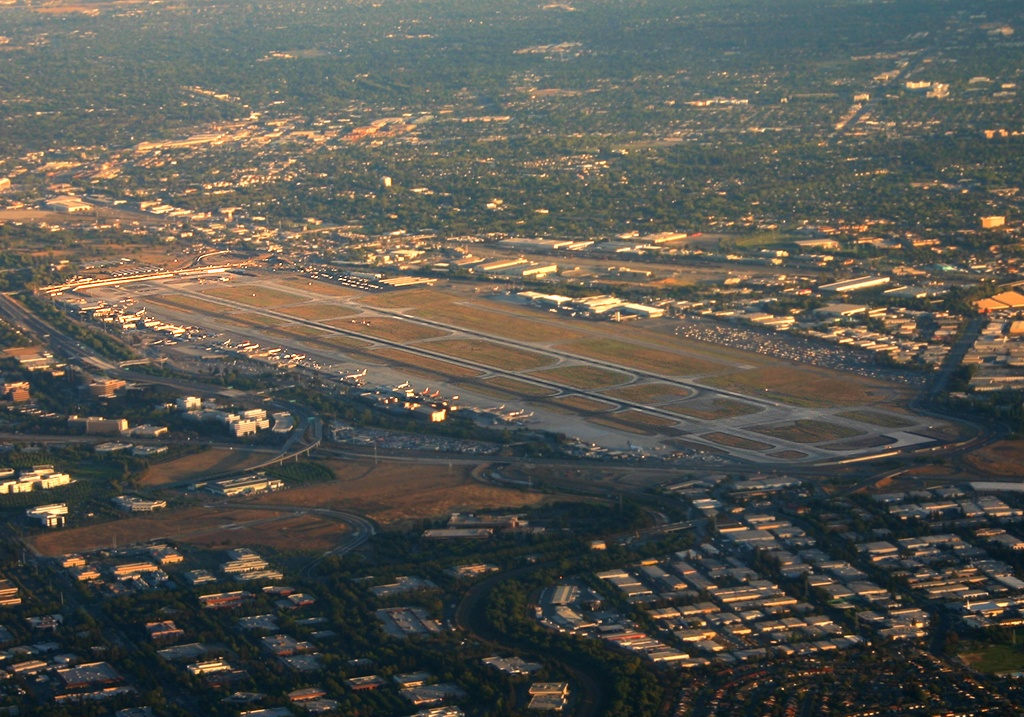
San José International Airport now named after Mineta

Mineta was appointed United States Secretary of Transportation by President George W. Bush in 2001, a post that he was offered eight years earlier by Bill Clinton. Mineta was the only Democratic Party government official to have served in Bush's cabinet and the first Secretary of Transportation to have previously served in a cabinet position. He became the first Asian American to hold the position, and only the fourth person to be a member of the cabinet under two presidents from different political parties (after Edwin Stanton, Henry L. Stimson and James R. Schlesinger). In 2004, Mineta received the Tony Jannus Award for his distinguished contributions to commercial air transportation.

Following Bush's reelection, Mineta was invited to continue in the position, and he did so until resigning in June 2006. When Mineta stepped down on July 7, 2006, he was the longest-serving Secretary of Transportation since the position's inception in 1967.

==== September 11 attacks ====
Mineta's testimony to the 9/11 Commission about his experience in the Presidential Emergency Operations Center with Vice President of the United States Dick Cheney as American Airlines Flight 77 approached The Pentagon was not included in the 9/11 Commission Report. In one colloquy testified by Mineta, the vice president refers to orders concerning the plane approaching the Pentagon:

There was a young man who had come in and said to the vice president, "The plane is 50 miles out. The plane is 30 miles out." And when it got down to, "The plane is 10 miles out," the young man also said to the vice president, "Do the orders still stand?" And the vice president turned and whipped his neck around and said, "Of course the orders still stand. Have you heard anything to the contrary?" Well, at the time I didn't know what all that meant.

— Norman Mineta, 9/11 Commission

Commissioner Lee Hamilton queried if the order was to shoot down the plane, to which Mineta replied that he did not know that specifically.

Mineta's testimony to the commission on Flight 77 differs somewhat significantly from the account provided in the January 22, 2002, edition of The Washington Post, as reported by Bob Woodward and Dan Balz in their series "10 Days in September".

9:32 a.m.

The Vice President in Washington: Underground, in Touch With Bush

Transportation Secretary Norman Y. Mineta, summoned by the White House to the bunker, was on an open line to the Federal Aviation Administration operations center, monitoring Flight 77 as it hurtled toward Washington, with radar tracks coming every seven seconds. Reports came that the plane was 50 miles out, 30 miles out, 10 miles out—until word reached the bunker that there had been an explosion at the Pentagon.

Mineta shouted into the phone to Monte Belger at the FAA: "Monte, bring all the planes down." It was an unprecedented order—there were 4,546 airplanes in the air at the time. Belger, the FAA's acting deputy administrator, amended Mineta's directive to take into account the authority vested in airline pilots. "We're bringing them down per pilot discretion," Belger told the secretary.

"Fuck pilot discretion," Mineta yelled back. "Get those goddamn planes down."

Sitting at the other end of the table, Cheney snapped his head up, looked squarely at Mineta and nodded in agreement.

— Dan Balz and Bob Woodward, The Washington Post

This same article reports that the conversation between Cheney and the aide occurred at 9:55 a.m., about 30 minutes later than the time that Mineta had cited (9:26 a.m.) during his testimony to the 9/11 Commission.

After hearing of Mineta's orders, Canadian transport minister David Collenette issued orders to ground all civilian aircraft traffic across Canada, resulting in Operation Yellow Ribbon. On September 21, 2001, Mineta sent a letter to all US airlines forbidding them from practicing racial profiling or subjecting Middle Eastern or Muslim passengers to a heightened degree of pre-flight scrutiny. He stated that it was illegal for the airlines to discriminate against passengers based on race, color, national or ethnic origin, or religion. Subsequently, administrative enforcement actions were brought against three airlines based on alleged infringements of these rules, resulting in multimillion-dollar settlements. Mineta voiced his intention to "absolutely not" implement racial screenings in a 60 Minutes interview just after 9/11. He later recalled his decision "was the right thing [and] constitutional" based on his own experience as a member of those who had "lost the most basic human rights" as a result of the internment of Japanese Americans during World War II.

The San Jose International Airport in San Jose was named after Mineta in November 2001 while he was serving as Secretary of Transportation. The Mineta Transportation Institute, located at San Jose State University, and portions of California State Route 85 are named after him.

White House Press Secretary Tony Snow announced on June 23, 2006, that Mineta would resign effective July 7, 2006, because "he wanted to." A spokesman said Mineta was "moving on to pursue other challenges." He left office as the longest-serving Secretary of Transportation in history.

=== After leaving the Bush administration ===
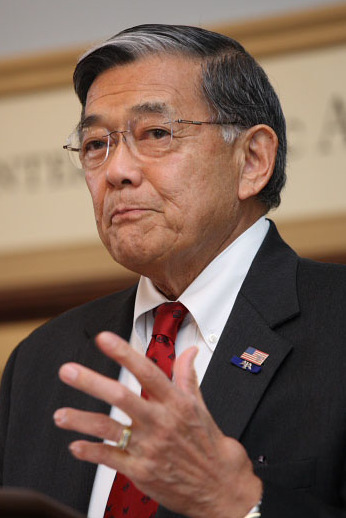
Mineta in 2009

Hill & Knowlton announced on July 10, 2006, that Mineta would join the firm as vice chairman, effective July 24, 2006.

In 2005, Mineta received the Golden Plate Award of the American Academy of Achievement presented by Awards Council member and Google co-founder Larry Page. In October 2006, he won the Wright Brothers Memorial Trophy. Two months later, Mineta was awarded the Presidential Medal of Freedom. In 2007, the Japanese government conferred upon him the Grand Cordon, Order of the Rising Sun.

On February 4, 2008, the day before the closely contested California Democratic primary, Mineta endorsed Barack Obama.

Beginning in the summer of 2008, Mineta began service as chairman of a panel of the National Academy of Public Administration overseeing a study of modernization efforts at the United States Coast Guard. Other notable members of the panel include former director of United States Office of Personnel Management Janice Lachance and former NASA (National Aeronautics and Space Administration) administrator Sean O'Keefe.

In June 2010, Mineta was named co-chair of the Joint Ocean Commission Initiative. On August 10, 2010, he was named vice chair of L&L Energy, Inc., which was headquartered in Seattle and operated coal mines and other facilities related to coal production in China.

Mineta was a recipient of the Chubb Fellowship at Yale University from 2015 to 2016.

== Legacy ==
The Mineta Transportation Institute was named after him. It was established by Congress in 1991 as a research institute focusing on issues related to intermodal surface transport in the United States. It is part of San Jose State University's Lucas Graduate School of Business in San Jose, California, and is currently directed by Karen Philbrick.

In 2001, while Mineta was serving as the United States Secretary of Transportation, the San Jose International Airport adopted his name to honor him. In 2024, a statue was erected there in Mineta's honor.

On September 15, 2008, California State Route 85, a freeway connecting the South San Jose area with Mountain View, California, was also designated the Norman Y. Mineta Highway in remembrance of Mineta.

In 2022, Congress renamed the Department of Transportation headquarters building as the William T. Coleman, Jr. and Norman Y. Mineta Federal Building, in honor of Mineta and another former Secretary, William Thaddeus Coleman Jr.

== Personal life ==
Mineta's first marriage was to May Hinoki, which lasted from 1961 to 1986. In 1991, he married United Airlines flight attendant Danealia "Deni" Brantner. Mineta had two children from his first marriage and two stepchildren from Brantner's previous marriage. He had 11 grandchildren.

Mineta died on May 3, 2022, from a heart ailment in Edgewater, Maryland, at age 90.

== Electoral results ==
Norm Mineta electoral history

1974 United States House of Representatives elections in California
| Party | Candidate | Votes | % |
|---|---|---|---|
| Democratic | Norm Mineta | 78,649 | 52.6 |
| Republican | George W. Milias | 63,381 | 42.4 |
| Peace and Freedom | Elizabeth Cervantes Barron | 3,846 | 2.6 |
| American Independent | Floyd S. Stancliffe | 3,738 | 2.5 |
| Total votes | | 149,614 | 100.0 |
| Turnout | | | |
| Democratic gain from Republican | | | |

1976 United States House of Representatives elections in California
| Party | Candidate | Votes | % |
|---|---|---|---|
| Democratic | Norm Mineta (Incumbent) | 135,291 | 66.8 |
| Republican | Ernie Konnyu | 63,130 | 31.2 |
| American Independent | William Pollock Herrell | 4,190 | 2.1 |
| Total votes | | 202,611 | 100.0 |
| Turnout | | | |
| Democratic hold | | | |

1978 United States House of Representatives elections in California
| Party | Candidate | Votes | % |
|---|---|---|---|
| Democratic | Norm Mineta (Incumbent) | 100,809 | 57.5 |
| Republican | Dan O'Keefe | 69,306 | 39.5 |
| Peace and Freedom | Robert Goldsborough III | 5,246 | 3.0 |
| Total votes | | 175,361 | 100.0 |
| Turnout | | | |
| Democratic hold | | | |

1980 United States House of Representatives elections in California
| Party | Candidate | Votes | % |
|---|---|---|---|
| Democratic | Norm Mineta (Incumbent) | 132,246 | 58.9 |
| Republican | W. E. "Ted" Gagne | 79,766 | 35.5 |
| Libertarian | Ray Strong | 8,806 | 3.9 |
| Peace and Freedom | Robert Goldsborough | 3,791 | 1.7 |
| Total votes | | 224,609 | 100.0 |
| Turnout | | | |
| Democratic hold | | | |

1982 United States House of Representatives elections in California
| Party | Candidate | Votes | % |
|---|---|---|---|
| Democratic | Norm Mineta (Incumbent) | 110,805 | 65.9 |
| Republican | Tom Kelly | 52,806 | 31.4 |
| Libertarian | Al Hinkle | 4,553 | 2.7 |
| Total votes | | 168,164 | 100.0 |
| Turnout | | | |
| Democratic hold | | | |

1984 United States House of Representatives elections in California
| Party | Candidate | Votes | % |
|---|---|---|---|
| Democratic | Norm Mineta (Incumbent) | 139,851 | 65.2 |
| Republican | John D. "Jack" Williams | 70,666 | 33.0 |
| Libertarian | John R. Redding | 3,836 | 1.8 |
| Total votes | | 214,353 | 100.0 |
| Turnout | | | |
| Democratic hold | | | |

1986 United States House of Representatives elections in California
| Party | Candidate | Votes | % |
|---|---|---|---|
| Democratic | Norm Mineta (Incumbent) | 107,696 | 69.7 |
| Republican | Bob Nash | 46,754 | 30.3 |
| Total votes | | 154,450 | 100.0 |
| Turnout | | | |
| Democratic hold | | | |

1988 United States House of Representatives elections in California
| Party | Candidate | Votes | % |
|---|---|---|---|
| Democratic | Norm Mineta (Incumbent) | 143,980 | 67.1 |
| Republican | Luke Somner | 63,959 | 29.8 |
| Libertarian | John H. Webster | 6,583 | 3.1 |
| Total votes | | 214,522 | 100.0 |
| Turnout | | | |
| Democratic hold | | | |

1990 United States House of Representatives elections in California
| Party | Candidate | Votes | % |
|---|---|---|---|
| Democratic | Norm Mineta (Incumbent) | 97,286 | 58.0 |
| Republican | David E. Smith | 59,773 | 35.7 |
| Libertarian | John H. Webster | 10,587 | 6.3 |
| Total votes | | 167,646 | 100.0 |
| Turnout | | | |
| Democratic hold | | | |

1992 United States House of Representatives elections in California
| Party | Candidate | Votes | % |
|---|---|---|---|
| Democratic | Norm Mineta (Incumbent) | 168,617 | 63.5 |
| Republican | Robert Wick | 82,875 | 31.2 |
| Libertarian | Duggan Dieterly | 13,293 | 5.0 |
| No party | Futrell (write-in) | 585 | 0.2 |
| Total votes | | 265,370 | 100.0 |
| Turnout | | | |
| Democratic hold | | | |

1994 United States House of Representatives elections in California
| Party | Candidate | Votes | % |
|---|---|---|---|
| Democratic | Norm Mineta (Incumbent) | 119,921 | 59.90 |
| Republican | Robert Wick | 80,266 | 40.09 |
| No party | Liu (write-in) | 17 | 0.01 |
| Total votes | | 200,204 | 100.0 |
| Turnout | | | |
| Democratic hold | | | |

== See also ==
- List of United States political appointments across party lines
- List of Asian Americans and Pacific Islands Americans in the United States Congress

Political offices
| Preceded by Ron James | Mayor of San Jose; 1971–1975 | Succeeded by Janet Hayes |
| Preceded by Bill Daley | United States Secretary of Commerce; 2000–2001 | Succeeded by Donald Evans |
| Preceded by Rodney Slater | United States Secretary of Transportation; 2001–2006 | Succeeded by Mary Peters |
U.S. House of Representatives
| Preceded by Bob Lagomarsino | Member of the U.S. House of Representatives from California's 13th congressional district 1975–1993 | Succeeded by Pete Stark |
| Preceded by Gary Condit | Member of the U.S. House of Representatives from California's 15th congressional district 1993–1995 | Succeeded by Tom Campbell |
| Preceded by Bob Roe | Chair of the House Transportation Committee; 1993–1995 | Succeeded by Bud Shuster |
| New office | Chair of the Congressional Asian Pacific American Caucus; 1994–1995 | Succeeded by Patsy Mink |
| Preceded by Bud Shuster | Ranking Member of the House Transportation Committee; 1995 | Succeeded by Jim Oberstar |
