= Government of San Jose, California =

City of San José
- Seal of San Jose
- Formation: March 27, 1850; 175 years ago
- City charter: San José City Charter
- Website: sanjoseca.gov

Legislative branch
- Legislature: San Jose City Council
- Meeting place: San Jose City Hall

Executive branch
- Mayor: Mayor of San Jose
- Appointed by: Election

The government of San Jose, officially the City of San José, operates as a charter city within California law under the San José City Charter. The elected government of the city, which operates as a council–manager government, is composed of the Mayor of San Jose (currently Matt Mahan), the San Jose City Council, and several other elected offices.

The greater public administration of San Jose includes numerous entities, including the San Jose Police Department, the San Jose Fire Department, and the San Jose Public Library, as well as a mix of state and county level institutions.

== Organization ==
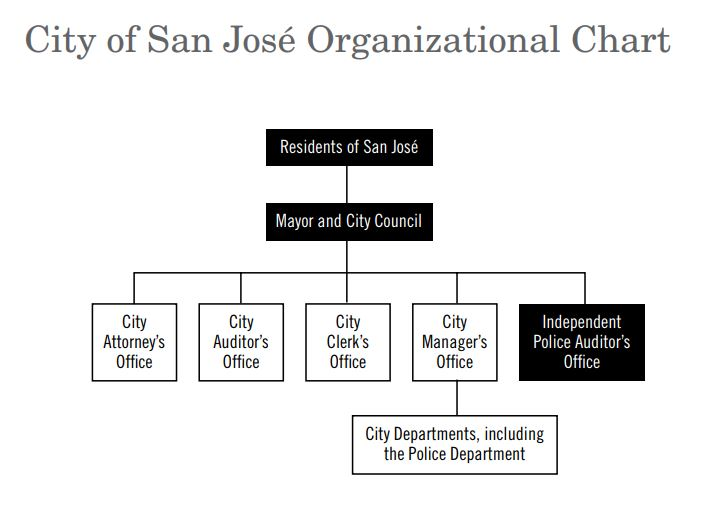
City of San Jose organizational chart.

San Jose utilizes a council–manager government, composed of the mayor, city council, several elected officers, and numerous other entities.

=== Mayor ===
==== Current mayor ====
The current mayor of San Jose is Matt Mahan, beginning his first term as a councilmember, in 2020 and as mayor in 2025.

=== City Council ===
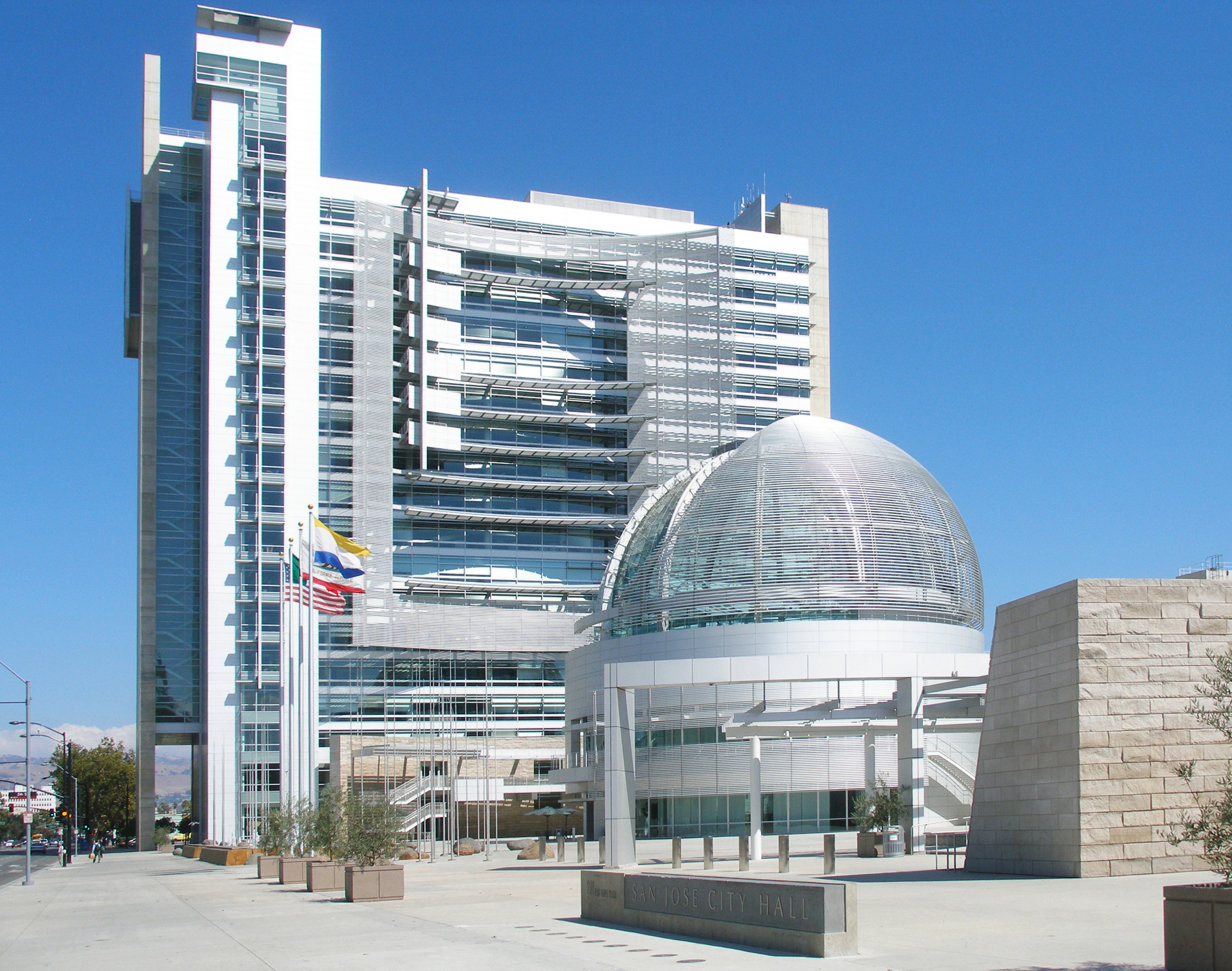
San Jose City Hall is the seat of the Government of San Jose.

The legislative body is composed of the 11-member San Jose City Council, which is made up of 10 councilmembers, each representing and elected by a district, and the Mayor of San Jose elected citywide. The City Council is empowered by the City Charter to formulate citywide policy, adopt laws or ordinances, and approve city budgets.

=== Council appointees ===
The City Council appoints five officials to manage the City organization and support the City Council for effective governance:

- City Manager
- City Auditor
- City Clerk
- City Attorney
- Independent Police Auditor
