= Sherman Otis Houghton =

American politician (1828–1914)

Sherman O. Houghton
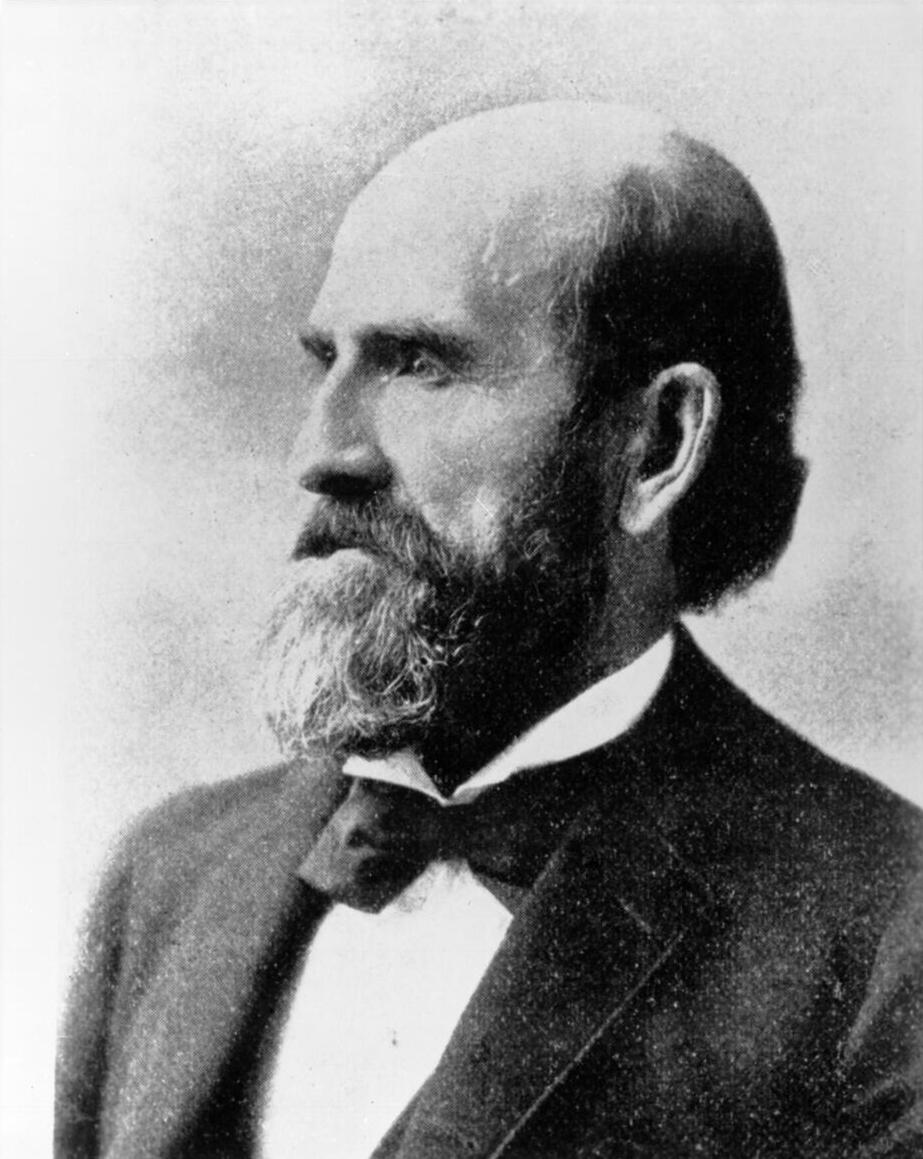
- Houghton c. 1890–1900

4th Mayor of San Jose, California
- In office 1855–1856
- Preceded by: O.H. Allen
- Succeeded by: Lawrence Archer

Member of the U.S. House of Representatives from California
- In office March 4, 1871 – March 3, 1875
- Preceded by: Samuel B. Axtell
- Succeeded by: Peter D. Wigginton
- Constituency: 1st district (1871–1873); 4th district (1873–1875)

Personal details
- Born: Sherman Otis Houghton; April 10, 1828 New York City, US
- Died: August 31, 1914 (aged 86) Hynes, California, US
- Resting place: Angelus-Rosedale Cemetery
- Party: Republican
- Spouses: Eliza Poor Donner (m. 1861) Mary Martha Donner (m. 1859)
- Education: Collegiate Institute

Military service
- Allegiance: United States
- Branch/service: United States Army
- Rank: Lieutenant Colonel
- Battles/wars: Mexican–American War Civil War

Sherman Otis Houghton (April 10, 1828 – August 31, 1914) was an American politician from California, serving during his career as both a U.S. representative and the mayor of San Jose. He also married, in succession, two survivors of the Donner Party.

== Biography ==
=== Early life and education ===
Houghton was born in New York City on April 10, 1828. He completed preparatory studies and attended Collegiate Institute in New York.

=== Career ===
During the Mexican–American War, Houghton enlisted in the 1st Regiment of New York Volunteers, in June 1846. He arrived in San Francisco, California, in 1847 with the rest of his regiment after sailing around Cape Horn. The regiment garrisoned Santa Barbara, before capturing the city of La Paz in Baja California. He was honorably discharged as a lieutenant at Monterey, California, in October 1848.

Houghton then proceeded to mine for gold during the California Gold Rush, and after about six months of mining, he moved to San Jose and entered various commercial businesses. He served as the deputy clerk of the Supreme Court of California in 1854, the same year he was elected to the San Jose Common Council. He was elected the fourth Mayor of San Jose, California from 1855 to 1856. He studied law and was admitted to the bar in 1857, and commenced practice in San Jose.

=== Civil War ===
During the Civil War, Houghton was commissioned as a captain and promoted to lieutenant colonel, and served successively as inspector and ordnance officer.

=== Congress ===
After the war, he was elected as a Republican to the Forty-second and Forty-third Congresses (March 4, 1871 – March 3, 1875), beating out Democrat Lawrence Archer twice. He was the chairman of the House Committee on Coinage, Weights, and Measures for the Forty-third Congress.

He was an unsuccessful candidate for reelection in 1874 to the Forty-fourth Congress.

=== Later career ===
He was appointed commissioner to investigate the affairs of the United States Mint at San Francisco in 1881, and moved to Los Angeles in 1886, where he continued the practice of law.

== Personal life ==
In 1859, he married Mary Martha Donner, a survivor of the Donner Party; she died a year later, most likely from complications related to the birth of their only child, also named Mary. In 1861, he married his late wife's first cousin and fellow Donner Party survivor Eliza Poor Donner, with whom he had an additional seven children.

== Death ==
Sherman Houghton died on August 31, 1914, aged 86, in Hynes, California. He is interred in Angelus-Rosedale Cemetery, Los Angeles.

== Legacy ==
The Donner-Houghton House, a historic building in downtown San Jose, was built by Houghton in 1881. The building was placed on the National Register of Historic Places in 2002. A number of proposals have been made to either restore or renovate it. The structure was almost completely destroyed by a fire on the morning of July 19, 2007.

== Electoral history ==
1870 United States House of Representatives elections
| Party | Candidate | Votes | % |
|---|---|---|---|
| Republican | Sherman Otis Houghton | 25,971 | 51.6 |
| Democratic | Lawrence Archer | 24,374 | 48.4 |
| Total votes | | 50,345 | 100.0 |
| Republican gain from Democratic | | | |

1874 United States House of Representatives elections
| Party | Candidate | Votes | % |
|---|---|---|---|
| Democratic | Peter D. Wigginton | 15,649 | 48.8 |
| Republican | Sherman Otis Houghton (Incumbent) | 11,090 | 34.6 |
| Independent | J. S. Thompson | 5,343 | 16.7 |
| Total votes | | 32,082 | 100.0 |
| Turnout | | | |
| Democratic gain from Republican | | | |

== Bibliography ==
- "Eliza Poor Donner". Utahcrossroads.org.. Genealogical history of the Donner family.

United States Congress. "HOUGHTON, Sherman Otis (id: H000815)". Biographical Directory of the United States Congress.

- "Santa Clara County Biographies: HON. SHERMAN OTIS HOUGHTON". cagenweb.com. Archived from the original on May 6, 2005.
- "Sherman O. Houghton: Republican". JoinCalifornia: Election History for the State of California.

Political offices
| Preceded by O. H. Allen | Mayor of San Jose; 1855–1856 | Succeeded by Lawrence Archer |
U.S. House of Representatives
| Preceded by Samuel B. Axtell | Member of the U.S. House of Representatives from California's 1st congressional district 1871–1873 | Succeeded by Charles Clayton |
| New district | Member of the U.S. House of Representatives from California's 4th congressional district 1873–1875 | Succeeded by Peter D. Wigginton |
