= Joseph Pace =

Joseph Pace may refer to:

- Joseph Pace (artist), Italian painter and sculptor
- Joseph L. Pace, American physician and politician, mayor of San Jose, California
- Giuseppe Pace, translated as Joseph Pace, bishop of Gozo
- Joe Pace (basketball), American basketball player
- Joe Pace (musician), American gospel music songwriter, producer, and musician
