= Lawrence Archer =

American politician, judge (1820–1910)

Lawrence Washington Archer
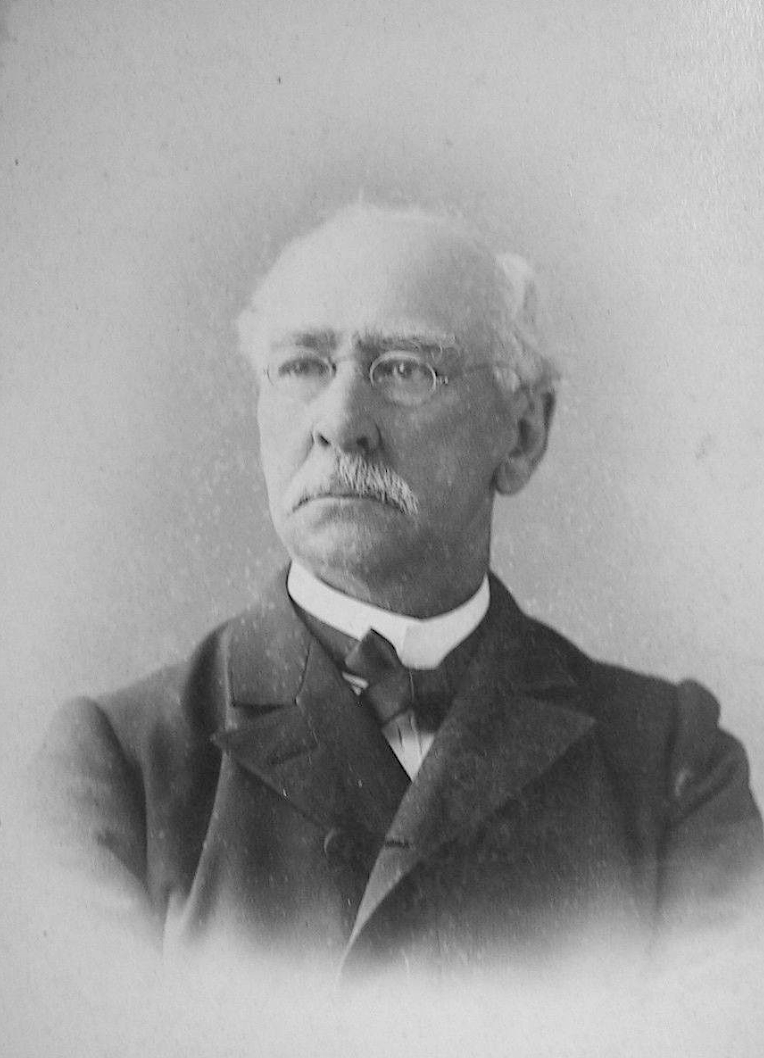
- Archer, c. 1890

Mayor of San Jose, California
- In office April 16, 1856 – July 21, 1856
- Preceded by: Sherman Otis Houghton
- Succeeded by: John Marion Murphy Sr.

California State Assembly, District 7
- In office 1875–1877

Mayor of San Jose, California
- In office 1878–1880
- Preceded by: George B. McKee
- Succeeded by: Bernard D. Murphy

Personal details
- Born: November 11, 1820 Anderson County, South Carolina, U.S.
- Died: February 13, 1910 (aged 89) San Jose, California, U.S.
- Resting place: Oak Hill Memorial Park
- Party: Democratic
- Spouse(s): Louise Martin (m. 1848–1869; her death); Alice Bethell (m. 1870–1910; his death)
- Relations: Martin Flavin (grandson)
- Children: 6
- Occupation: Lawyer, judge, politician

Lawrence Washington Archer (November 11, 1820 – February 13, 1910) was an American lawyer, judge, politician, and was an early settler in San Jose, California. He served two terms as the Mayor of San Jose, California; and one term in the California State Assembly for District 7 in 1875. Archer was a Democrat.

== Early life and education ==
Lawrence Washington Archer was born on November 11, 1820, in Anderson County, South Carolina. His family was from the State of Virginia and of English heritage. Archer's father John was a merchant, and his mother Ann (née Mosley) died when he was 15 years old. He attended the University of Virginia for six months. Followed by a study of law in Abbeville, South Carolina, under Armisted Burt.

== Career ==
Archer passed the Mississippi bar exam in 1841, and practiced law in Yazoo County for two years. In Yazoo County, Archer contracted malaria and moved to St. Joseph, Missouri in 1843 for his health. In St. Joseph, Missouri he was appointed by the governor as a district attorney. In 1850, Archer shared a legal office with James Craig in St. Joseph.

Archer arrived in California in 1852, first staying in San Francisco for two months, followed by a move to San Jose in January 1853.

Archer served two terms as the Mayor of San Jose: first in 1856, followed by a second term in 1875. In 1868, he was elected as a Santa Clara County Judge, a role he served until he resigned 1871.

Archer was a member of the Regents of the University of California (formerly known as the Board of Regents) from 1868 until 1880.

He ran on the Democratic ticket for the 1870 United States House of Representatives elections, and the 1871 United States House of Representatives elections in California, against Sherman Otis Houghton, and he lost both times.

He served one term in the California State Assembly for District 7 in 1875.

In 1884, Archer was a delegate from California to Democratic National Convention in Chicago, Illinois.

== Estate ==
In 1861, Archer purchased the Lone Oak estate and farm in San Jose, California with 160 acres (65 ha) of land, featuring cherry, prune and apricot fruit orchards. The 4 acres (1.6 ha) planted with cherry trees yielded an average annual income of US$3,000 (equivalent to $110,000 in 2025). The estate house he constructed was destroyed in a fire in May 1909, and a new estate house was completed on February 16, 1910, the day before Archer died.

== Personal life ==
His first marriage was in 1848 to Louise Martin from St. Joseph, Missouri, together they had three children. His first wife Louise died in 1869.

His second married was in 1870 to Alice Bethell from Indiana, with whom he had three more children. A few his children died in childhood.

== Death and legacy ==
Archer died at age 89 of apoplexy (stroke) on February 13, 1910, at his home in San Jose, California. He was buried at Oak Hill Memorial Park in San Jose. His funeral was attended by many members of the Santa Clara County Society of California Pioneers.

After Archer's death, his daughter Louise Ann Archer Kelley inherited the Lone Oak estate. The house and 63 acres (25 ha) of land were sold to the City of San Jose in August 1951, to be used as a public park with the condition that Louise Kelley be allowed to live there for the rest of her life. Archer's former estate was used to form Kelley Park in San Jose.

He was the namesake of Archer Street (now known as Fountain Alley) in San Jose.
