= Peter D. Wigginton =

American politician (1839–1890)

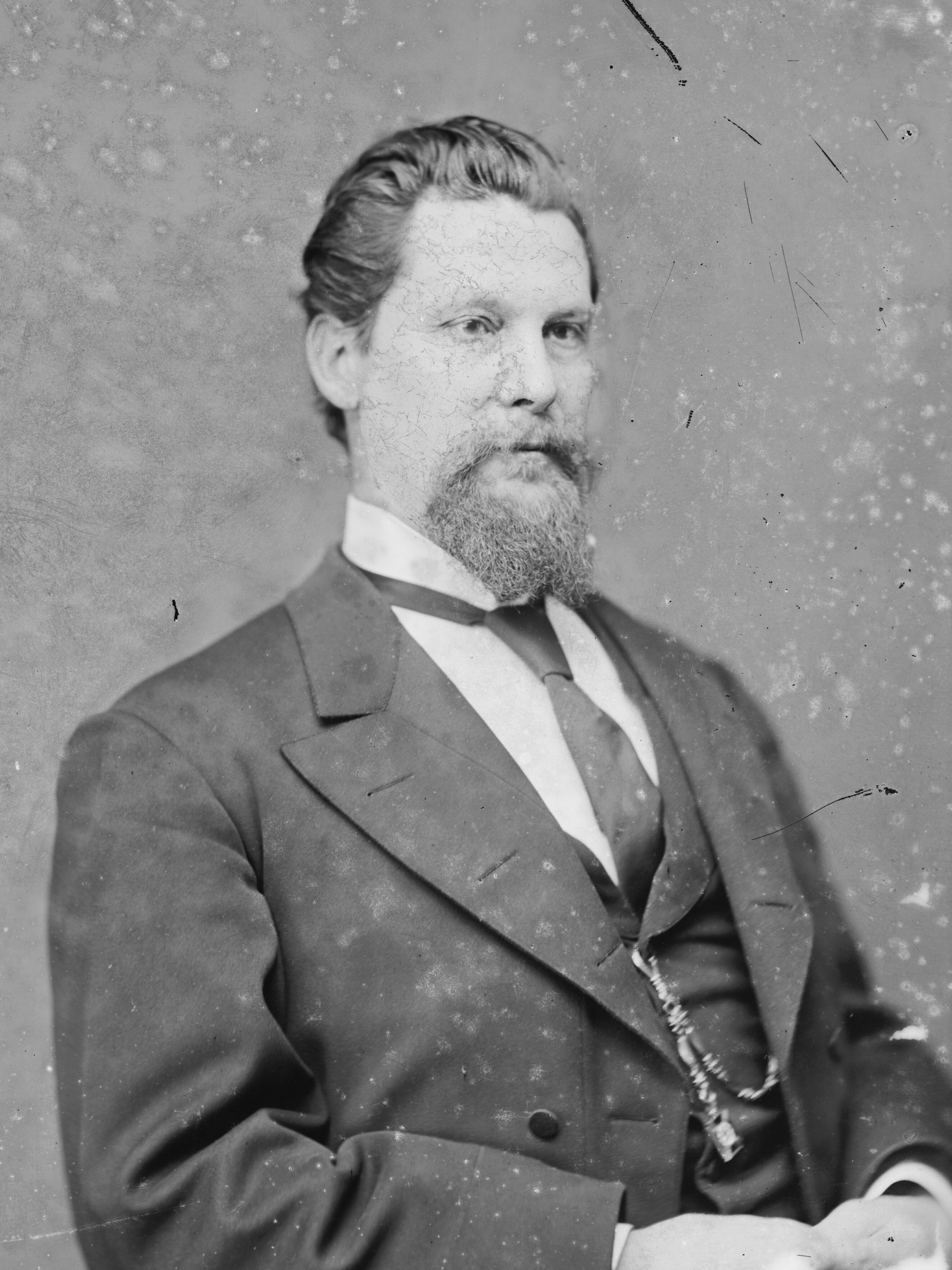
- Portrait by Brady c. 1875–1879

Member of the U.S. House of Representatives from California's 4th district
- In office February 7, 1878 – March 4, 1879
- Preceded by: Romualdo Pacheco
- Succeeded by: Romualdo Pacheco
- In office March 4, 1875 – March 3, 1877
- Preceded by: Sherman Otis Houghton
- Succeeded by: Romualdo Pacheco

Personal details
- Born: Peter Dinwiddie Wigginton; September 6, 1839 Springfield, Illinois
- Died: July 7, 1890 (aged 50) Oakland, California
- Resting place: Mountain View Cemetery, Oakland
- Party: Democratic Party (until 1886), American Party (1886–1890)
- Profession: Lawyer, politician

Peter Dinwiddie Wigginton (September 6, 1839 – July 7, 1890) was an American lawyer and politician who served as a U.S. representative from California during the 1870s.

== Biography ==
Born in Springfield, Illinois, Wigginton moved to Wisconsin with his parents in 1843. He completed preparatory studies and attended the University of Wisconsin–Madison. He studied law and was admitted to the bar in 1859 and started his practice. He was editor of the Dodgeville (Wisconsin) Advocate. He moved to Snelling, California, in 1862, and continued the practice of law. He served as district attorney of Merced County 1864–1868.

=== Congress ===
Engraving by J. A. J. Wilcox, 1882

Wigginton was elected as a Democrat to the 44th Congress (March 4, 1875 – March 3, 1877). After apparently losing re-election in 1876 to Romualdo Pacheco, Wigginton successfully contested Pacheco's election to the 45th Congress and was seated in his place, serving out the term (February 7, 1878 – March 4, 1879). Wigginton did not seek re-nomination.

He settled in San Francisco in 1880 and resumed the practice of law. In 1886, Wigginton founded the American Party, a nativist third party. He would go on to be nominated by the party as its candidate for vice president in 1888.

=== Death ===
He died in Oakland, California, July 7, 1890. He was interred in Mountain View Cemetery.

== Electoral history ==
1874 United States House of Representatives elections
Party	Candidate	Votes	%
Democratic	Peter D. Wigginton	15,649	48.8
Republican	Sherman Otis Houghton (Incumbent)	11,090	34.6
Independent	J. S. Thompson	5,343	16.7
Total votes		32,082	100.0
Turnout			
Democratic gain from Republican			

1876 United States House of Representatives elections
Party	Candidate	Votes	%
Republican	Romualdo Pacheco	19,104	50.0
Democratic	Peter D. Wigginton (Incumbent)	19,103	50.0
Total votes		38,207	100.0
Turnout			
Republican gain from Democratic			

U.S. House of Representatives
Preceded by Sherman O. Houghton	Member of the U.S. House of Representatives from California's 4th congressional district 1875–1877	Succeeded by Romualdo Pacheco
Preceded by Romualdo Pacheco	Member of the U.S. House of Representatives from California's 4th congressional district 1878–1879	Succeeded by Romualdo Pacheco
