= L&L Energy =

L&L Energy Inc.
- Company type: Public (OTC Pink: LLEN)
- Industry: Metals and Mining
- Founded: 1995
- Defunct: March 2, 2015
- Headquarters: Seattle, Washington, United States
- Area served: People's Republic of China
- Key people: Dickson V. Lee (CEO); Clayton Fong (Vice President); Ian G. Robinson (CFO)
- Products: Coal
- Services: Coal production

L&L Energy, Inc. was an American company headquartered in Seattle, Washington, in the business of producing, processing, and selling coal in the People's Republic of China.

As of 2011, the company was focused on acquiring small-scale coal mining operations in China, as well as supplies of American coal that it planned to process and sell in China.

The company was de-listed from the NASDAQ in April 2014, shortly following the announcement of investigations of the company by the SEC and Department of Justice. In 2015, the U.S. District Court sentenced the company to five years of probation, and CEO Dickson Lee (Now Ted Lee) to a five-year prison term for securities fraud. Lee was accused of misrepresenting the company's chief financial officer and internal controls in order to achieve a stock market listing, and of deceiving investors. However, he was not arrested.

Former U.S. Transportation Secretary Norman Mineta at one time served on the board of the company.
