= Mayor of San Jose, California =

Elective public office in San Jose, California, United States

Mayor of the City of San José
- Seal of San José

- Flag of San Jose

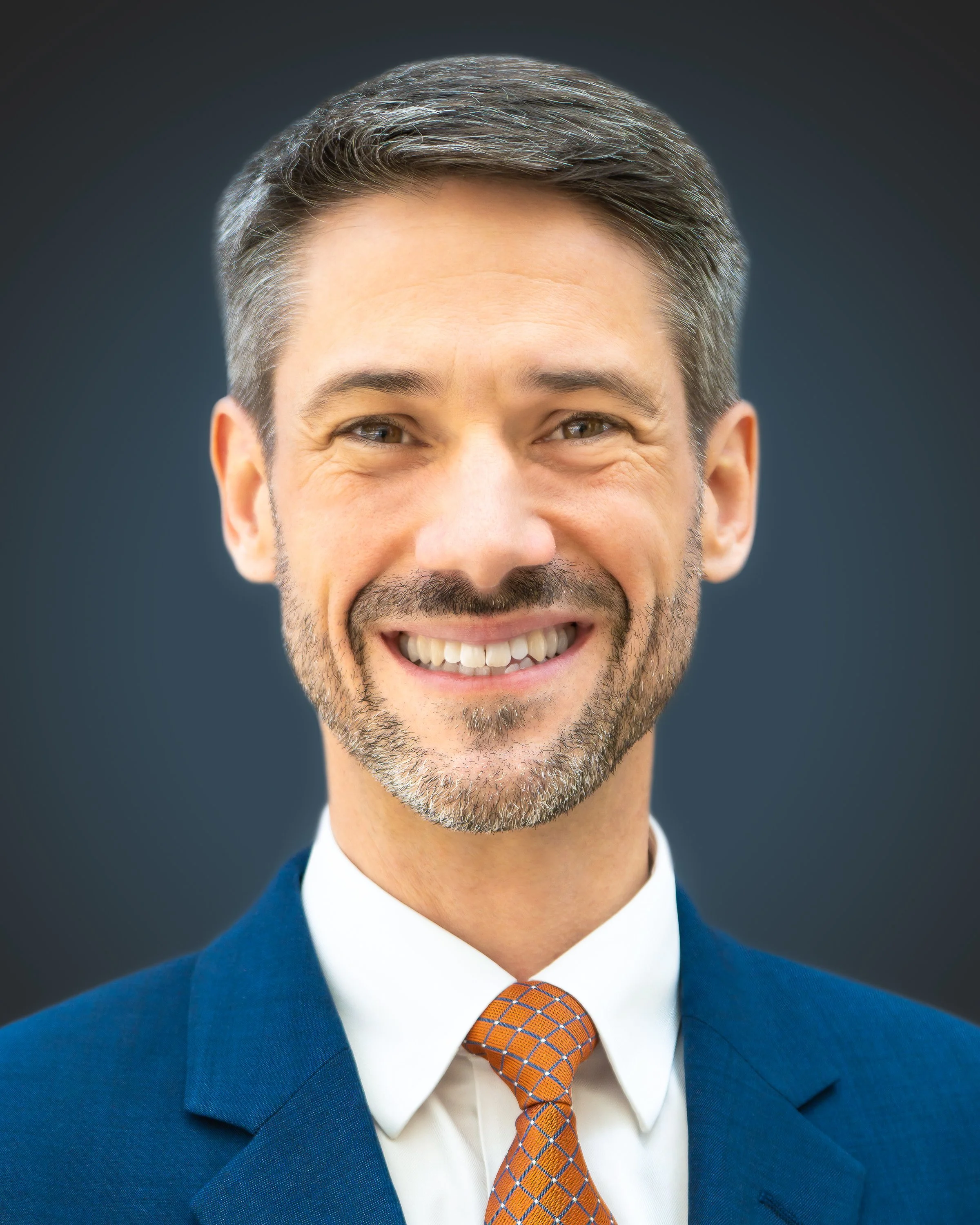
- Incumbent; Matt Mahan since January 1, 2023
- Term length: Four years, renewable once
- Inaugural holder: Josiah Belden
- Formation: 1850
- Website: Office of the Mayor

The Mayor of San Jose, officially the Mayor of the City of San José, is executive of the Government of the City of San Jose, California in the United States.

The mayor presides over the San Jose City Council, which is composed of 11 voting members, including the mayor. While the mayor is the head of the city council, they have no veto powers over legislation passed by the council, as the city uses a council-manager form of government. The mayor serves a four-year term and is limited to two successive terms.

65 people have served as mayor in San Jose since 1850, when California became a state following the American Conquest of California. Before the conquest, Californios served as Mayor of San Jose during the Spanish and Mexican eras since 1777. The current mayor is Democrat Matt Mahan, who took office in January 2023.

== List ==
=== Mayors since 1850 ===
Before 1967, the mayors of San Jose were nominated and elected by the San Jose City Council.

#	Picture	Mayor	Term start	Term end	Notes
1		Josiah Belden	April 13, 1850	1851	
2		Thomas W. White	April 15, 1851	1854	
3		O. H. Allen	December 5, 1854	1855	
4		Sherman Otis Houghton	April 12, 1855	1856	
5		Lawrence Archer	April 16, 1856	July 21, 1856	
6		John Marion Murphy Sr.	July 21, 1856	August 5, 1856	
7		George Givens	August 5, 1856	April 13, 1857	
8		Ranson G. Moody	1857	1858	
9		Peter O. Minor	1858	1859	
10		Thomas Fallon	1859	1860	
11		Richard B. Buckner	1860	1861	
12		Joseph W. Johnson	1861	1863	
13		John Alonzo Quinby	1863	1868	
14		Mark Leavensworth	1868	1870	
15		Adolph Pfister	1870	1873	
16		Bernard D. Murphy	1873	1877	
17		George B. McKee	1877	1878	
18		Lawrence Archer	1878	1880	
19		Bernard D. Murphy	1880	1882	
20		Charles J. Martin	1882	1884	
21		Campbell Thompson Settle	1884	1886	
22		Charles Wesley Breyfogle	1886	1887	
23		Samuel Watson Boring	1887	1890	
24		Samuel Newton Rucker	1890	1894	
25		Paul P. Austin	1894	1896	
26		Valentine Koch	1896	1898	
27		Charles J. Martin	1898	1902	
28		George D. Worswick	1902	1906	
29		Henry D. Mathews	1906	1908	
30		Charles W. Davison	1908	1910	
31		Thomas Monahan	1910	1914	
32		Fred R. Husted	1914	1916	
33		Elmer E. Chase	1916	1918	
34		Charles M. O'Brian	1918	1920	
35		Albert C. Jayet	1920	1922	
36		M. E. Arnerich	1922	1924	
37		Joseph T. Brooks	1924	1926	
38		Dan W. Gray	1926	1928	
39		Fred Doerr	1928	1930	
40		W. L. Biebrach	1930	1932	
41		A. M. Meyer	1932	1934	
42		Charles Bishop	1934	1936	
43		Richard French	1936	1938	
44		Clyde L. Fischer	1938	1940	
45		Harry Young	1940	1944	
46		Earl Campbell	1944	1945	
47		Ernie Renzel	1945	1946	
48		Albert J. Ruffo	1946	1948	
49		Fred Watson	1948	1950	
50		Clark L. Bradley	1950	1952	
51		Parker Hathaway	1952	1954	
52		George Starbird	1954	1956	
53		Robert Doerr	1956	1958	
54		Louis Solari	1958	1960	
55		Paul Moore	1960	1962	
56		Robert Welch	1962	1964	
57		Joseph L. Pace	1964	1967	

=== Popularly elected mayors (1967-present) ===
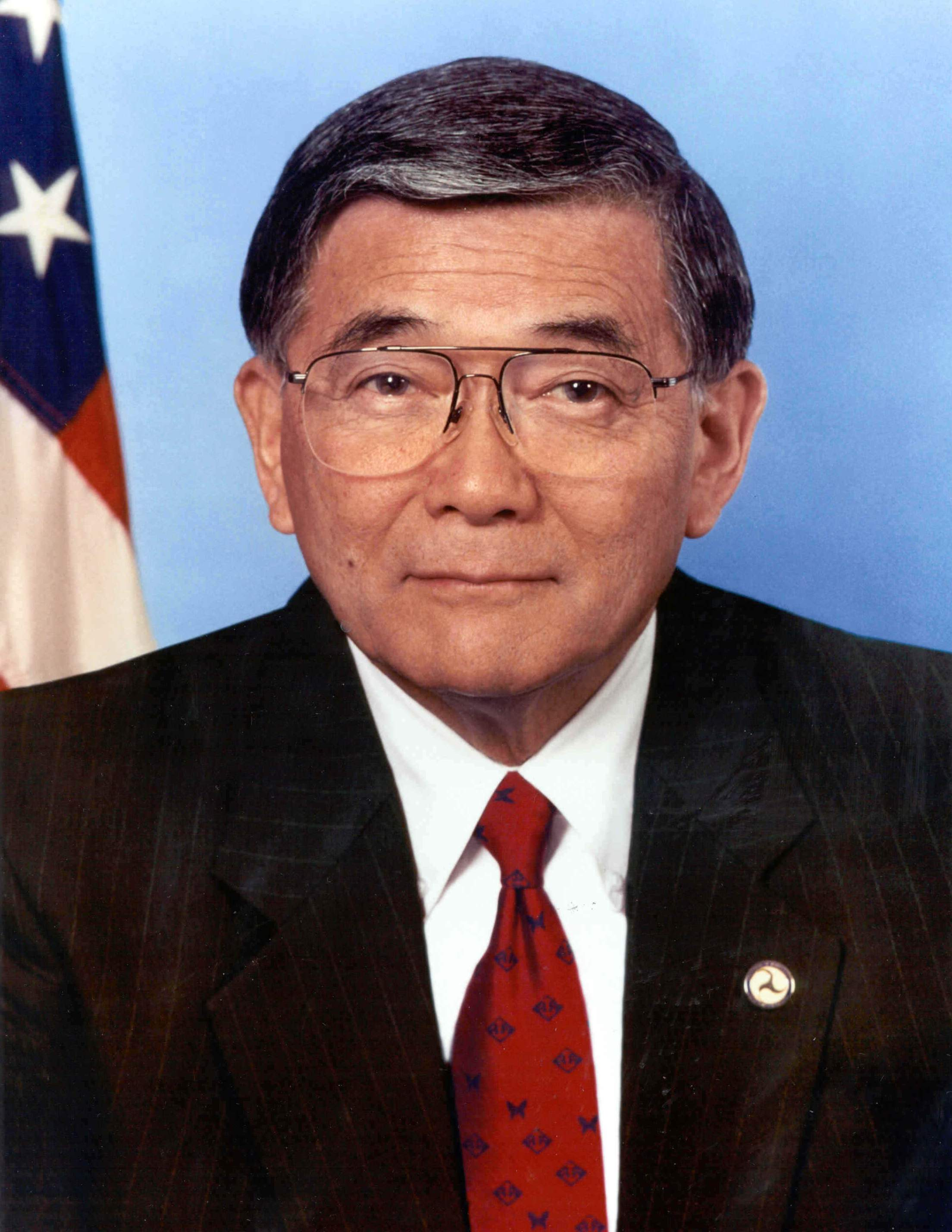
Norman Y. Mineta, 59th mayor of San Jose

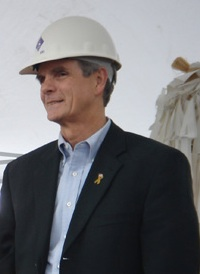
Chuck Reed, 64th mayor of San Jose

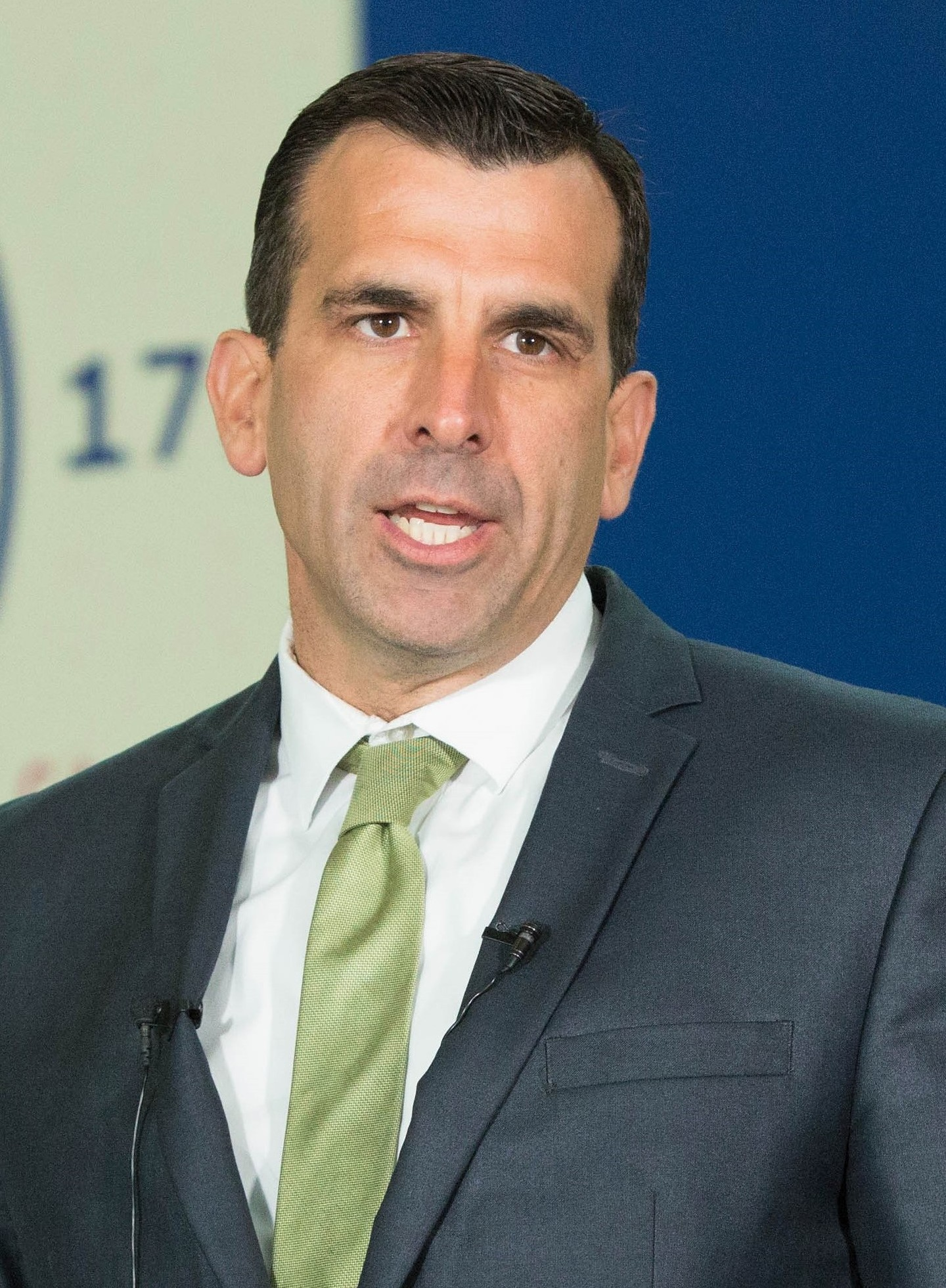
Sam Liccardo, 65th mayor of San Jose

Since 1967, San Jose has elected its mayors by popular vote. Due to state laws regarding primary elections, political parties cannot nominate candidates for mayor, although candidates often choose to identify with a party. All registered candidates, regardless of party affiliation, compete in an election held in June of even-numbered years which are non-leap years. If no person gets over 50% of the popular vote, the top two candidates automatically move to a runoff election. Mayors are limited to two terms.

All elected mayors of San Jose have been members of the Democratic Party. The first elected mayor was Ron James and the first female mayor was Janet Gray Hayes.

#	Picture	Mayor	Term start	Term end	Party
58		Ron James	January 9, 1967	January 9, 1971	Democratic
59		Norman Mineta	January 9, 1971	January 9, 1975	Democratic
60		Janet Gray Hayes	January 9, 1975	January 9, 1983	Democratic
61		Tom McEnery	January 9, 1983	January 9, 1991	Democratic
62		Susan Hammer	January 9, 1991	January 1, 1999	Democratic
63		Ron Gonzales	January 1, 1999	January 1, 2007	Democratic
64		Chuck Reed	January 1, 2007	January 1, 2015	Democratic
65		Sam Liccardo	January 1, 2015	January 1, 2023	Democratic
66		Matt Mahan	January 1, 2023	incumbent	Democratic

== See also ==
- Timeline of San Jose, California
- List of pre-statehood mayors of San Jose

== Notes ==
^{1}Elmer E. Chase was the first mayor who was not the city's chief executive; the city moved to a council-manager government corresponding to his election. Chase and all following mayors are simply the president of the city council.
