= Albert J. Ruffo =

American politician

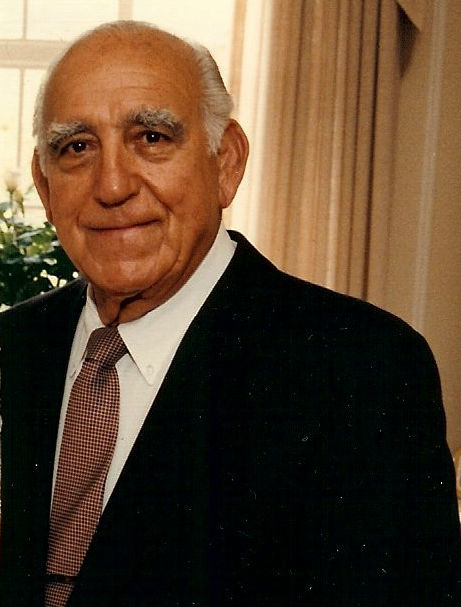
- Ruffo at Granddaughter's Wedding, 1992
- Born: July 1, 1908; Tacoma, Washington, U.S.
- Died: February 10, 2003 (aged 94)
- Education: Santa Clara University; Santa Clara University School of Law
- Occupations: Politician, Philanthropist, Educator, Lawyer, Football Coach.

Albert J. Ruffo (July 1, 1908 – February 10, 2003) was an American politician, philanthropist, educator, lawyer, and football coach.

Ruffo grew up in Tacoma, Washington. In 1927 he moved to San Jose, California to attend nearby Santa Clara University, where he played football, and graduated with degrees in political science, electrical engineering, and literature. After graduating in 1931, Ruffo taught in the university's school of engineering and coached the freshman football team to help pay for attending law school. In 1936 he graduated at the head of his class from Santa Clara University School of Law. After passing the bar exam, he continued to coach football with the university as the assistant varsity coach under legendary SCU head coach Lawrence T. "Buck" Shaw and helped lead the team to victory in the 1937 and 1938 Sugar Bowls against LSU.

In San Francisco, Ruffo and a former college football teammate, Tony Morabito, became partners in a lumber delivery business. But Morabito soon began to focus on starting a pro football franchise and Ruffo was enlisted to set up the legal framework for what was to become Morabito's San Francisco 49ers, who began play in the All-America Football Conference (AAFC) in 1946. While waiting for the 49ers' (and the AAFC's) first season of operation Buck Shaw and Ruffo spent the 1945 season as head coach and assistant for the University of California Golden Bears.

He was an assistant coach to Buck Shaw for the 49ers first two years of operation, which happened to be while he was serving as mayor of San Jose, California. He later became a part owner of the team and remained so for 24 years until it was sold to Eddie DeBartolo, Jr. in 1977.

He served eight years on the San Jose city council (1944–1952), and was the city's 48th mayor from 1946 to 1948. During his time on the council, A. P. Hamann, another of Ruffo's teammates at Santa Clara, was hired as city manager and the rapid growth of San Jose began. After leaving public office, Ruffo worked as an attorney, specializing in land development law; Ruffo represented land developers in many of the city's annexation and zoning hearings, lawsuits, and deals.

A 1979 San Jose State University study ranked Ruffo as one of the 10 most powerful people in San Jose. In 1997, he was inducted into the Santa Clara County Sports Hall of Fame.

Ruffo filed a lawsuit in 1998 against San Jose's new leaders to stop them from using redevelopment funds to build a new city hall. In 2001, he won a state appeals court ruling on the case.

He died in San Jose, California on February 10, 2003. He was remembered as a "Beloved husband of Marianne Ruffo of San Jose."

Political offices
Preceded by Ernest E. Renzel	Mayor of San Jose; 1946–1948	Succeeded by Fred Watson
