= George Starbird =

American politician

52nd Mayor of San Jose
- In office 1954–1956
- Preceded by: Parker Hathaway
- Succeeded by: Robert Doerr

Personal details
- Born: November 26, 1908 San Jose, California, U.S.
- Died: November 11, 1994 (aged 85) Milpitas, California, U.S.
- Education: Stanford University

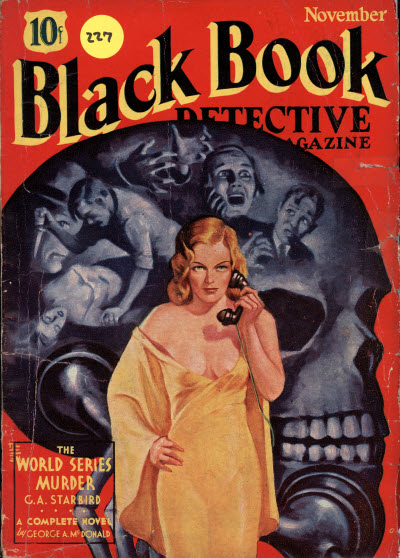
Starbird's "The World Series Murder" was the cover story in the November 1934 issue of Black Book Detective.

George Albert Starbird (November 26, 1908 – November 11, 1994) was an American politician and author. He served as mayor of San Jose, California from 1954 to 1956, and served on its City Council before and after his term as mayor (1950 to 1962).

== Life and career ==
Starbird was born on November 26, 1908, in San Jose, California. He attended Stanford University and graduated in 1932 with a degree in English. He married Carolyn Hall Starbird, whom he met at Stanford, on February 22, 1934. They had two sons, George Anthony Starbird and Timothy Starbird, and two daughters, Susan Irene Starbird and Carolyn Jane Starbird. George Starbird died on November 11, 1994, in Milpitas, California.

Starbird was Mayor of San Jose during its peak growth period. One of his accomplishments was the San José–Santa Clara Regional Wastewater Facility.

Starbird wrote The New Metropolis, a book on San Jose history published in 1972. In the 1930s, he published more than a dozen mystery stories in pulp detective magazines such as Black Book Detective and Federal Agent; some stories appeared under his Val Masterson pseudonym.

== Publications ==
- Starbird, George; The New Metropolis; San Jose, California: The Rosecrucian Press; 1972.

Political offices
Preceded by Parker Hathaway	Mayor of San Jose; 1954–1956	Succeeded by Robert Doerr
