= Ron James (mayor) =

American politician (1928–2025)

Mayor of San Jose, California
- In office 1967–1971
- Preceded by: Joseph L. Pace
- Succeeded by: Norman Mineta

Personal details
- Born: Ronald Raymond James; June 11, 1928
- Died: January 5, 2025 (aged 96) San Jose, California, U.S.

Ronald Raymond James (June 11, 1928 – January 5, 2025) was an American politician and businessman. James, who was elected Mayor of San Jose, California in 1967, served as the city's first popularly elected mayor from 1967 until 1971. He retired from office in 1971 after one term and was succeeded by then-San Jose Vice Mayor Norm Mineta.

In 1970, Mayor James submitted a letter addressed to a future mayor, which was placed in a time capsule buried at San Jose's former main library on West San Carlos Street on May 14, 1970. Other artifacts included with James's letter included a copy of the San Jose city charter, a city council agenda from 1969, newspaper clippings, and a taped radio interview with city librarian Geraldine Nurney, which was recorded at the library's dedication in April 1970. James had been told that the time capsule would remain buried for about 100 years, so he assumed he wouldn't live to see it reopened. However, the old main library was demolished in 2011, which allowed for the capsule's recovery. The time capsule was opened in September 2013 and James's letter was reprinted in its entirety in the San Jose Mercury News. James remarked at the ceremony, "They told me it was going to be opened in 100 years or longer...I was pleasantly surprised that the Mercury News printed the letter verbatim so people could read it. Now, I'm just happy to still be here."

James died in San Jose on January 5, 2025, at the age of 96.
