= Charles J. Martin (California politician) =

French-born American politician (1839–1912)

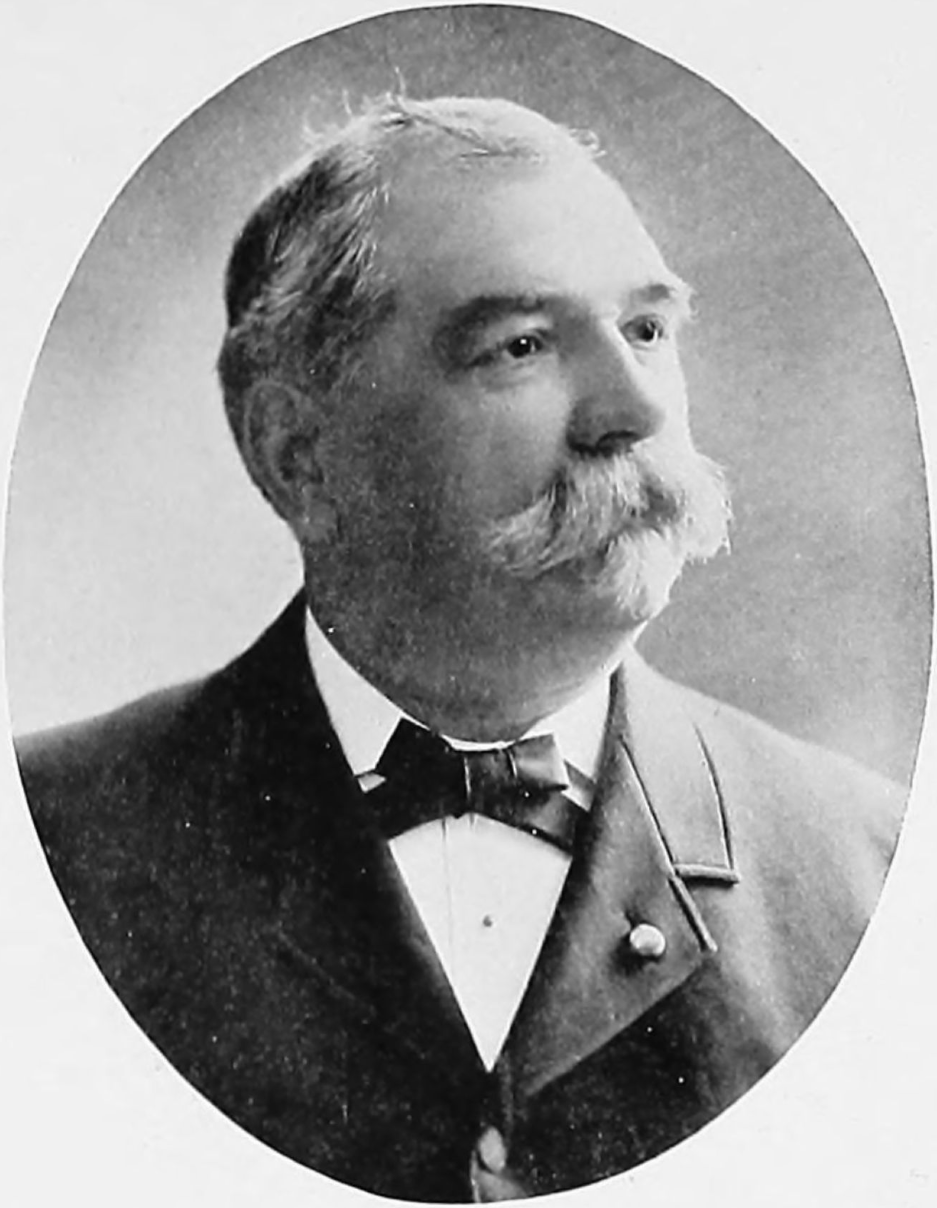

20th Mayor of San Jose, California
- In office 1882–1884
- Preceded by: Bernard D. Murphy
- Succeeded by: Campbell Thompson Settle

27th Mayor of San Jose, California
- In office 1898–1902
- Preceded by: Valentine Koch
- Succeeded by: George D. Worswick

Personal details
- Born: Charles John Martin; February 11, 1839 France
- Died: April 1, 1912 (aged 73) San Jose, California, U.S.
- Resting place: Oak Hill Memorial Park, San Jose, California, U.S.
- Party: Democrat (1880s–1900); Republican (1900–)
- Spouse(s): Mary Lucretia "Mollie" Delzelle (m. 1868–1881, her death); Elizabeth Hewlett (m. 1884–1905, her death); Cora H. Graham (m. 1909–1911, div.)
- Children: 4
- Occupation: Politician, businessman, merchant

Charles John "C.J." Martin (February 11, 1839 – April 1, 1912) was a French-born American politician, businessman, and merchant. He served two terms as the mayor of San Jose, California.

== Early life and family ==
Charles John Martin was born on February 11, 1839, in France. He moved to San Jose, California as a child.

Martin was married three times. His first marriage was in 1868 to Mary "Mollie" Lucretia Delzell, and together they had four children. Delzell died at a young age on August 4, 1880. His second marriage was in 1884 to Elizabeth Hewlett (formerly married to Hayes) of Bristol, England, who died in January 1905. Martin's third marriage was to Cora H. Cody (née Graham) of Los Angeles, from 1909 until 1911 and ending in divorce.

== Career ==
Martin owned a dry goods business called "The Bee Hive" at the corner of First and San Fernando Streets in downtown San Jose. He also owned the Bristol Hotel (also known as the Martin Building) on South Second Street in San Jose.

Martin served two terms as the mayor of San Jose, California: the first was from 1882 until 1884, and the second from 1898 until 1902.

On May 19, 1902, George D. Worswick was elected as mayor of San Jose, defeating Adolph Greeninger by a narrow margin, and the successor of Martin. Martin had backed Greeninger, as did local businessman Johnny McKenzie. Martin and some from his cabinet refused to leave the mayors office, claiming issues with "certification". In June 1902, Martin was physically dragged by police from the office along with some of his staff, they were referred to as the "McKenzie gang".

Martin was a member of the Democratic Party, however in 1900 he supported the election of Republican President William McKinley and appeared as a member of the Republican Party after McKinley won the election. In 1906, he served as a Republican delegate to the California State Convention.

Martin and local merchant O.A. Hale (1852–1907) contributed towards the 1903 establishment of the Main San José Carnegie Library.

== Death ==
Martin died on April 1, 1912, in San Jose, and was buried at Oak Hill Memorial Park. At the time of his death he was wealthy, and was recently divorced from his third wife.

== See also ==
- Mayor of San Jose, California

Political offices
Preceded by Bernard D. Murphy	Mayor of San Jose, California; 1882–1884	Succeeded by Campbell Thompson Settle
Preceded by Valentine Koch	Mayor of San Jose, California; 1898–1902	Succeeded by George D. Worswick
