= Ernie Renzel =

American politician

Mayor of San Jose, California
- In office 1945–1946
- Preceded by: Earl Campbell
- Succeeded by: Albert J. Ruffo

Personal details
- Born: Ernest Henry Renzel Jr; August 7, 1907
- Died: September 15, 2007 (aged 100) San Jose, California, U.S.
- Spouses: Edwina Ewing (m. 1929; div. 1931) Emily Hillebrand (m. 1935)
- Education: Stanford University

Ernest Henry Renzel Jr. (August 7, 1907 – September 15, 2007), commonly known as Ernie Renzel, was an American politician who served as the mayor of San Jose, California, from 1945 until 1946. He was known as the "Father of the San Jose International Airport" for his work in establishing a major airport in the city.

== Early life ==
Ernest Henry Renzel Jr. was born on August 7, 1907, as a third-generation resident of San Jose, California. His grandfather, Conrad Renzel, was a San Jose baker who gradually expanded his South First Street bakery into a grocery store in the 1860s. Renzel's father, E.H. Renzel Sr., further expanded the family business to a wholesale grocery distributor by the 1880s. Renzel Sr. would become vice president and manager of the family grocery firm, Keystone Co., by the turn of the 20th century.

Renzel was active in leadership activities while enrolled at San Jose High School. He served as student body president of the high school, joined the Rotary Club and held a perfect attendance record. Renzel was also an accomplished athlete during his early years and excelled at basketball, swimming and tennis. Renzel went on to study economics at Stanford University following his graduation from high school. He graduated from Stanford in 1929 and remained with the family grocery business after completing his degree at Stanford.

Renzel held a wide range of interests throughout his life including economics, athletics and classical Greek philosophy.

He married Edwina Ewing in Carmel-by-the-Sea in May 1929. They were divorced in March 1931. He then married Emily Hillebrand in Reno, Nevada on November 22, 1935. They lived together until her death in 1999. They had five children.

On September 23, 2010, the residence where they resided, now recognized as the Ernest & Emily Renzel House, was listed on the National Register of Historic Places.

== San Jose Mineta International Airport ==
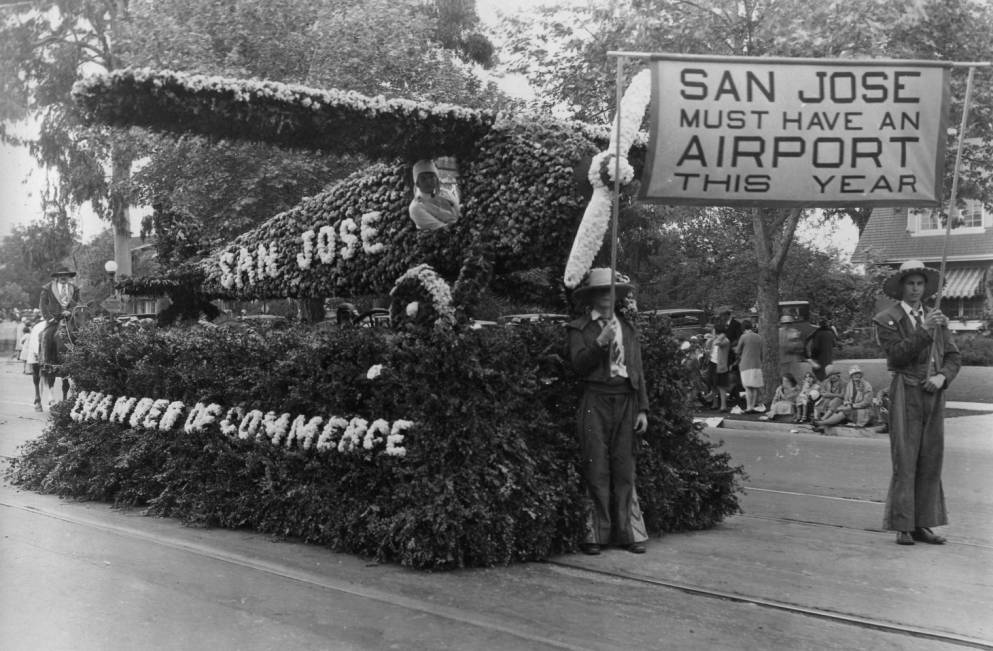
San Jose Must Have An Airport – 1929

Renzel became an important advocate for the establishment and development of a new airport to serve San Jose and the surrounding region. He personally scouted land for his project. In 1939, Renzel led a group that negotiated an option to buy 483 acres (195 ha) of the Stockton Ranch from the Crocker family, to be the site of San Jose's airport. Renzel led the effort to pass a city bond measure to pay for the land in 1940, which passed, in order to pay for the land acquisition. In 1945, test pilot James M. Nissen and two partners leased about 16 acres (6.5 ha) of this land to build a runway, hangar and office building for a flight school. When the city of San Jose decided to develop a municipal airport, Nissen sold his share of the aviation business and became San Jose's first airport manager. In 1949, the San Jose Municipal Airport was inaugurated. Renzel presided over the civic celebration commemorating the first airline flight. Renzel and Nissen were instrumental in the development of San Jose Municipal Airport over the next few decades, culminating with the 1965 opening of what later became Terminal C.

Renzel remained actively involved in the airport, even after its expansion from a municipal airport into San Jose International Airport. He served as airport commissioner from 1969 until 1977. He oversaw much of the expansion of the airport during his tenure as commissioner.

Renzel was honored for his work in establishing Norman Y. Mineta San Jose International Airport with a bust of his image, which was dedicated in Terminal C in 1994. In 2004, the airport's airfield, which includes all of the airport's taxiways and runways, were renamed in his honor as the "Ernest Renzel Field."

== Political career ==
Renzel was introduced to city politics during World War II. According to the San Jose Mercury News, Charlie Bigley, a San Josean taxi operator, was a major political boss in San Jose in the years before and during World War II. Bigley was consistently able to get a majority of his supporters elected to the San Jose City Council. However, Bigley's grip on power began to slip during the war. Two incumbent city council members left the city government in order to enlist in the U.S. military during World War II. Their departure left six of the seven city council seats open during the 1944 San Jose municipal election.

Bigley's political foes joined forces to form a group called the Progress Committee to counteract Bigley's influence in the upcoming election. The committee's campaign manager, lawyer Harvey Miller, convinced Ernie Renzel, as well as Albert J. Ruffo and four other important San Josean figures, to run as an anti-Bigley ticket.

The Progress Committee succeeded. Ernie Renzel was elected in 1944 and was selected as president of the San Jose city council in 1945. Renzel also assumed the then-unofficial title of Mayor of San Jose simultaneously. He remained mayor until 1946, when he was succeeded by Al Ruffo.

Renzel remained in the city council for just one term in office. He spent the rest of his career as a "low-profile" citizen of influence in the larger San Jose community. Renzel explained why he chose this lower profile career in a 1980 interview, "Sometimes you can do more from the outside than the inside."

His influence and works extended beyond San Jose City Hall or San Jose International Airport. For example, Renzel used his influence to purchase a property in the 1960s for the San Jose Historical Landmarks Commission's historical museum.

He was actively involved in several San Jose metropolitan area and Santa Clara County nonprofit groups throughout his lifetime. He served on the board of directors for such organizations as the San Jose Hospital, the Santa Clara County Civil Grand Jury and the Santa Clara County Housing Board.

== Death ==
Ernie Renzel celebrated his 100th birthday in August 2007. He died on September 15, 2007, at his home in San Jose.

Political offices
Preceded by Earl Campbell	Mayor of San Jose; 1945 - 1946	Succeeded by Albert J. Ruffo
