= Mineta Transportation Institute =

Research institute in San Jose, California, US

- Formation: 1991; 35 years ago
- Founder: Norman Y. Mineta
- Coordinates: 37.34098°N 121.88944°W
- Owner: San Jose State University
- Executive Director: Karen Philbrick
- Website: transweb.sjsu.edu

The Mineta Transportation Institute is a research institute focusing on the issues related to intermodal surface transportation in the United States. Although part of San Jose State University's Lucas Graduate School of Business in San Jose, California, the headquarters is located at 210 N 4th Street, San Jose and is currently directed by Karen Philbrick. It is named after its founder Norman Mineta, who was the 14th United States Secretary of Transportation.

== History ==
It was established by Congress in 1991 as part of the Intermodal Surface Transportation Efficiency Act.

== Research ==
MTI has adopted the following areas of emphasis:

- Bicycle and pedestrian issues
- Financing public and private sector transportation improvements
- Intermodal connectivity and integration
- Safety and security of transportation systems
- Sustainability of transportation systems
- Transportation / land use / environment
- Transportation planning and policy development
