= Fred Doerr =

American politician (1874–1960)

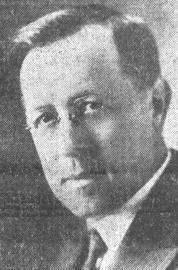
Doerr, circa 1934

Frederick Doerr (September 16, 1874 – June 29, 1960) was an American politician who served as the 39th Mayor of San Jose, California, from 1928 to 1930. He was also a member of the San Jose City Council.

Doerr was born in San Jose, the son of German emigrants Charles Doerr and Minna Bertelsman. His son, Robert Doerr, later served as the city's mayor from 1956 until 1958.

Political offices
| Preceded by Dan W. Gray | Mayor of San Jose, California; 1928–1930 | Succeeded by W. L. Biebrach |
