= Rangapriya (Priya) Kannan =

Indian-American academic administrator and professor

Dean of the Lucas College and Graduate School of Business
- Incumbent
- Assumed office August 1, 2023
- Preceded by: Dan Moshavi

Personal details
- Education: University of Mumbai (BComm); Tata Institute of Social Sciences (MA); San Jose State University (MS); University of California Los Angeles (PhD)

Rangapriya “Priya” Kannan is an Indian-American academic administrator and professor currently serving as the Dean of the San Jose State University Lucas College and Graduate School of Business, beginning on August 1, 2023. She is the first woman to lead the Lucas College and Graduate School of Business as dean. She joined SJSU from the University of San Diego, where she was the associate dean of faculty and accreditation and a professor of strategic management, innovation, and entrepreneurship.

== Early life and education ==
Kannan was born in India and completed her undergraduate studies at the University of Bombay (currently the University of Mumbai), where she received a Bachelor of Commerce degree. She earned a master's degree in Personnel Management & Industrial Relations from Tata Institute of Social Sciences in India and is a graduate of the Cost and Works Accountants Society in India. Upon moving to the United States, she earned a master's degree in Industrial/Organizational Psychology from San Jose State University. She was a Sally Casanova Scholar. Kannan completed her PhD from the UCLA Anderson School of Management.

== Career ==
Kannan served as a professor University of San Diego. She also served as a research professor of entrepreneurship at the University of Exeter Business School.

Kannan's achievements include the Clarence L. Steber Professorship at the University of San Diego, being named as one of San Diego Businesswomen of the Year in 2020, and one of the SD 500 San Diego Most Influential Business Leaders in 2021 and 2022.

She served as a visiting research fellow at the Cambridge Judge Business School.

On August 1, 2023, Kannan was appointed as the Dean of the San Jose State University Lucas College and Graduate School of Business.

== Research ==
Kannan has published papers in several outlets related to strategy and innovation. She has taught courses in Strategic Management and Innovation & Entrepreneurship.

=== Selected publications ===
- Kannan-Narasimhan, R.; Lawrence, B. S. (2012). "Behavioral integrity: How leader referents and trust matter to workplace outcomes". Journal of Business Ethics. 111 (2): 165–178. doi:10.1007/s10551-011-1199-9.
- Flamholtz, E.; Kannan-Narasimhan, R. (2005). "Differential impact of cultural elements on financial performance". European Management Journal. 23 (1): 50–64. doi:10.1016/j.emj.2004.12.010.
