= Robert Doerr =

American politician and educator

53rd Mayor of San Jose, California
- In office 1956–1958
- Preceded by: George Starbird
- Succeeded by: Louis Solari

Personal details
- Born: Robert Charles Doerr; October 27, 1914 San Jose, California, U.S.
- Died: December 5, 2013 (aged 99)
- Party: Democratic
- Profession: Politician and educator

Robert Charles Doerr (October 27, 1914 – December 5, 2013) was an American politician and educator. He served as the 53rd Mayor of San Jose, California, from 1956 to 1958. Doerr was the city's oldest living mayor at the time of his death in December 2013.

Doerr's grandfather Charles served on the San Jose City Council. His father, Fred Doerr, who was also a member of the city council, also served as the mayor of San Jose from 1928 until 1930. Robert Doerr lived with his family at a home at Fifth and William Streets during the 1930s. He earned a bachelor's degree from San Jose State University.

In 1950, Doerr and Alden Campen, a city landowner and World War II veteran, ran together as candidates for the San Jose City Council. The two men promised that the city would acquire the San Jose Water Company if elected. The San Jose Water Company countered Campen's and Doerr's campaigns by running a series of negative ads which portrayed them as socialists. Campen lost the election, but Doerr was elected to the council.

Doerr served on the city council during the 1950s. During the early part of the decade, Doerr proposed a new tax on the city's parochial schools. The tax proposal, which was opposed by the city's Catholic community, was defeated following an effort led by John P. McEnery, the father of a future San Jose mayor, Tom McEnery.

Doerr supported the policies of city manager, A. P. Hamann, who spearheaded much of the city's urban expansion during the 1950s and 1960s. Hamann also had San Jose City Hall moved to a new location outside Downtown San Jose in 1958.

Doerr served one term as Mayor of San Jose from 1956 to 1958. At that time, the Mayor was chosen from members of the city council, rather than through a direct election. As mayor (and a World War II veteran), Doerr pushed for closer ties between the city and Japan. He established a sister city relationship between San Jose and Okayama. He traveled to Okayama to mark the occasion, where he delivered a speech in Japanese from memory. The city of San Jose also celebrated its centennial in 1957 during his tenure as mayor.

Doerr resided at the Atrium senior home in South San Jose during his later life. He died on December 5, 2013, at the age of 99.

Political offices
Preceded by Parker Hathaway	Mayor of San Jose, California; 1956–1958	Succeeded by Louis Solari
