= Ernest & Emily Renzel House =

Historic house in California, United States

- U.S. National Register of Historic Places
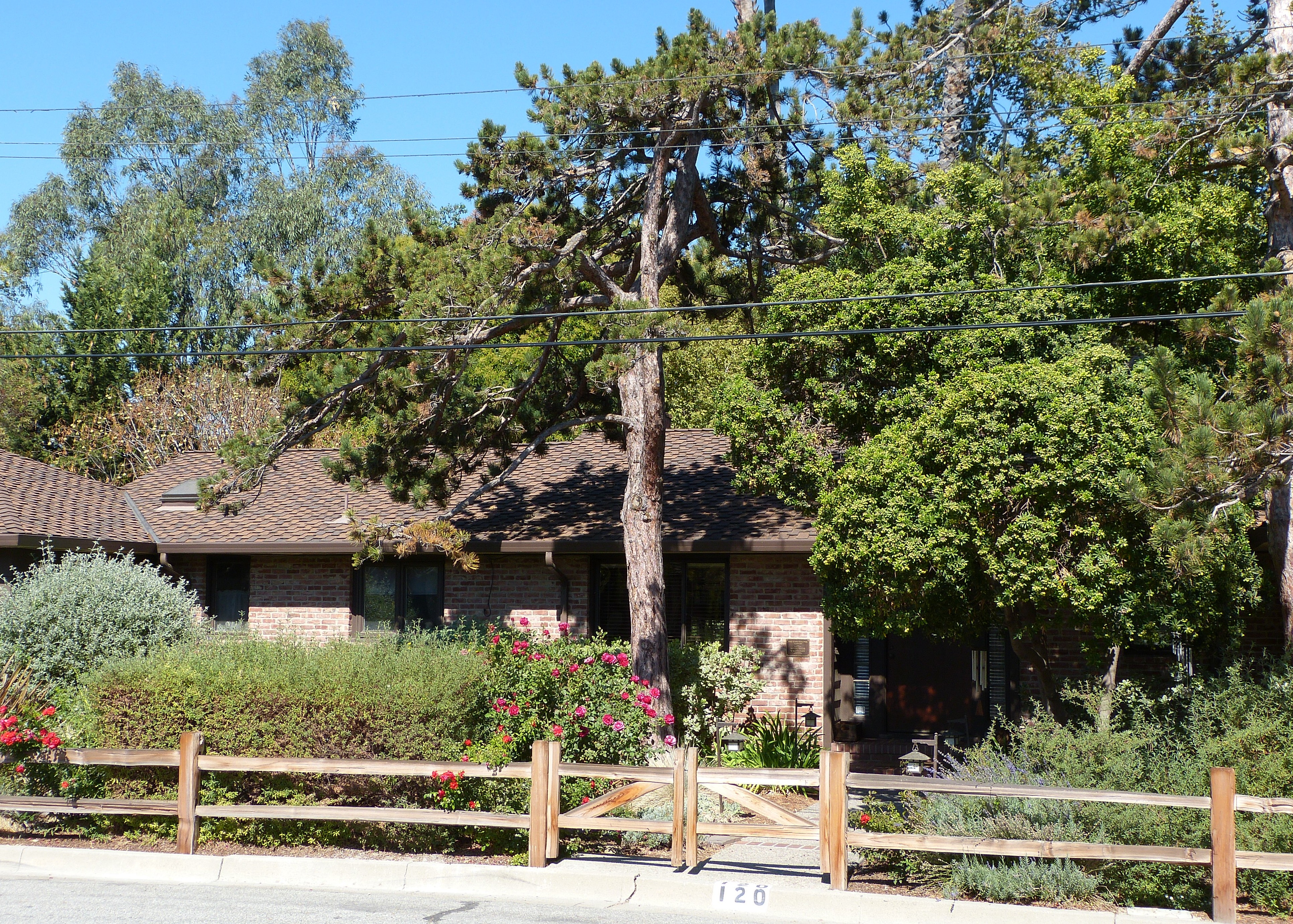
- Ernest and Emily Renzel House in 2012

- Location within San Jose, California
- Location: 120 Arroyo Way, San Jose, California, US
- Coordinates: 37°20′32″N 121°52′18″W
- Area: 4,700 square feet (440 m^{2})
- Built: 1939
- Built by: Gibson & Wheeler Co.
- Architect: Chester Root
- Architectural style: Ranch style
- NRHP reference No.: 10000773
- Added to NRHP: September 23, 2010

The Ernest & Emily Renzel House is a historic residence in San Jose, California. The house was the residence of San Jose mayor Ernie Renzel, and for being one of the first Ranch style homes built in the Naglee Park conservation area. It was placed on the National Register of Historic Places on September 23, 2010.

== History ==
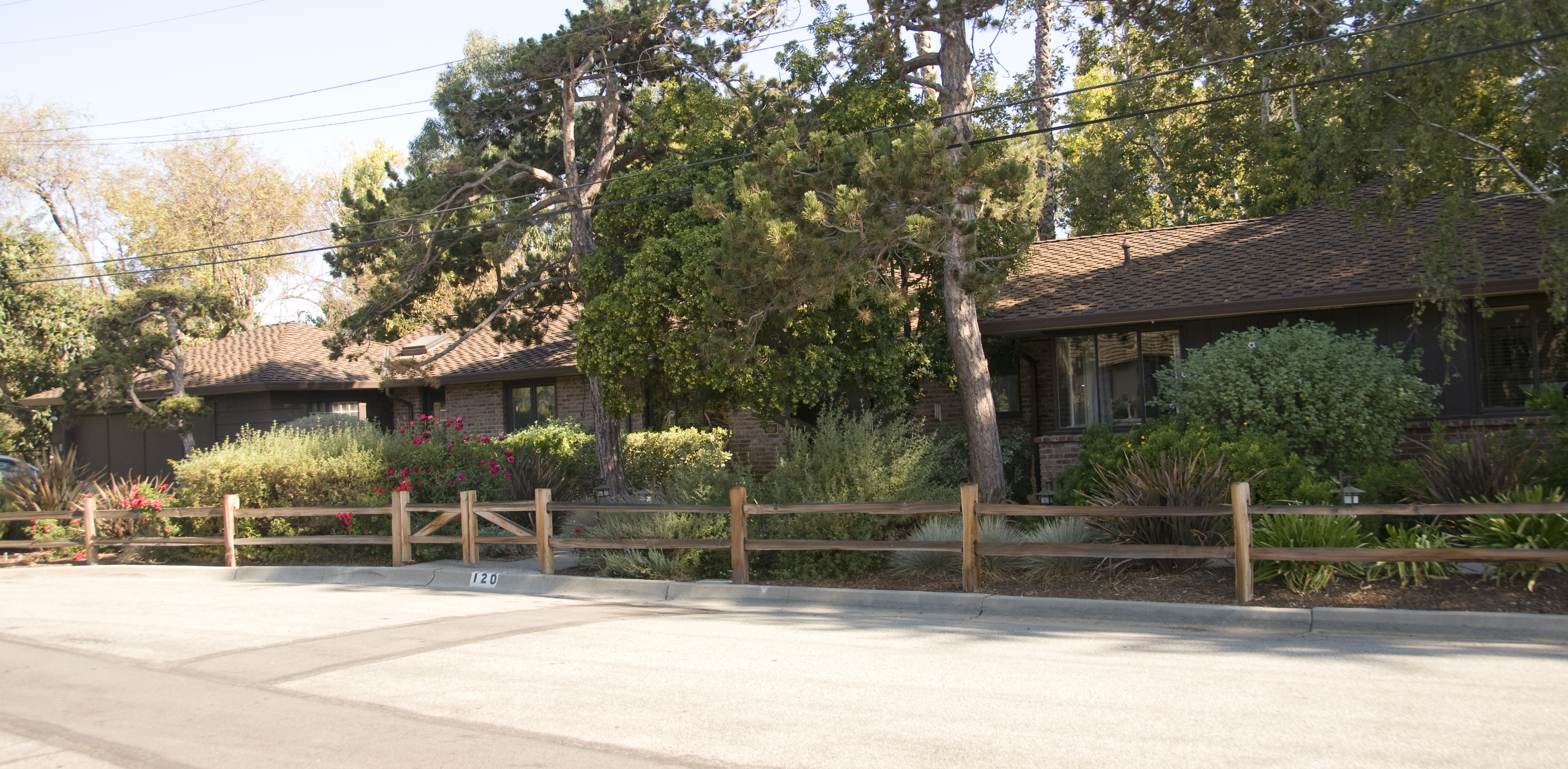
The Renzel House in San Jose

In July 1936, Charles and Mary Derby sold about 0.6667 acres (0.2698 ha) of his subdivision to San Jose mayor Ernest Renzel (1907– 2007). In 1939, Renzel commissioned local architect Chester Root to design and Gibson & Wheeler Co., to build a Ranch style single family home that stands on the property. Today, it is known as The Ernest & Emily Renzel House.

The house is set on the hillside, located along Arroyo Way, in a small 1930s residential area between Coyote Creek and Naglee Park in San Jose. Renzel and his wife Emily and their children lived in the house.

=== Design ===
Thestructure consists of a single-story Ranch style residence at the front and a two-story addition towards the rear. The building has a blend of brick and wood siding, incorporating early Ranch style elements, like Modernist steel corner windows, and horizontal dimensions beneath the eaves. Designed by Chester Root, this residence blends Modern architecture and traditional materials. The property sits within a residential neighborhood, surrounded by mature trees and well-established landscaping.

An addition in 1949, was done by Kress & Gibson. The expansion included a two-story layout that includes two large brick chimneys. Spanning 4,700 square feet (440 m^{2}), the property has a partial basement, garage, and enclosed patio.

== Designation ==
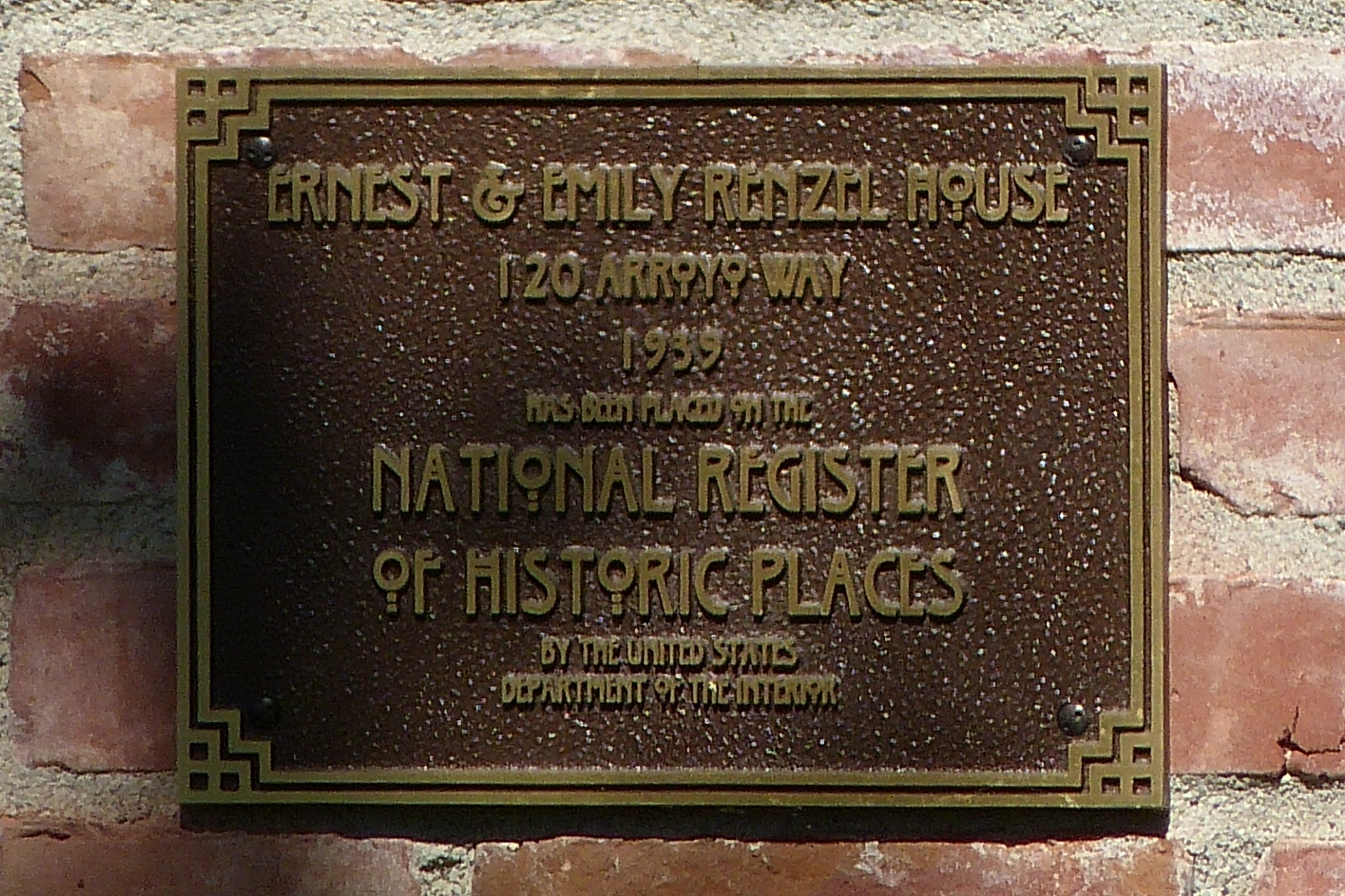
Plaque at Ernest and Emily Renzel House in 2012

The house was nominated by the State Historical Resources Commission and was placed on the National Register of Historic Places in September, 2010. The home is an early example of Ranch style architecture in the area. The architecture blended traditional ranch-style architecture with early modern period materials to fit the rustic setting of the estate. The period of significance is from 1926 to 1949. The house was locally designated as a local landmark prior to being placed on the National Register of Historic Places on September 23, 2010.

== See also ==
- National Register of Historic Places listings in Santa Clara County, California
- Timeline of San Jose, California
