= O. H. Allen =

American politician

O. H. Allen was an American politician, judge, and lawyer. He was the mayor of San Jose, California from 1854 to 1855. Allen was a member of the Know Nothing Party.

== See also ==
- Mayor of San Jose, California
