= Flag of San Jose, California =

City of San Jose
- Proportion: 3:5
- Adopted: June 5, 1984
- Design: A horizontal triband of gold (top), white (middle), and blue (bottom), with the Seal of San Jose in the center

The current flag of San Jose, California, features a triband of gold on top, white in the middle, and blue on the bottom with the city's official seal in the center. It has been the official flag since 1984.

== Design and symbolism ==
The blue and gold stripes may symbolize the state of California, as they are the state's official colors. The seal of the flag is one unit in diameter, with the entire flag having a 3 unit by 5 unit proportion.

== Seal ==
The seal is a black-outlined gold ring with "CITY OF SAN JOSÉ" and "CALIFORNIA" in black block letters, separated by black six-pointed stars. The white space enclosed within the ring consists of a gold wheat sheaf and grapevines tied with a golden bow. The wheat and grapevines symbolize the area's agricultural products, the largest industry in the area prior to the shift towards technological products. Attached below the seal is an oval bearing the text "FOUNDED 1777". The seal was officially adopted on September 9, 1850.

== History ==
=== First flag ===
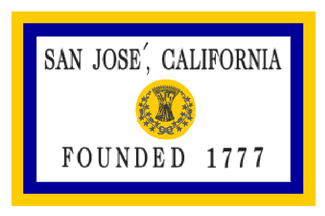
First flag, used from 1969 to 1984

The first flag was designed by city historian Clyde Arbuckle. The flag was a white field with a gold and blue border, with the gold surrounding the blue, and a white border on the very outside of the flag. In the middle of the flag is the city's seal. The text "SAN JOSE’ CALIFORNIA" is above the seal and "FOUNDED 1777" is below. Both of these are in black font. The proportions were 3 by 4.5, and was officially adopted on June 2, 1969.

=== Second flag ===
The second flag saw the removal of the borders and big text, replacing the borders with a triband with the same color scheme and the text was made smaller to surround the seal. This flag was made by both the rules committee and San Jose's Historic Landmark Commission, at the request of the San Jose City Council. The flag's proportions were also increased to 3 by 5. The flag ranked 78th out of 150 American city flags in a 2004 North American Vexillological Association survey.

A redesign effort in 2016 garnered press coverage in The Mercury News and KPIX-TV, but nothing came of it, with a city spokesman saying it was not one of the city's priorities.

== Usage ==
San Jose's official flag policy mandates that the flag be flown at San Jose City Hall, the police administration building, San Jose Civic, San Jose International Airport, and all fire and police department facilities, in addition to city council chambers and the mayor's office. The San Jose Earthquakes' current away jersey is influenced by the city's flag, featuring the same gold-white-blue triband.

=== Gallery ===
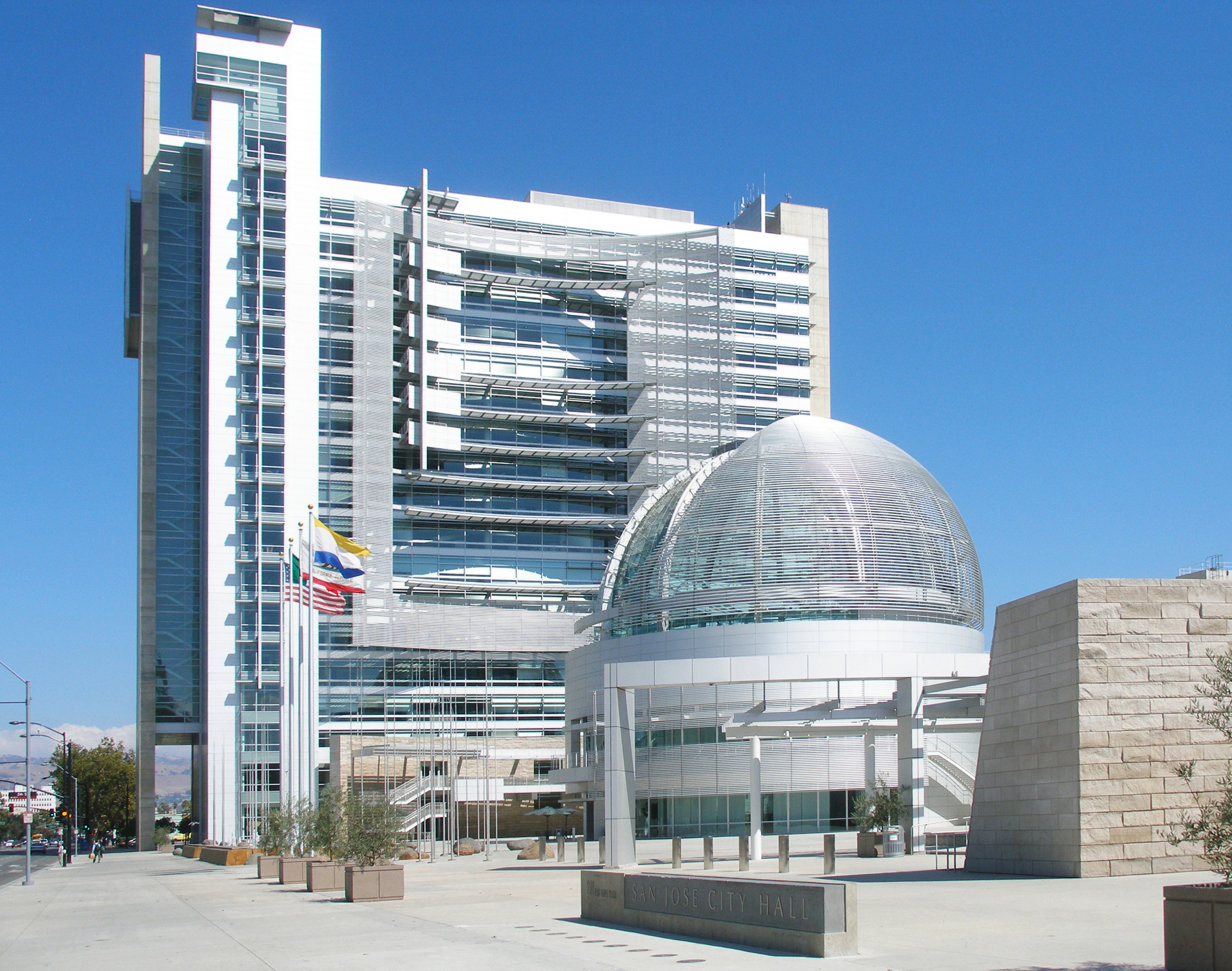
San Jose City Hall, note the city flag flying left of the rotunda

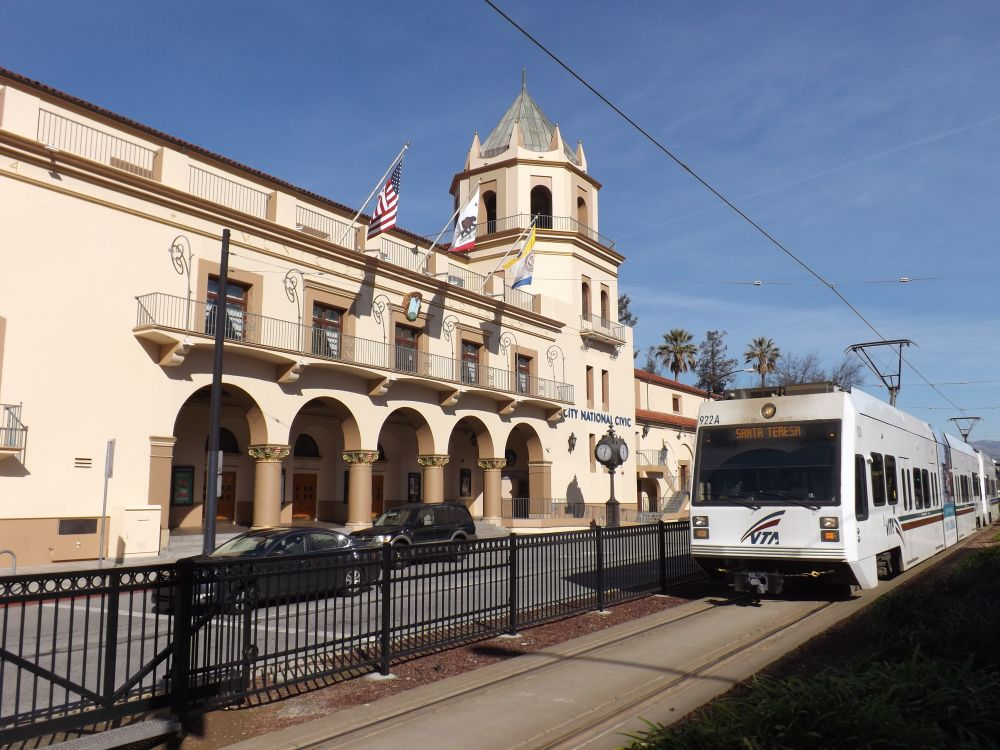
Flag flying alongside the Flag of the United States and the Flag of California at the Civic

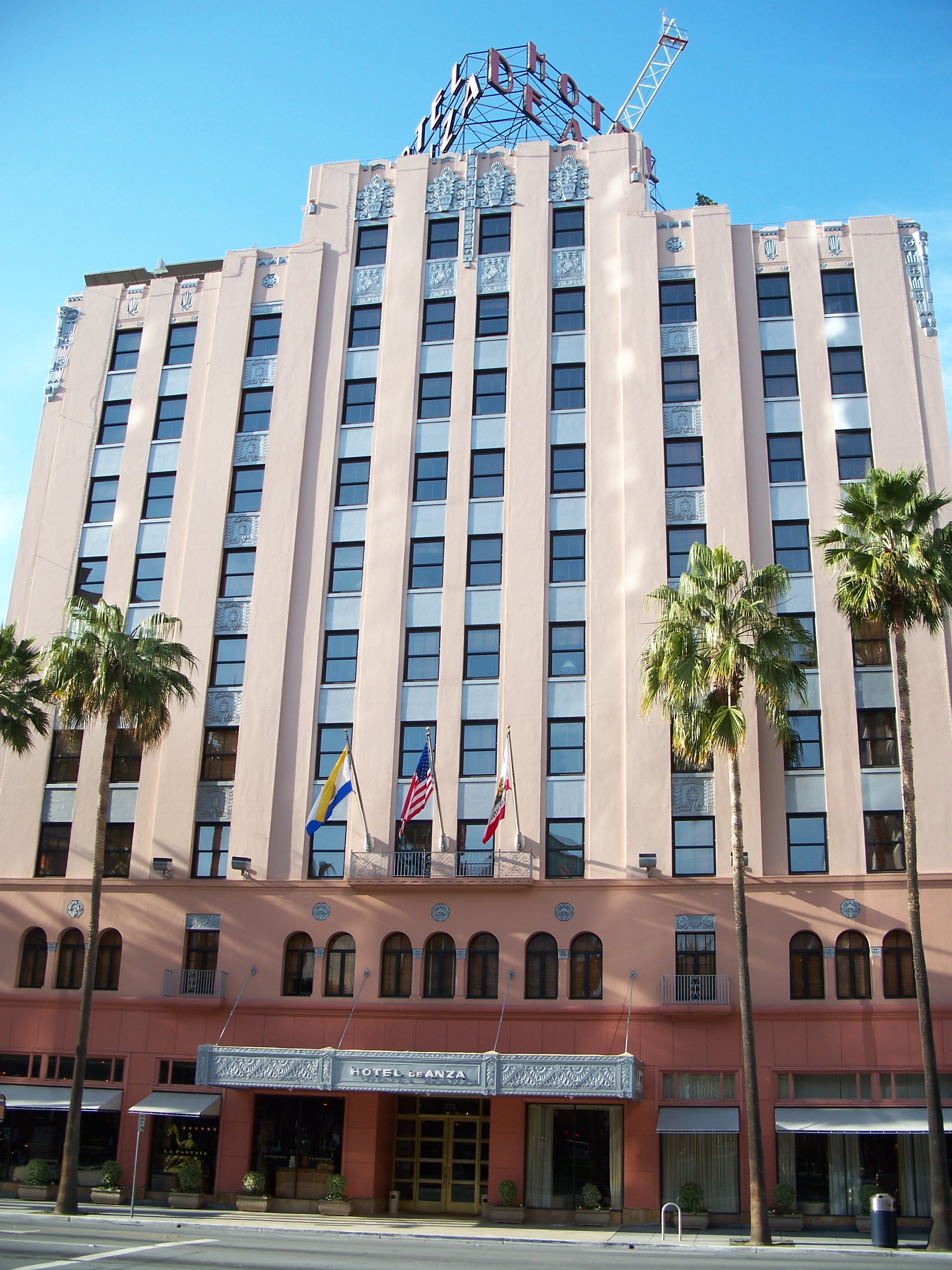
The Hotel De Anza, with the city flag flying at the leftmost flagpole
