= Joseph L. Pace =

American physician and politician

Joseph Leon Pace

57th Mayor of San Jose
- In office 1964–1965
- Preceded by: Robert Welch
- Succeeded by: Ron James

Councilmember of San Jose
- In office 1963–1967

Personal details
- Born: May 5, 1917 Salt Lake City, Utah, US
- Died: May 21, 2000 (aged 83) Salt Lake City, Utah, US
- Resting place: Springville, Utah, US
- Spouse: Pauline Clyde
- Children: 7
- Education: Brigham Young University
- Alma mater: University of Chicago School of Medicine

Military service
- Branch/service: United States Navy
- Years of service: 1944-1946

Joseph Leon Pace (May 5, 1917 - May 21, 2000) was an American physician and politician who served as the Mayor of San Jose, California from 1964 to 1965 and on its City Council before and after his term as mayor from 1963 to 1967.

Pace was born in Salt Lake City and attended Brigham Young University, the University of Chicago School of Medicine, and the School of Aviation Medicine. Shortly after graduation, he joined the United States Navy and served as a flight surgeon during World War II in the South Pacific on the USS Monterey.

Upon discharge from military service, he relocated to San Jose, California, where he established a medical practice. From 1963-1967 he was a Councilmember for the city and held the title of Mayor from 1964-1965. He was the last Mayor to have the title as a ceremonial title, as Mayors following him were all elected at large. Following an unsuccessful re-election for City Council campaigns as a Republican for State Controller and Congress he suspended further political campaigning. As an active member of The Church of Jesus Christ of Latter-day Saints, he worked on numerous humanitarian relief medical missions on several continents throughout his later years.

One of Pace's children, Malcolm, contracted HIV and eventually died of complications with AIDS on January 13th, 1989. Pace was interviewed for an episode of The AIDS Quarterly that his son Malcolm was featured in as he was dying. Pace's conservative Mormon beliefs made it difficult to accept his son's homosexuality and said "I love my son, I love my religious beliefs. They don't mix. That's called a conflict, when there's no logical solution to your problem. That's what I've had for many years now, a disaster.". Malcolm on his death bed said that the most important thing to him was his father's approval. Pace recognized that he failed in this regard, saying "He searched for my approval for years and years and years and I didn't give it to him,. I'm not saying it's right, but it's the way it was.... I did the best I could. At times it wasn't very good.". Pace had always been afraid that Malcolm would get AIDS, and would drive around gay bathhouses trying to find his son's car. Malcolm's original obituary had stated that he died from cancer, but his father changed it at the last minute to say that he died from AIDS.
