= Lucas College and Graduate School of Business =

Coordinates: 37.336736°N 121.878853°W

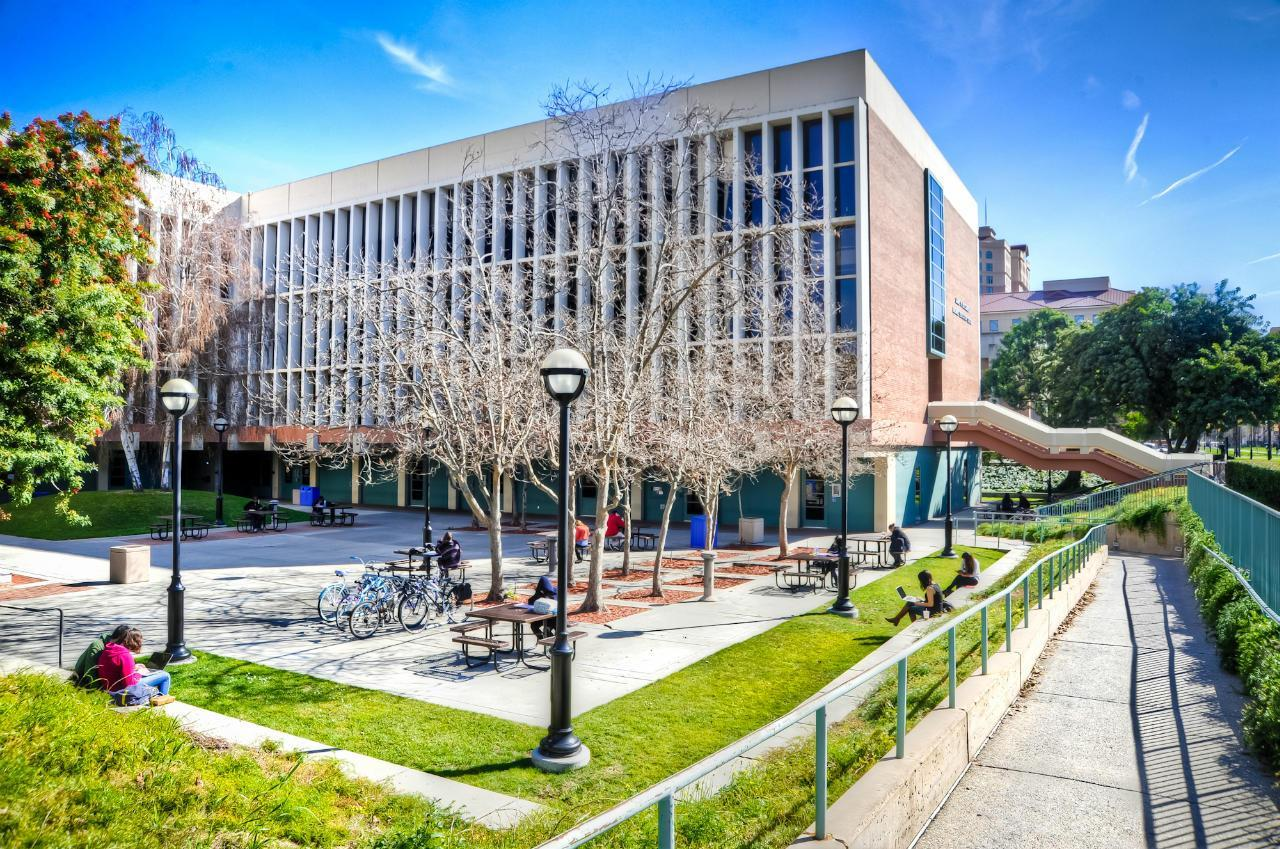
- Boccardo Business Complex
- Former names: Department of Commerce (1928–1950); Business Division (1950-c.1966); School of Business (c.1966-2006)
- Type: Public
- Established: 1928
- Founder: Elmer H. Staffelbach
- Parent institution: San José State University
- Endowment: $99.9 million parent institution
- Dean: Rangapriya (Priya) Kannan
- Faculty: 220 (Fall 2022)
- Students: 7,295 (Fall 2025)
- Undergraduates: 6,741 (Fall 2025)
- Postgraduates: 554 (Fall 2025)
- Location: San Jose, California, USA
- Website: www.sjsu.edu/cob
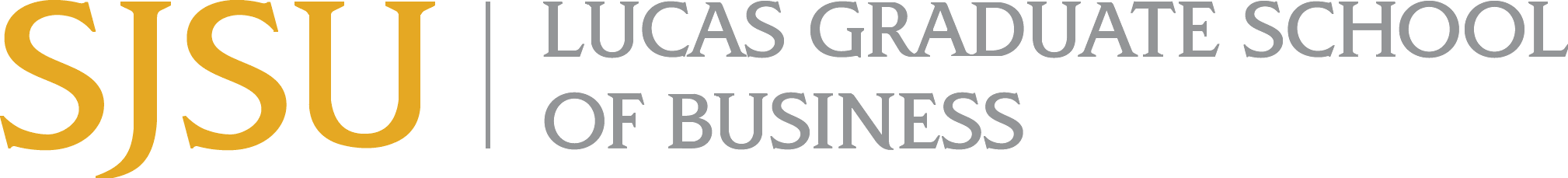

The Lucas College and Graduate School of Business is one of San Jose State University's schools and colleges. Lucas College is the largest Business school in Silicon Valley with firms in the area employing more of its graduates than from any other university in the United States. 80% of graduates are employed in the Valley. In 2025, Poets&Quants For Undergrads recognized the school as the #1 ranked public undergraduate business school within the California State University (CSU) system and a top 100 undergraduate business program in the nation. In 2010, the school appeared in Forbes' ranking of the top 20 "Colleges that will make you rich".

== History ==
The college was founded as the Department of Commerce in 1928, with the mission statement of "[making] this department one which will attract not only those who especially desire business proficiency as a vocational objective but also teachers who have been notably lacking in clerical accuracy and are thereby handicapped when confronted with blanks and schedules for official data". The department was organized by four teachers, led by Elmer H. Staffelbach, and only two areas of study were offered, secretarial training and accountancy.

By 1950, the Department of Commerce had grown to a staff of 40 that supported 7 majors and had a student body of 1,528, nearly a fifth of the entire student body.

The school became accredited by the Association to Advance Collegiate Schools of Business in 1967.

In 2006, the school was renamed in honor of Donald Lucas and his wife Sally Lucas. Donald graduated with a Bachelor of Science degree in Marketing in 1957. Sally graduated with a Bachelor of Arts in Education degree in 1959. Donald created the Lucas Dealership Group and the Lucas Trust Ventures, which focused in the business of automobiles and real estate, respectively. Both companies have several locations throughout the San Francisco Bay Area. The college was named after the couple for their generous donation, history of philanthropy, and successful careers in Business and Education.

== Academics ==
The Lucas College and Graduate School of Business serves over 6,000 students (5,923 undergraduate and 405 graduate students), consists of six departments and offers 29 types of degrees (13 undergraduate disciplines, 5 graduate disciplines, 2 academic minors, and 9 academic certificates).

Departments and Concentrations:

- Department of Accounting and Finance
  - Concentrations: Accounting, Finance, Accounting Information Systems, Corporate Accounting and Finance
- School of Global Innovation and Leadership
  - Concentrations: Entrepreneurship, Operations and Supply Chain Management, International Business
- Department of Hospitality, Tourism, and Event Management
  - Concentration: Hospitality, Tourism & Event Management
- Information Systems and Technology
  - Concentration: Management Information Systems
- School of Management
  - Concentrations: Human Resources Management, Management
- Marketing and Business Analytics
  - Concentrations: Marketing, Business Analytics

Graduate Degrees and Certificates offered through the Lucas Graduate School of Business:

- MBA (Early Career and Professional)
- MS in Accounting and Analytics
- MS in Financial Analytics
- MS in Taxation
- MS in Transportation Management]
- Nine Graduate Academic Certification Programs

== Admissions ==
Undergraduate admission statistics
	Fall 2025	Fall 2024	Fall 2023	Fall 2022	Fall 2021
First-time Freshmen
Applicants	6,292	5,733	5,650	5,319	4,897
Admits	4,986	4,880	4,568	3,804	4,224
Admit rate	79%	85%	81%	72%	86%
Enrolled	1,000	864	801	683	824
Yield rate	20%	18%	18%	18%	20%
Transfers
Applicants	2,516	2,501	2,362	2,637	2,976
Admits	1,749	1,888	1,757	1,988	2,117
Admit rate	70%	75%	74%	75%	71%
Enrolled	940	866	752	861	937
Yield rate	54%	46%	43%	43%	44%

The Lucas College of Business has the same requirements as the whole university. San José State is objective for most applicants, where it primarily decides applicants based on GPA, SAT/ACT, and the rigor of classes taken during one's secondary school. State residency and graduating from a high school in the Santa Clara County are factors as well. Applicants who pose unique, personal circumstances may be given a different outlook on their application if and only if they apply to the Educational Opportunity Program at San José State.

== Rankings ==
View all rankings

- Poets&Quants’ Best Undergraduate Business Schools Of 2025; Ranked #1 among public undergraduate business schools in California (Poets&Quants for Undergrads)
- Poets&Quants’ Best Online MBA Programs For 2025; Ranked #34 in the U.S. and #2 among all public universities in California (Poets&Quants).
- Fortune’s Best MBA Programs for 2025; Ranked #47 in the U.S., #5 among public universities, and #11 for Best MBA Programs to Study International Business (Fortune Recommends).
- #1 Among Public Universities in the Country for Accounting Salaries for Graduates (Wall Street Journal).
- #2 Among Public Universities in the Country for Marketing Salaries for Graduates (Wall Street Journal).
- The Top Colleges for High-Paying Careers in Finance, Tech and Consulting; among public universities in the nation, SJSU ranks #7 for tech salaries and #20 for management consulting salaries (Wall Street Journal).
- The Lucas College and Graduate School of Business ranks in the top 20 among undergraduate business programs in California (US News & World Report).
- The Lucas College and Graduate School Online MBA Program Ranks Top 50 Nationally and #2 Among Public Universities in California

== Facilities ==
- Business Tower
- Boccardo Business Complex

== Centers and Institutes ==
- Accounting Advancement Center
- Center for Banking and Financial Services (CBFS)
- Global Leadership Advancement Center (GLAC)
- The High Technology Tax Institute (TEI)
- The Institute for People and Performance
- Mineta Transportation Institute (MTI)
- Silicon Valley Center for Entrepreneurship (SVCE)
- Silicon Valley Center for Operations & Technology Management (SVCOTM)

== Student Organizations ==
- Advancement Institute for Management (AIM)
- AIESEC
- Alpha Kappa Psi (AKP)
- Association of Latino Professionals For America (ALPFA)
- The Banking and Investment Association (BIA)
- Beta Alpha Psi (BAP)
- Black Business Student Association (BBSA)
- Consulting Group (CG)
- Delta Sigma Pi (DSP) - Theta Chi
- Financial Management Association (FMA)
- Graduate Business Students Association (GBSA)
- Hospitality Financial and Technology Professionals (HFTP)
- Information Systems Audit and Control Association (ISACA)
- Innovation, Design, Engineering, Art, and Science (IDEAS)
- Institute of Management Accountants (IMA)
- International Business Association (IBA)
- Latino Business Student Association (LBSA)
- Management Information Systems Association (MISA)
- Marketing Association (MA)
- Mineta Transportation Institute Student Association (MTI SA)
- Operations and Supply Chain Management Association (O&SCMA)
- Society for Human Resource Management (SHRM)
- Spartan Analytics (SA)
- Spartan Real Estate Association (SREA)
- Women in Business (WIB)
