= Santa Clara University Leavey School of Business =

Business school of Santa Clara University

Coordinates: 37°21′4.08″N 121°56′22.87″W

- Motto: Ad Majorem Dei Gloriam (Latin)
- Motto in English: For the Greater Glory of God
- Type: Private Roman Catholic (Jesuit)
- Established: 1923
- Affiliations: Santa Clara University
- Endowment: ▲$979.248 million (parent institution)
- Dean: Ravi Bapna
- Faculty: Total: 142 (Fall 2012) (80 full-time / 62 part-time)
- Administrative staff: Total: 42 (Fall 2012) (37 full-time / 5 part-time)
- Students: 2,541 (Fall 2012)
- Undergraduates: 1,588 (Fall 2012)
- Postgraduates: 953 (Fall 2012)
- Location: Santa Clara, California, United States
- Colors: Red and White
- Website: Official website

The Santa Clara University Leavey School of Business is the business school of Santa Clara University, a private academic institution in the heart of Silicon Valley (Santa Clara). The School of Business was founded in 1923 and accredited by the Association to Advance Collegiate Schools of Business thirty years later. Located in the heart of Silicon Valley, the Leavey School of Business provides undergraduate, graduate, and executive education.

== History ==
- 1851 Santa Clara College established
- 1923 School of Business and Administration established
- 1953 Business School accredited by Association to Advance Collegiate Schools of Business
- 1957 Executive Development Center established
- 1959 MBA program created
- 1963 Graduate program recognized through AACSB accreditation
- 1975 Combined JD/MBA program created
- 1983 Dedication of the Dorothy and Thomas Leavey School of Business
- 1999 Executive MBA program created
- 2008 Lucas Hall business facility dedicated

== Academics ==
The Leavey School of Business, which serves over 2,000 undergraduate and graduate students, has six academic departments including Accounting, Economics, Finance, Management, Marketing, and Operations Management and Information Systems.

- Bachelor of Science in Commerce (BSC)

Degrees in Accounting, Accounting & Information Systems (AIS), Economics, Finance, Management, Marketing, Operations and Management Information Systems (OMIS)

- Master of Business Administration (MBA)

Different methods of completing the degree: Full-Time, Part-Time (evenings and Saturdays), or Executive program. The Online MBA program was ranked #17 by The Princeton Review among the Top 50 Online MBAs for 2025.
-Joint-degree with School of Law JD/MBA

- Master of Science in Business Analytics The Online MS in Business Analytics program was ranked #15 by Fortune among the Best Online Master’s in Business Analytics Programs for 2025.
- Master of Science in Finance
- Master of Science in Information Systems (MSIS)

-Joint-degree with School of Law JD/MSIS

- Master of Science in Supply Chain Management

== Centers & Institutes ==
"Centers and institutes in the School of Business provide scholars and organizations an interdisciplinary approach to business issues."

- Ciocca Center for Innovation & Entrepreneurship (CCIE)
- Silicon Valley Executive Center (SVEC)
- My Own Business Institute (MOBI)
- Retail Management Institute (RMI)
- Certified Equity Professional Institute (CEPI) created the Certified Equity Professional (CEP) designation

== Ranking ==
U.S. News & World Report ranked the Leavey School of Business 25th in the U.S. among part-time MBA programs in the "Best Graduate Schools 2018" ranking. This ranking, up from No. 37 the previous year, places the Leavey School of Business 2nd in the Bay Area, 2nd among Jesuit Schools, and 4th in California.

Graduates of the MBA program earn the 9th highest salaries in the nation compared with other MBA graduates according to a PayScale study published in 2016.

The Master's in Finance program was ranked 3rd on the West Coast and 29th nationally in the 2017 Best Finance Program Rankings by The Financial Engineer (TFE) Times.

The undergraduate business program was ranked 63rd in the U.S. by U.S. News & World Report in 2017. Bloomberg BusinessWeek ranked it 51st in the U.S. for 2016, and in 2013 ranked its macroeconomics sub-specialty 4th in the nation among undergraduate business schools.

For 2021, Santa Clara University was ranked #53 in National Universities. Schools are ranked according to their performance across a set of widely accepted indicators of excellence by U.S. News & World Report.

== Leadership ==
The Leavey School of Business is led by dean, Ravi Bapna, appointed September 1, 2026.

Previous deans and their tenure:

- Ravi Bapna, (September 1, 2026-present)
- Ed Grier, dean (July 1, 2021-December 31, 2025)
- Naren Agrawal, interim dean (2020-2021; January 1, 2026-September 1, 2026), currently Benjamin and Mae Swig Professor of Information Systems and Analytics
- Caryn Beck-Dudley, dean (2015-2020), President and CEO of AACSB
- S. Andrew Starbird, interim dean (2009-2010), dean (2010-2015), currently director of the My Own Business Institute at SCU
- Barry Z. Posner (1996-2009), professor of leadership and best-selling co-author of The Leadership Challenge
- Alexander Field, acting dean (1995–1996), currently Orradre Professor of Economics
- James L. Koch (1990–1995), currently Don C. Dodson Distinguished Service Professor
- Albert Bruno, acting dean (1988–1989), currently Cleary Professor of Marketing
- Andre Delbecq (1978–1988), currently McCarthy Presidential Professor
- Charles J. Dirksen (1941–1978)

== Lucas Hall ==
Lucas Hall is among the newer buildings on the Santa Clara University campus and is home to the Leavey School of Business. Construction began in May 2007 and the building was formally dedicated on September 14, 2008, in honor of Donald L. Lucas, veteran Silicon Valley venture capitalist.

At approximately 86,000 square feet (8,000 m^{2}), the facility is two and a half times the size of the former home of the Business School, Kenna Hall. The three-story building contains 12 classrooms (two dedicated to executive education), 102 faculty offices, 16 team project rooms, six large executive-style conference rooms, and a 100-seat seminar room. The center core of the facility contains the Dukes Business Services Center and the Cadence CyberCafe.

== Notable alumni ==
- William Dallas (1987), founder and owner, Dallas Capital
- David Drummond (Google) (1985), vice president and general counsel, Google
- Fred Franzia (1965), owner of Bronco Winery and maker of Charles Shaw wine
- Jack Kuehler (1954), former president of IBM
- Thomas E. Leavey (1922), co-founder of Farmers Insurance
- Chris Malachowsky (M.S. 1986), co-founder and senior VP of engineering and operations, NVIDIA
- Peter Oppenheimer (MBA 1987), CFO and senior vice president of Apple Computer
- George Reyes (MBA 1979), CFO, and former senior vice president, Google
- Stephen Schott (1960), former owner of the Oakland Athletics
- John A. Sobrato (1960), billionaire owner and chairman, Sobrato Development Companies
- Thomas D. Terry (S.J.), president of Novitiate Wines
