= Santa Clara Broncos =

Intercollegiate sports teams of Santa Clara University

- University: Santa Clara University
- Conference: West Coast Conference (primary); GCC (women's water polo)
- NCAA: Division I
- Athletic director: Heather M. Owen
- Location: Santa Clara, California
- Varsity teams: 20
- Basketball arena: Leavey Center
- Baseball stadium: Stephen Schott Stadium
- Softball stadium: Santa Clara Softball Stadium
- Soccer stadium: Stevens Stadium
- Volleyball arena: Leavey Center
- Mascot: Bucky
- Nickname: Broncos
- Fight song: "Fight For Santa Clara"
- Colors: Maroon and white
- Website: santaclarabroncos.com

The Santa Clara Broncos are athletic teams that represent Santa Clara University. The school colors are red and white. The nicknames for teams is The Broncos and the student fans are referred to as the "Ruff Riders". The Broncos compete in the NCAA Division I (NCAA) as members of the West Coast Conference of which Santa Clara is a charter member.

== Sports sponsored ==
Men's sports	Women's sports
Baseball	Basketball
Basketball	Beach volleyball
Cross country	Cross country
Golf	Golf
Rowing	Rowing
Soccer	Soccer
Tennis	Softball
Track and field^{1}	Tennis
Water polo	Track and field^{1}
	Volleyball
	Water polo
^{1} – includes both indoor and outdoor

=== Baseball ===
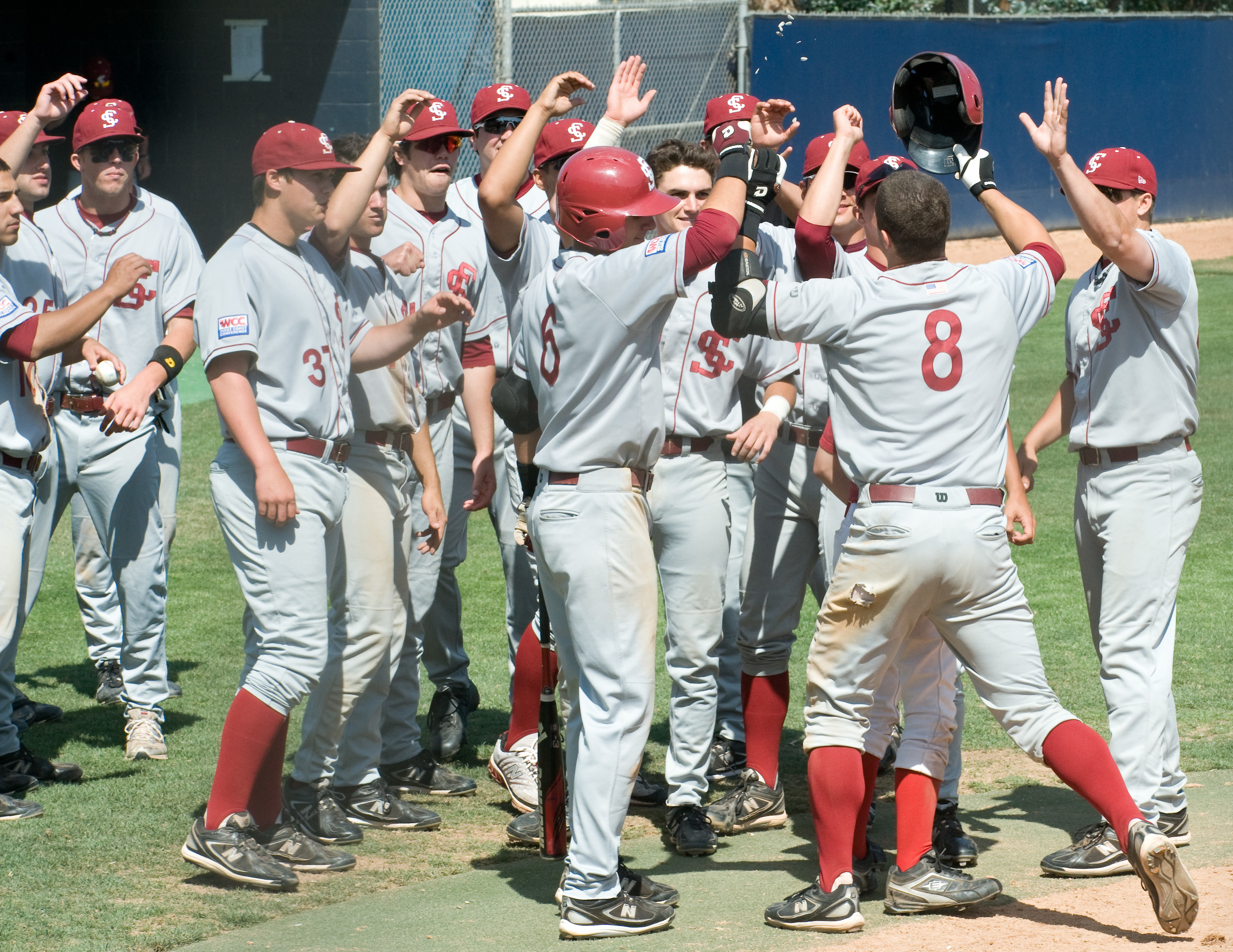
The Broncos baseball team celebrates a home run hit by Tommy Medica in 2008

The Santa Clara University Broncos baseball team is the varsity intercollegiate baseball team that represents the school in NCAA Division I. Santa Clara Baseball competes in the West Coast Conference, of which the Broncos were a charter member. The Broncos play their home games on campus at Stephen Schott Stadium, which opened in 2005. The Broncos and are led by head coach Rusty Filter, who is in his third season.

Santa Clara began play in 1883 and has enjoyed a long history of baseball excellence. Santa Clara has won eleven conference titles and appeared in twelve NCAA Tournaments, including a runner-up finish in the 1962 College World Series. Individually, 34 Broncos have been named All-Americans, and 158 players have been drafted in the MLB Draft, with 48 players making it to the Major Leagues.

=== Men's basketball ===
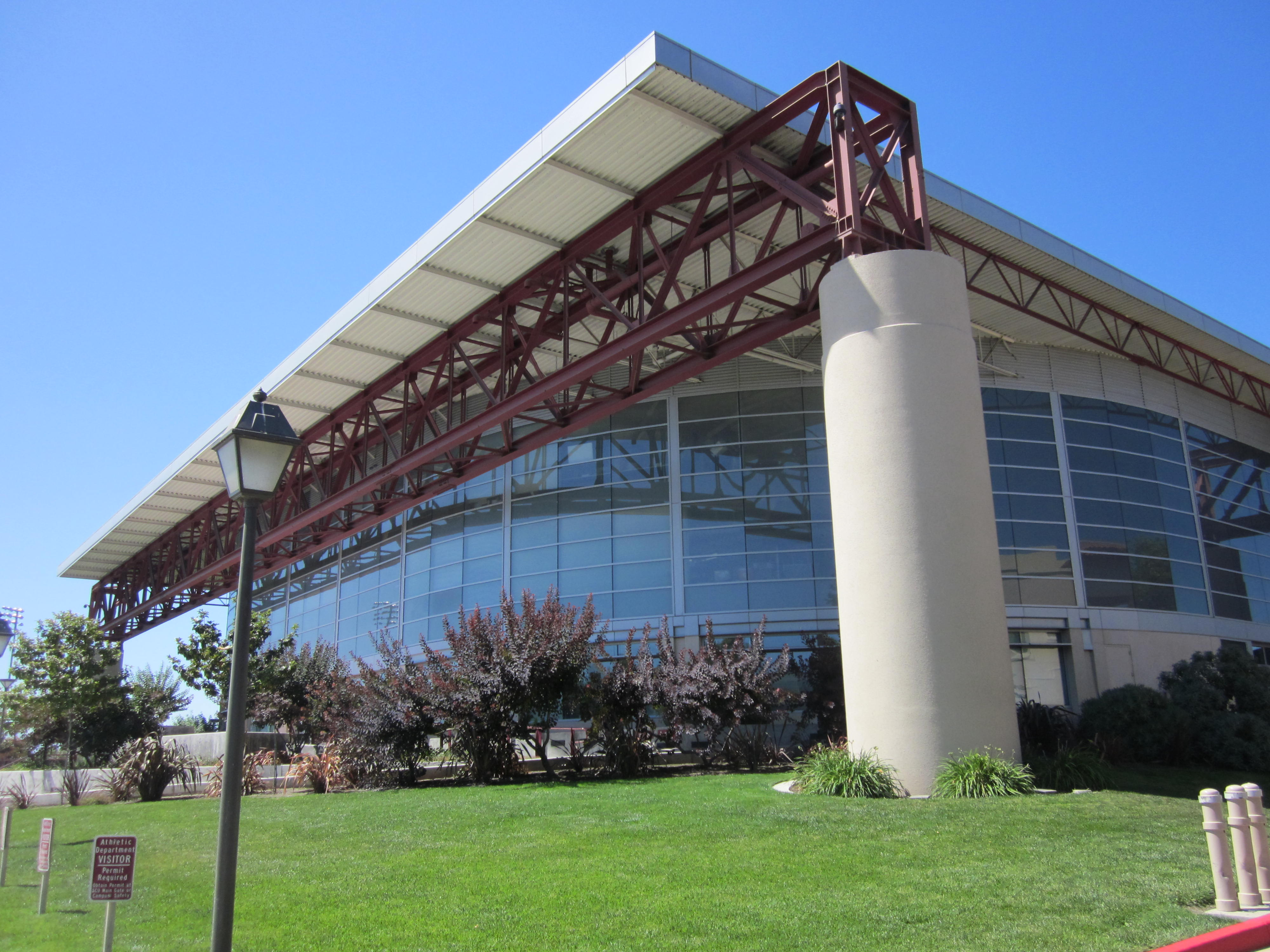
Leavey Center, Santa Clara's basketball arena

Men's basketball played its first season in 1904. Since then, the men's basketball team has historically been a strong program within the West Coast Conference. The program has produced 13 All-Americans, with their first, Ralph Giannini, coming in the 1940 season. The program has produced NBA stars Steve Nash, and Kurt Rambis, as well as college stars Ken Sears and Bob Feerick. The Team has played in the NCAA tournament in 11 different seasons, reaching the 1952 Final Four. The 1992–1993 Santa Clara team, led by future NBA MVP Steve Nash, was one of 6 #15 seeds to defeat a #2 seed in the NCAA tournament.

On February 12, 2007, the men's basketball team snapped Gonzaga's 50-game home winning streak. At the time, it was the longest ongoing home winning streak in the NCAA.

The Broncos are led by head coach Herb Sendek, a coach of the year in three different conferences, who is in his ninth season.

=== Women's basketball ===
Women's basketball played its first season in 1963. Since then, the women's basketball team has historically been a strong program within the West Coast Conference. The Women's Basketball team won the WNIT in 1991. The 2012–13 Santa Clara Broncos women's basketball team was another notable team. Head Coach JR Payne signed a contract with the Santa Clara Bronco in the 2014 season. Finishing with a record of 10–20 during the season of 2014–15, the Broncos came out with an outstanding record of 23–9 beating Stanford University on November 23, (61–58). Coach JR Payne accepted a head coaching position at Colorado University at the end of the 2015–16 season. In April 2016 the Broncos hired Bill Carr, who was the head coach for 8 seasons. In October of 2024 coach Carr resigned and Associate Head Coach Michael Floyd was named interim Head Coach.

=== Men's soccer ===
The men's soccer team is one of the nation's elite teams having since 2006 been among the top eight programs of the NCAA for developing professional players overall. The men's soccer team has reached the championship match of the College Cup three times. In 1989, they faced the University of Virginia; both teams were declared co-champions after the game ended in a 1–1 tie. In 1991, they again faced Virginia and again tied after regulation, this time 0–0, but lost on penalty kicks. In 1999, they lost to Indiana University, 0–1. The men's soccer team is led by coach Cameron Rast, who is in his 23rd season at Santa Clara.

=== Women's soccer ===
The women's soccer team is one of the nation's elite programs in the NCAA consistently ranking among the top ten teams nationally with twenty consecutive years in the Top 10. The program won the national title in the 2001 NCAA Women's Soccer Championship, beating University of North Carolina 1–0, and again in the 2020 NCAA Championship, defeating Florida State 4–1 on penalties. The team was mentioned several times in the film Bend It Like Beckham.

The team has had over 40 players in play in the top professional leagues in the country: Women's Professional Soccer and National Women's Soccer League. The team's most famous player is Brandi Chastain who took the Broncos to two NCAA Final Four appearances in 1989 and 1990. She would later be on the American Olympic team that won the gold medal in 1996 and the American World Cup teams that won in 1991 and 1999. Her husband Jerry Smith is the coach of the Santa Clara women's team, currently in his 36th season at the helm. Other notable players include Olympian Aly Wagner, 2015 and 2019 Women's World Cup champion Julie Ertz, and United States women's national soccer team & OL Reign player, Sofia Huerta.

== Former varsity sports ==
=== Football ===
Santa Clara University fielded an intercollegiate football team from 1896 to 1992. The Broncos were the first team to play the Cal Bears in Memorial Stadium. In Santa Clara's football heyday, they drew crowds of up to 60,000 to Kezar Stadium in San Francisco, where they played home games. The Broncos competed favorably on a national scale, winning the 1937 and 1938 Sugar Bowls (both against Louisiana State) and the 1950 Orange Bowl against Paul "Bear" Bryant's Kentucky Wildcats, 21–13.

Combatting increased costs, rising enrollments at public universities and the advent of professional football, Santa Clara dropped football in 1952. The team was reinstated in 1959. It competed favorably at the college division (later Division II) level until football was once again discontinued in 1992, due to new NCAA regulations which mandated all sports be played at the same level at each university. Santa Clara had fielded all Division I teams with the exception of the Division II football team, and elected not to field a team at the Division I-AA level.

There is no indication football will return to the school in the future, although rumors of the return of Bronco football have not been put to rest. Advocates for the reinstatement of the football program argue that major collegiate football will generate enormous media buzz surrounding the small university.

== Club sports ==
Sponsored club sports include:

=== Men's ===
- Ice hockey
- Lacrosse
- Rugby
- Ultimate
- Volleyball

=== Women's ===
- Field hockey
- Lacrosse
- Rugby
- Ultimate
- Volleyball

=== Coed ===
- Boxing
- Cycling
- Equestrian
- Paintball
- Sailing
- Shotokan
- Swimming
- Triathlon

The Santa Clara Women's Lacrosse team has made it to nationals multiple years and placed 3rd in the 2011 season. In 2008, the Santa Clara Paintball Team made it to the final rounds of the NCPA national competition in Florida.

=== Rugby ===
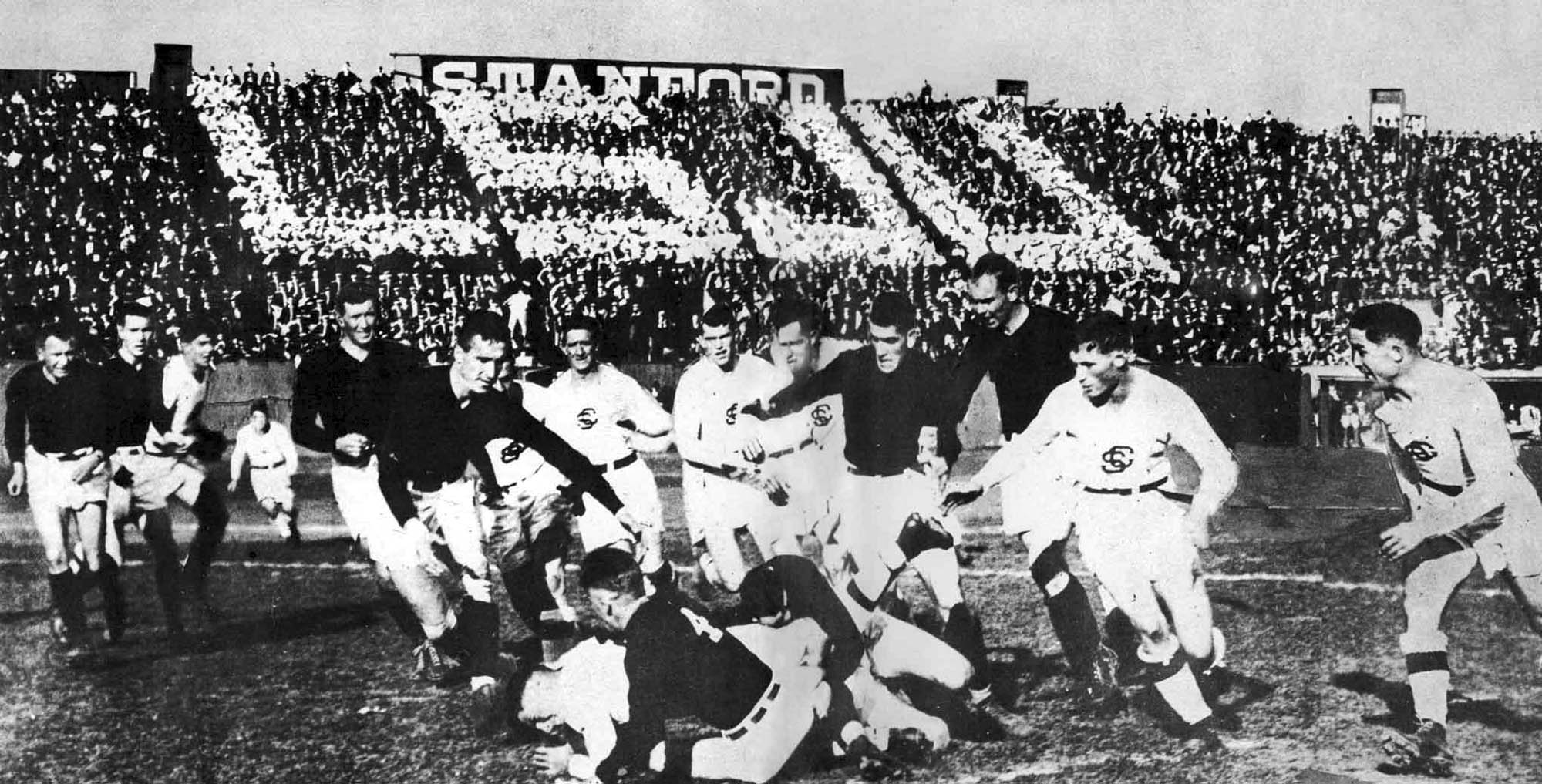
Santa Clara (in white) played the Big Game under the rules of rugby in 1917

The Santa Clara University Rugby Football Club has a rich history. The rugby team began in 1907, around the time that a number of California schools were dropping American football due to its violence. The team went undefeated in the 1916 regular season, and in the "Big Game" against Stanford — the only other undefeated rugby team that season — Santa Clara won 28–5. Santa Clara's Rudy Scholz was a member of the U.S. national rugby teams that won gold at the 1920 and 1924 Olympics. Santa Clara rugby faded after that, however, and it was not until the 1960s that the rugby team was re-founded.

Following their success on the DII national stage and the creation of the College Premier Division, Santa Clara made the move to DI in the Northern California League (Nor Cal League). In 2012 Santa Clara men's rugby won the 2012 Nor Cal Conference Championship and advanced to the round of 16 of the D1 National Playoffs. In 2013, Santa Clara was promoted to Division 1-A and played in the California conference. In 2014, Santa Clara finished second in the California conference, qualifying for the playoffs, beating Colorado State 49–12 in the round of 16, before losing to Saint Mary's in the quarterfinals. Santa Clara rugby is led by head coach Paul Keeler.
