= Yavneh Day School =

Yavneh Day School may refer to:

- Yavneh Day School (Cincinnati, Ohio) or Rockwern Academy, an independent private pre-K-8 Jewish day school
- Yavneh Day School (Los Gatos, California), a private K–8 Jewish day school
