= Bapna =

Bapna is an Indian surname. Notable people with the surname include:

- Rajiv Bapna (fl. 1985), Indian businessman
- Ravi Bapna (fl. 1993), Indian-born American data scientist
- Shruti Bapna (fl. 2008), Indian actress
