= Lewis Wolff =

American real estate developer (born 1935)

Lewis N. Wolff
- Born: 1935 (age 90–91); St. Louis, Missouri
- Education: University of Wisconsin (B.A.); Washington University in St. Louis (M.B.A.)
- Occupation: Investor
- Known for: Former owner and current chairman emeritus for the Oakland Athletics; Former owner of the San Jose Earthquakes
- Spouse: Jean Wolff
- Children: 3

Lewis N. Wolff (born December 13, 1935) is an American real estate developer. Wolff had been co-chairman of the Board of Sunstone Investors, Inc. from October 2004 to April 2014. Wolff owned sports franchises. He was most well known for his ownership of the Oakland Athletics and as the co-owner of the San Jose Earthquakes of Major League Soccer. However, in November 2016, Wolff sold his share in the Oakland Athletics to John J. Fisher, and currently serves as the team's Chairman Emeritus. Wolff is credited with the redevelopment and revitalization of downtown San Jose, California where he was the largest developer of offices, hotels, and parking for many years.

== Early life and education ==
Lewis "Lew" Wolff was born on December 13, 1935 to a Jewish family in St. Louis and was raised in the middle-class suburbs of University City, Missouri. Wolff graduated from the University of Wisconsin-Madison where he was a member of the Pi Lambda Phi fraternity, and a fraternity brother of former MLB Commissioner Bud Selig and US Senator Herb Kohl. In 1961, he earned an MBA from the Olin Business School at Washington University in St. Louis.

== Career ==
In 1958, Wolff took a job as a real estate appraiser in St. Louis. In 1961, his company sent him to Los Angeles to open a regional office and in 1963, he co-founded a real estate consulting firm. In the 1960s, he was very successful developing the booming San Jose market and earned a solid reputation in the industry. In the 1970s, he accepted a position with 20th Century Fox tasked with managing its worldwide real estate investments. Wolff's approach was to find partners willing to fund the majority of the investment then take a more passive role, which would allow Wolff to directly manage the investment himself.

In 1994, Wolff founded Maritz, Wolff & Co with Philip Maritz in St. Louis, Missouri. The company owned interest in eighteen hotel and resort properties around the world, including the Fairmont San Jose Hotel, the Fairmont San Francisco, the Carlyle Hotel in New York, the Four Seasons Hotel Nevis, the Four Seasons Hotel Toronto, and the Park Hyatt Sydney. In 2011 Wolff and his partner, Philip Maritz, orchestrated the $800 million sale of five hotels, including The Carlyle and the Rosewood Management Company to New World, a Hong Kong-based real estate and hotel company.

In the past, he has been a co-owner of the St. Louis Blues of the National Hockey League and the Golden State Warriors of the National Basketball Association. On April 1, 2005, Wolff and an ownership group led by The Gap heir, John J. Fisher, purchased the Oakland Athletics baseball team for $180 million from Stephen Schott and Ken Hofmann. In 2006, the A's ownership group purchased an option to revive the San Jose Earthquakes franchise of Major League Soccer. At the 2007 MLS All Star Game, it was announced that Wolff had exercised the option, and the Earthquakes began play during the 2008 MLS season.

=== Oakland A's ===
Wolff was the Managing Partner of the Oakland A’s from 2005 -2015. Wolff and his partner, John Fisher invested $100 million and assumed $80 million in debt to acquire the team. During Wolff’s tenure, the team reached the play-offs 40% of the time, (Wolff credits Billy Beane with the team’s performance), never had a capital call and returned $58,400,000 of the initial $100 million investment.

== Philanthropy ==
Under Wolff's ownership, the Oakland Athletics were community-minded. In 2011, Sony Pictures complied with Wolff's wishes in staging the motion picture premiere of Moneyball in Oakland, including a charity component that raised $370,000 for the Children's Hospital and Research Center Oakland and Stand Up To Cancer. Wolff is also an active participant in the A's Home Run Readers program.

The San Jose Mercury-News ranked Wolff first in its annual listing of the Bay Area's 25 Most Powerful Sports Figures in both 2006 and 2007. In September, 2008, the Silicon Valley Leadership Group also presented Wolff with its prestigious "Community Cornerstone Award," given to "a Silicon Valley leader who has displayed a lifetime of impeccable ethics, business achievement and community engagement." Wolff's Family Foundation supports numerous causes with emphasis on Stand-Up to Cancer, KIPP Charter schools, Planned Parenthood, Yavneh Day School, Los Gatos, California. The most recent activity is a personal campaign to research and address the impact of Narcissistic Personality Disorder (NPD) in the field of family law and children of divorce.

== Stadium efforts ==
In 2015, Wolff claimed that the A's are "looking to stay in Oakland. ... We have not been looking at venues in other places in the Bay Area," he said. "And we are not planning to look." In 2014, the A's signed a 10-year lease to stay in the Oakland Coliseum. Shortly thereafter, the A's invested $10 million in new video boards at the Coliseum as part of the lease agreement.

== Personal life ==
Wolff is married to Jean Wolff and has three children and four grandchildren. They live in the Westwood neighborhood of Los Angeles.
