= Santa Clara Broncos baseball =

Baseball team in the United States

- 2026 Santa Clara Broncos baseball team
- Founded: 1883
- University: Santa Clara University
- Head coach: Rusty Filter (9th season)
- Conference: West Coast Conference
- Location: Santa Clara, California
- Home stadium: Stephen Schott Stadium (Capacity: 1,500)
- Nickname: Broncos
- Colors: Maroon and white

College World Series runner-up
- 1962

College World Series appearances
- 1962

NCAA tournament appearances
- 1959, 1962, 1968, 1969, 1970, 1971, 1972, 1978, 1988, 1994, 1996, 1997, 2023

Conference tournament champions
- 2023

Conference regular season champions
- 1962, 1968, 1969, 1970, 1971, 1972, 1978, 1982, 1994, 1996, 1997

The Santa Clara Broncos baseball team is the varsity intercollegiate baseball team that represents Santa Clara University in NCAA Division I college baseball. Santa Clara Baseball competes in the West Coast Conference, of which the Santa Clara Broncos were a charter member. The Broncos play their home games on campus at Stephen Schott Stadium, which opened in 2005. The Broncos and are led by head coach Rusty Filter, currently in his fifth season.

Having begun play in 1883, Santa Clara is currently in its 129th season of varsity baseball, and has enjoyed a long history of baseball excellence. Santa Clara has won 11 Conference Pennants, and appeared in 12 NCAA Tournaments, including a runner-up finish in the 1962 College World Series. Individually, 34 Broncos have been named All-Americans, and 158 players have been drafted in the MLB Draft, with 48 players making it to the Major Leagues.

== History ==
=== The early years ===
Baseball is the oldest sport at Santa Clara, with the first recorded season coming in 1883. Prior to that, Santa Clara students had long engaged in baseball games against one another. Santa Clara's first intercollegiate baseball game came in 1883, when the Jesuit fathers finally allowed Santa Clara students to take an overnight trip to play fledgling Saint Mary's College, then located in San Francisco. Santa Clara lost the game, but began an athletic relationship with Saint Mary's that has blossomed into one of the oldest and most heated athletic rivalries in the west. For years, it was a long-standing tradition for Santa Clara and Saint Mary's to play on St. Patricks day. Early opponents like Pacific (1895), and Stanford (1892) remain fixtures on Santa Clara's baseball schedules 140 years later.

The seriousness that the students and administration gave to baseball is reflected in the caliber of coaches that were hired by the school. Early managers like Billy Hulen, Joe Corbett, Jay Hughes, Jimmy Byrnes, and Patsy O'Rourke were all former major league players who had made the trek west to coach baseball at what was the known as Santa Clara College.

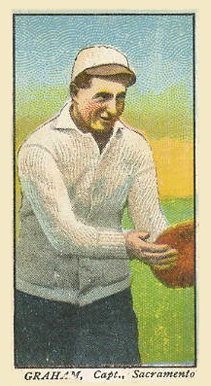
Charlie Graham was a Santa Clara Player, Coach and Professor prior to a Major League Career.

Santa Clara's Frank Arellanes was the first Hispanic professional baseball player, who played for the Boston Red Sox in 1908. Another Bronco baseball player from the early period was Harry Wolter, who recorded the first hit in then-new Fenway Park as a member of the Red Sox. Elmer Stricklett, who played at Santa Clara and made his way to the Major Leagues, is considered the inventor of the spitball.

The most notable contributor to Santa Clara Baseball was 1898 graduate Charlie Graham. A Santa Clara native, Graham played two years of baseball at Santa Clara, returned to teach Latin and Greek, as well as coach from 1901 to 1903. Graham then embarked on a baseball career which saw him rise from obscurity in the western minor leagues to becoming the starting catcher for the Boston Americans, and star pitcher Cy Young. Unfortunately, Graham was heartbroken by the news of the 1906 San Francisco earthquake, ending his career only a few months into the season. He returned home, and ultimately became the owner of the San Francisco Seals, and donated generously to Santa Clara and the baseball program. The university's largest dormitory, Graham Hall, is named in his honor.

Due to the nature of College Baseball in the Pre-War years, Santa Clara had no conference affiliation and made no post-season appearances in the early years, as those things had yet to come into existence. However, the competitiveness of the Santa Clara teams from prior to 1946 is exhibited in the number of Major League players produced in this period, notably Harry Wolter (Major League debut in 1907), Elmer Stricklett (1904), Hardin Barry (1912), Justin Fitzgerald (1911), Hal Chase (1905), Charlie Graham (1906), Tillie Shafer (1908), Frank Arellanes (1908), William Hogan (1911), Erv Kantlehner (1914), Frank Shellenback (1918), Bevo LeBourveau (1919), Bill Lawrence (1932), Jim O'Connell (1923), Marv Owen (1931), and Les Powers (1938).

=== Wartime cancellation, post-war success ===
Santa Clara was forced to cancel the baseball program for two seasons, 1943 and 1944, due to wartime restrictions and a devotion of resources and manpower to the war effort, though baseball remained a popular form of recreation on campus.

Following the end of the war, Santa Clara returned to the diamond and found immediate success under John "Paddy" Cottrell, who coached the team from 1946 to 1951. Cottrell retired in 1951, but after watching Santa Clara languish under subsequent coaches, the university and Alumni asked him to come out of retirement in 1961. With Cottrell at the helm things began to fall into place for Santa Clara.

Santa Clara, along with Stanford, California, USC, and Others, formed the California Intercollegiate Baseball Association in 1960. For the first time in their already 80-year-long history, Santa Clara baseball had a conference home. The CIBA stood as one of the preeminent baseball conferences, and allowed Santa Clara to recruit the highest possible caliber of player. Though Santa Clara stumbled in Cottrell's first year at the helm, in 1962 the Broncos jumped out to an impressive start, and held the #1 spot in the polls for almost the entirety of the 1962 season. The baseball crazed Bay Area, who had just received their first major league franchises a few years earlier, lent their full support to the Broncos. During this season, Santa Clara games were first made available by radio broadcast. Led by five future major leaguers – Bob Garibaldi, Ernie Fazio, John Boccabella, Pete Magrini, and Tim Cullen, the Broncos found their way to the College World Series finals. In heartbreaking fashion, Santa Clara fell to Michigan on a 15th inning passed ball. Bob Garibaldi was the College World Series MVP, and became the first player to have a million dollar signing bonus.

The success of the 1962 Broncos helped spur the fundraising efforts that lead to the building of Buck Shaw Stadium, home to Bronco baseball from 1963 until they moved to a baseball specific venue in 2005, Stephen Schott Stadium. John Cottrell, in his second stint as the Bronco manager from 1961 to 1964, amassed a 102–44 record, good for a .699 winning percentage. Collectively, the Broncos won nearly 70% of their games from 1961 to 1979.

=== Taormina takes over ===
He was followed as manager by Sal Taormina, who went 511–249 from 1965 to 1979, a .672 winning percentage. "Dirty" Al Gallagher, a future major leaguer, helped ease the transition from Cottrell to Taormina.

The CIBA Era ended when the WCAC, the former name of the modern WCC, began sponsoring baseball in 1968. The Broncos reeled off Conference championships and NCAA tournament appearances for four consecutive years, followed by three straight second-place finishes, setting the early tone that Santa Clara would be a name to respect in WCC baseball. To date, only Pepperdine holds more League Titles, NCAA Tournament Appearances, and College World Series appearances than the Broncos.

In his final year as Head Coach at SCU, Taormina took the Broncos back to the NCAA tournament in 1978.

=== Hot and cold ===
After the retirement of Coach Taormina, the Broncos were led by Al Endriss and Jerry McClain, neither of whom could replicate the success that Coach Taormina had sustained over his tenure. Santa Clara, however, found a dependable manager once again when alumnus John Oldham took the reins in 1985. Oldham would coach the Broncos for 12 seasons, leading SCU to 4 NCAA tournaments appearances, first in 1988, and then in 1994, 1996, and 1997. Notable players to play for Oldham include John Savage and Randy Winn. Santa Clara's Randy Winn, who also played basketball for the Broncos, enjoyed a decade long Major League career, and helped lead the Broncos to the NCAA tournament in basketball in 1994.

For 8 seasons, from 1977 to 1984, the WCAC ceased to sponsor baseball, and the Broncos found a home in the NCBA, the Northern California Baseball Association. Santa Clara and rival Fresno State dominated NCBA competition, as the Broncos and Bulldogs were the only teams to win the NCBA championship while the league existed. Santa Clara won the league twice in their stay, and appeared in the NCAA tournament in 1978. In 1985, the Broncos returned to the WCAC, which shortened its name to the WCC in 1988.

In the NCAA tournament era, the Broncos have only been coached 11 men, but only 4 have taken the team to the Tournament: Bill Leonard, Paddy Cottrell, Sal Taormina, and John Oldham. Despite this, the Broncos 12 NCAA tournament trips ranks second all-time in the WCC. Santa Clara's baseball team has enjoyed periods of being both hot and cold; having sustained success and reaching reached NCAA tournament appearances under those four long tenured coaches, but sitting on sitting on the outside looking in while coached by anyone else.

In 1998, Santa Clara introduced Mark O'Brien as head coach. O'Brien would stay until 2011, in a tenure characterized by tantalizingly close results, with many years finishing in the top third of the conference, but never winning a conference title or making an NCAA tournament trip.

Despite a string of 4 consecutive 1st and 2nd-place finished from 2001 to 2004 under Mark O'Brien, Santa Clara has not returned to the NCAA tournament since 1997. While at the helm of the Broncos, Mark O'Brien and his staff were said to have struggled to compete in recruiting while playing at the outdated multi-purpose Buck Shaw Stadium. Santa Clara responded by building the $8.6 million Stephen Schott Stadium, a 1,500 seat state-of-the-art baseball specific venue that is one of the finest facilities of its size on the West Coast. The stadium was financed in large part by Santa Clara Alumnus Stephen Schott, a varsity baseball player in 1960, and at that time, owner of the Oakland Athletics.

However, the push to the top that the university and boosters expected from the new facility didn't materialize. From 2000 to 2004, the last seasons at Buck Shaw, the Broncos never finished lower than third place. However, when the Broncos moved to the new Stephen Schott Stadium, Mark O'Brien never lead the Broncos to anything higher than third, and twice finished as low as eighth. Since playing in a conference for the first time in 1960, the Broncos had never finished lower than fifth, and that had only happened three times in the 45-year span of conference play prior to moving to Schott.

Because of these disappointing results for the historic program in a brand new facility, Mark O'Brien was fired in 2011 and replaced with longtime UCSD manager, Dan O'Brien, no relation.

Mark O'Brien's tenure was not without notable products—Santa Clara's Daniel Nava made an improbable run from SCU baseball manager to a contributing player on the 2013 Red Sox, who won the world series, and Santa Clara's Tommy Medica made his MLB debut in 2013 for the San Diego Padres.

=== Dan O'Brien and the "relentless development" era ===
Dan O'Brien, the 43rd manager of the Santa Clara Baseball program, came to Santa Clara from University of California, San Diego, where he was a player, assistant coach, and then head coach for a total of 16 seasons. O'Brien had led the Tritons from Division III to Division II, building the program into a national championship contender. He had led the Tritons to the NCAA Division II baseball tournament six times, and twice to the Division II College World Series, finishing as runner-up in 2010.

O'Brien began the task of rebuilding the Bronco baseball program, leading the Broncos to a 26–28 record and a 9th-place finish in the WCC. Following the loss of the top five pitchers from 2012, Santa Clara sank to its lowest baseball nadir, finishing in last for the second year in a row with a 1–23 mark in the WCC. Despite the early rebuilding struggles, in 2014 O'Brien guided the Broncos to a 16–11 record in league play, their best record in the WCC since 2003, which earned them their first ever berth in the WCC Baseball Tournament. The four-team tournament was introduced in 2013, replacing the two-team championship that the conference had used since 1998. The appearance in the WCC Tournament marked the first time that Santa Clara had appeared in the post-season in 16 years.

O'Brien vowed to return to Santa Clara to the baseball prominence it had enjoyed for nearly 110 years prior to the struggles of the Broncos since the retirement of John Oldham. O'Brien placed an emphasis on constant player development, with a system he called "relentless development". In addition, O'Brien felt that Santa Clara had shifted away from the old-school baseball mentality that once had characterized the program. As a result, Santa Clara introduced throwback uniforms in the 2013 season which were based on the uniforms worn by the Broncos in the late 1930s.

=== Rusty Filter Era ===
Rusty Filter was brought in as the 44th manager of the Santa Clara Baseball program in June 2017; after spending the previous eight years at Stanford where he was among the top pitching coaches in the nation. In his first season at the helm, Filter led the Broncos to a 26–26 record and a 6th-place finish in the WCC, doubling the Broncos win total from the 2017 season. The Broncos could not build on the season in 2019, finishing the season with a 12–40 record overall, including 5–22 in WCC play, leading to finishing 10th in the conference. With two years two learn Filter's style of play, and 18 seniors on the roster, the Broncos got off to a hot start to the 2020 season with a 12–5 record. Two of the 12 wins were against top 25 teams in #25 Stanford at home and #3 Georgia on the road. Just before conference play started, the NCAA canceled all spring sports for the remainder of their respective seasons due to the COVID-19 pandemic. It was announced in May that 15 of the 18 seniors would be returning for their extra year of eligibility in 2021, granted by the NCAA to all spring athletes.

=== Santa Clara University conference history ===
- 1960–1967: CIBA
- 1968–1976: West Coast (Athletic) Conference
- 1977–1984: NCBA
- 1985–present: West Coast Conference

=== Santa Clara Baseball Stadium History ===
The Santa Clara Baseball team played their home games on campus at Buck Shaw Stadium from 1963 to 2004. Prior to 1963, Santa Clara played their games at the extant Washington Field, a large diamond located on the campus of Santa Clara High School, now Buchsher Middle School. A new era for Santa Clara University baseball began on April 30, 2005, with the sold-out opening of Stephen Schott Stadium. The $8.6 million project was kicked off in January, 2004 with a $4 million pledge from former SCU baseball player and former owner of the Oakland Athletics, Stephen Schott. The 1,500-seat stadium houses the entire Santa Clara baseball program, including its training, practice and equipment facilities. Also equipped with a 600 square-foot press box and VIP suite, Schott Stadium is one of the premier college baseball stadiums on the West Coast. Designed with player development in mind, Schott Stadium provides the Santa Clara baseball staff and players with every possible tool for success.

== Coaching Records ==
Head Coach	Tenure	Record
Rusty Filter	2018–present	152–179
Dan O'Brien	2012–2017	128–194
Mark O'Brien	2002–2011	258–289
Mike Cummins	1998–2001	92–132
John Oldham	1985–1997	433–324–6
Jerry McClain	1981–1984	125–115–1
Al Endriss	1980	25–30
Sal Taormina	1965–1979	511–249
John Cottrell	1961–1964	102–44
Bill Leonard	1958–1960	57–48
Chuck Bedolla	1954–1957	36–77
Bill Prentice	1952–1953	32–27
John J. “Paddy” Cottrell	1946–1951	76–56
Pee Wee Reese	1943	12–8
Len Casanova	1940–1942	39–25
Justin Fitzgerald	1935–1939	26–79
Duster Mails	1931–1933	25–30–2
Marv Owen	1930	6–10–1
Justin Fitzgerald	1927–1929	31–19–1
Sam Agnew	1926	8–12
Sam Agnew; Charlie Scherf	1925	8–12
Eddie Kienholz	1924	8–8
Joe Aurreocoechea	1922–1923	8–15–2
Robert E. Harmon	1920–1921	10–13–1
Joe Aurreocoechea	1919	8–15–2
Edward R. “Tub” Spencer	1917–1918	12–12
Justin Fitzgerald	1916	6–10
Harry Wolter	1914–1915	20–18–2
Patsy O'Rourke	1912–1913	30–20–3
Bobby McHale	1911	9–9–1
Tom Kelly	1908–1910	41–18
Jimmy Byrnes	1906–1907	19–7–2
Wallace Bray	1905	11–8
Nick Williams	1904	11–6–1
Joe Corbett; Charlie Graham	1902–1903	20–12–2
Charlie Graham	1901	6–4–1
Billy Hulen	1900	9–5
Jay Hughes; Joe Corbett	1899	10–4
Joe Corbett	1898	9–0
Billy Hulen	1897	6–5
Unknown	1883–1896	–

== Season results ==
Season	Overall Record	Conference	Conference Record	Postseason
2020	12-5*	WCC	N/A	Season ended by COVID-19
2019	12–40	WCC	5–22 (10th)	
2018	26–26	WCC	12–15 (t-6th)	
2017	13–40	WCC	9–18 (7th)	
2016	23–29	WCC	10–17 (9th)	
2015	26–28	WCC	12–15 (7th)	
2014	26–30	WCC	16–11 (t-4th)	WCC baseball tournament
2013	14–39	WCC	1–23 (10th)	
2012	26–28	WCC	5–19 (9th)	
2011	17–34	WCC	4–17 (8th Place)	
2010	23–31	WCC	8–13 (t5th)	
2009	19–34	WCC	6–15 (8th)	
2008	33–22	WCC	13–8 (3rd)	
2007	27–29	WCC	9–12 (8th)	
2006	28–26	WCC	9–12 (t5th)	
2005	28–28	WCC West	11–19 (3rd)	
2004	27–29	WCC West	16–14 (2nd)	
2003	31–26	WCC Coast	21–9 (2nd)	
2002	25–30	WCC Coast	15–14 (2nd)	
2001	23–33	WCC Coast	17–13 (t1st)	
2000	22–37	WCC Coast	12–18 (3rd)	
1999	20–36	WCC West	11–19 (4th)	
1998	27–26	WCC	16–14 (5th)	
1997	41–20	WCC	23–5 (1st)	NCAA Regional
1996	40–22	WCC	22–6 (1st)	NCAA Play-In
1995	35–20–1	WCC	22–7–1 (2nd)	
1994	40–20	WCC	21–9 (1st)	NCAA Regional
1993	27–29–1	WCC	16–14 (3rd)	
1992	23–32	WCC	14–16 (3rd)	
1991	34–25	WCC	20–18 (4th)	
1990	26–30–1	WCC	17–19 (4th)	
1989	40–22	WCC	14–10 (3rd)	
1988	43–18–1	WCC	18–5–1 (2nd)	NCAA Regional
1987	25–30–2	WCAC	11–12–1 (3rd)	
1986	26–31	WCAC	10–12 (4th)	
1985	33–25	WCAC	13–11 (3rd)	
1984	29–31	NCBA	15–15 (3rd)	
1983	32–25	NCBA	15–15 (4th)	
1982	36–26–1	NCBA	26–10 (1st)	
1981	28–33	NCBA	15–21 (5th)	
1980	25–30	NCBA	12–21 (5th)	
1979	27–22	NCBA	18–17 (4th)	
1978	40–23	NCBA	24–12 (1st)	NCAA District 8
1977	26–26	NCBA	18–16 (4th)	
1976	27–23	WCAC	6–11 (4th)	
1975	39–16	WCAC	13–5 (2nd)	
1974	38–17	WCAC	12–6 (2nd)	
1973	35–16	WCAC	13–5 (2nd)	
1972	42–13	WCAC	18–2 (1st)	NCAA District 8
1971	43–13	WCAC	18–2 (1st)	NCAA District 8
1970	42–16	WCAC	18–2 (1st)	NCAA District 8
1969	40–10	WCAC	16–4 (1st)	NCAA District 8
1968	31–12	WCAC	15–5 (1st)	NCAA District 8
1967	24–14	–	–	
1966	27–17	CIBA	7–13 (5th)	
1965	29–11	CIBA	11–9 (3rd)	
1964	28–8	CIBA	16–4 (2nd)	
1963	20–16	CIBA	9–7 (2nd)	
1962	39–8	CIBA	12–4 (1st)	College World Series Final
1961	15–12	CIBA	5–11 (4th)	
1960	16–19	CIBA	6–10 (3rd)	
1959	23–13			
1958	18–16			
1957	5–23			
1956	6–22			
1955	11–19			
1954	14–13			
1953	14–15			
1952	18–12			
1951	12–4			
1950	18–8			
1949	17–10			
1948	15–11			
1947	10–15			
1946	4–8			
1945	WWII			
1944	WWII			
1943	12–8			
1942	18–7			
1941	7–11			
1940	14–7			
1939	5–18			
1938	5–14			
1937	3–17			
1936	5–16			
1935	8–14			
1934	NA			
1933	5–11			
1932	12–6–1			
1931	8–13–1			
1930	6–10–1			
1929	19–3–1			
1928	7–3			
1927	5–13			
1926	8–12			
1925	8–12			
1924	8–8			
1923	1–13–1			
1922	7–2–1			
1921	5–9–1			
1920	1–13–1			
1919	7–2–1			
1918	3–4			
1917	9–8			
1916	6–10			
1915	10–9			
1914	10–9–2			
1913	12–11–2			
1912	18–9–1			
1911	9–9–1			
1910	21–5			
1909	10–6			
1908	10–7			
1907	10–3–2			
1906	9–4			
1905	11–8			
1904	11–6–1			
1903	10–9–1			
1902	10–3–1			
1901	6–4–1			
1900	9–5			
1899	10–4			
1898	9–0			
1897	6–5			
1896	Unknown			
1895	Unknown			
1894	Unknown			
1893	Unknown			
1892	Unknown			
1891	Unknown			
1890	Unknown			
1889	Unknown			
1888	Unknown			
1887	Unknown			
1886	Unknown			
1885	Unknown			
1884	Unknown			
1883	Unknown			

== Awards ==
=== All-Americans ===
Season	Athlete	Team
2008	Dane Smith	Freshman
2007	Tommy Medica	Freshman
2006	Matt Long	Freshman
2006	Matt Wickswat	Freshman
2004	Anthony Rea	Second
2003	Patrick Overholt	Freshman
2003	Joe Diefenderfer	Honorable Mention
2003	Scott Dierks	Honorable Mention
2002	Joey Gomes	First
1998	Bill Mott	Honorable Mention
1997	Mike Frank	First
1997	Todd Hughes	Freshman
1996	Brian Carmody	First
1994	Karl Thompson	Second
1994	Mike Frank	Freshman
1993	Karl Thompson	Freshman
1992	James Eidam	Freshman
1989	Ed Giovanola	First
1988	Troy Buckley	Second
1988	Wes Bliven	Academic
1987	Wes Bliven	Academic
1986	Wes Bliven	Academic
1974	Gene Deylon	First
1972	Bruce Bochte	Second
1971	Rich Troedson	Second
1968	Vince Bigone	First
1965	Ray Henningson	Second
1964	Tim Cullen	Second
1962	Ernie Fazio	First
1962	Bob Garibaldi	Second
1962	John Boccabella	Second
1959	Jim O'Rourke	First
1956	John Russo	First
1949	Bill Renna	First

=== Conference award winners ===
Season	Athlete	Conference	Team
2011	Cory Hall	WCC	All-WCC First Team
2011	Patrick Terry	WCC	All-WCC Honorable Mention
2011	Kyle DeMerritt	WCC	All-Freshman Team
2011	Patrick Terry	WCC	Rawlings WCC Player of the Week 5/23/11
2011	Curtis Wagner	WCC	All-Academic Team
2011	Brock Simon	WCC	All-Academic Honorable Mention
2011	Paul Twining	WCC	All-Academic Honorable Mention
2011	Joe Supple	WCC	All-Academic Honorable Mention
2010	Tommy Medica	WCC	All-WCC First Team; Preseason All-Conference Team; Rawlings WCC Player of the Week 5/4/10 and 6/1/10
2010	Geoff Klein	WCC	All-WCC First Team; Preseason All-Conference Team; Rawlings WCC Player of the Week 3/16/10
2010	Evan Peters	WCC	All-WCC Honorable Mention
2010	Matt Ozanne	WCC	All-WCC Honorable Mention; All-Freshman Team
2010	Ryan Rieger	WCC	All-WCC Honorable Mention; All-Freshman Team
2010	Alex Rivers	WCC	Rawlings WCC Pitcher of the Week 4/13/10
2009	Nate Garcia	WCC	All-WCC First Team; Rawlings WCC Pitcher of the Week 2/23/09 and 3/9/09
2009	Jon Karcich	WCC	All-WCC First Team
2009	Geoff Klein	WCC	All-WCC First Team
2009	Andrew Biancardi	WCC	All-Freshman Team
2009	Matt Long	WCC	All-Freshman Honorable Mention; Rawlings WCC Player of the Week 5/11/09
2009	Alex Rivers	WCC	Rawlings WCC Pitcher of the Week 3/23/09
2008	Brady Fuerst	WCC	All-WCC First Team
2008	Nate Garcia	WCC	All-WCC First Team
2008	Jon Karcich	WCC	All-WCC First Team
2008	Evan LeBlanc	WCC	All-WCC First Team
2008	Tommy Medica	WCC	All-WCC First Team
2008	Thain Simon	WCC	All-WCC First Team; WCC Freshman of the Year; All-Freshman Team
2007	Tommy Medica	WCC	All-WCC First Team; All-Freshman Team
2007	Nate Garcia	WCC	All-Freshman Team
2007	Steve Kalush	WCC	All-Freshman Team
2007	Alex Rivers	WCC	All-Freshman Team
2006	Kris Watts	WCC	All-WCC First Team
2006	Daniel Nava	WCC	All-WCC First Team
2006	Matt Wickswat	WCC	All-WCC Second Team; All-Freshman Team
2006	Matt Long	WCC	All-WCC Second Team; All-Freshman Team
2006	Brady Fuerst	WCC	All-Freshman Team
2005	Kevin Drever	WCC	All-WCC First Team
2005	Anthony Rea	WCC	All-WCC First Team
2005	Eric Newton	WCC	All-WCC Honorable Mention
2005	Kris Watts	WCC	All-WCC Honorable Mention
2004	Ryan Chiarelli	WCC	All-WCC First Team
2004	Anthony Rea	WCC	All-WCC First Team; All-Academic Team
2004	Michael Thompson	WCC	All-WCC First Team
2004	Nic Crosta	WCC	All-WCC First Team
2004	Kellan McConnell	WCC	All-WCC Honorable Mention
2004	Robert Perry	WCC	All-WCC Honorable Mention
2004	Will Thompson	WCC	All-WCC Honorable Mention
2004	Nic Crosta	WCC	Rawlings WCC Player of the Week 4/26/04
2004	Robert Perry	WCC	Rawlings WCC Player of the Week 5/17/04
2003	Joe Diefenderfer	WCC	All-WCC First Team
2003	Scott Dierks	WCC	All-WCC First Team; WCC Player of the Year
2003	A.J. LaBarbera	WCC	All-WCC Second Team
2003	Jack Headley	WCC	All-WCC Second Team
2002	Joey Gomes	WCC	All-WCC First Team
2001	Jack Headley	WCC	All-WCC First Team
2001	Matt Queen	WCC	All-WCC Second Team
2001	Joe Diefenderfer	WCC	All-WCC Second Team
2000	Jack Headley	WCC	All-WCC Second Team; WCC Freshman of the Year; All-Freshman Team
1998	Bill Mott	WCC	All-WCC First Team
1998	Ryan Bulich	WCC	All-WCC First Team
1997	Paul Chiaffredo	WCC	All-WCC First Team
1997	Bill Mott	WCC	All-WCC First Team
1997	Mike Frank	WCC	WCC Player of the Year; All-WCC First Team; Rawlings WCC 40th Anniversary Baseball Team
1997	Tobin Lanzetta	WCC	All-WCC First Team
1997	Jeff Perry	WCC	All-WCC First Team
1996	Ross Parmenter	WCC	WCC Player of the Year; All-WCC First Team
1996	Bill Mott	WCC	All-WCC First Team
1996	Brian Carmody	WCC	WCC Pitcher of the Year; All-WCC First Team
1996	Mike McDonald	WCC	All-WCC First Team
1996	Mike Frank	WCC	WCC Player of the Year; All-WCC First Team
1995	Karl Thompson	WCC	All-WCC First Team
1995	Ross Parmenter	WCC	All-WCC First Team
1995	Mike Frank	WCC	All-WCC First Team
1995	Randy Winn	WCC	All-WCC First Team
1995	Bob Pailthorpe	WCC	All-WCC First Team; WCC Pitcher of the Year; Rawlings WCC 40th Anniversary Baseball Team
1994	Lou Donati	WCC	All-WCC First Team
1994	Tommy Thompson	WCC	All-WCC First Team
1994	Jeff Frankel	WCC	All-WCC First Team
1994	Karl Thompson	WCC	WCC Player of the Year; All-WCC First Team
1994	Mike Frank	WCC	All-WCC First Team; WCC Freshman of the Year; All-Freshman Team
1994	Bob Pailthorpe	WCC	All-WCC First Team; WCC Pitcher of the Year
1994	Ken Lorge	WCC	All-WCC First Team
1993	Nick Mirizzi	WCC	All-WCC First Team
1992	Nick Mirizzi	WCC	All-WCC First Team
1991	David Tuttle	WCC	All-WCC First Team; WCC Pitcher of the Year
1991	Adam Melhuse	WCC	WCC Freshman of the Year
1989	Ed Giovanola	WCC	All-WCC First Team
1989	Matt Toole	WCC	All-WCC First Team
1989	Greg Gohr	WCC	All-WCC First Team
1988	Troy Buckley	WCAC	All-WCAC First Team; Rawlings WCC 40th Anniversary Baseball Team
1988	Matt Toole	WCAC	All-WCAC First Team
1988	Jeff Healy	WCAC	All-WCAC First Team
1988	Wes Bliven	WCAC	WCAC Player of the Year
1985	Sal Vaccaro	WCAC	All-WCC First Team
1984	Jeff Melrose	NCBA	All-NCBA First Team
1984	Rich Martig	NCBA	All-NCBA First Team
1983	Kent Cooper	NCBA	All-NCBA First Team
1983	Ron Hansen	NCBA	All-NCBA First Team
1982	Dave Oliva	NCBA	NCBA Player of the Year; All-NCBA First Team
1982	Kevin McKenna	NCBA	All-NCBA First Team
1981	Gary Davenport	NCBA	All-NCBA First Team
1978	Sean Everton	NCBA	All-NCBA First Team
1978	Frank Convertino	NCBA	All-NCBA First Team
1978	Skeeter Rivas	NCBA	All-NCBA First Team
1978	Rick Foley	NCBA	All-NCBA First Team
1977	George Hahn	NCBA	All-NCBA First Team
1977	Rick Foley	NCBA	All-NCBA First Team; NCBA Pitcher of the Year
1976	George Hahn	NCBA	All-NCBA First Team
1976	Gordon Hahn	NCBA	All-NCBA First Team
1975	Gordon Hahn	NCBA	All-NCBA First Team
1975	Steve Kelley	NCBA	All-NCBA First Team
1974	Gene Deylon	WCAC	WCAC Player of the Year; All-WCAC First Team
1974	Jim Wilhelm	WCAC	All-WCAC First Team
1974	Ron Mosely	WCAC	All-WCAC First Team
1974	Chris Kinsel	WCAC	All-WCAC First Team
1974	Dave Judnick	WCAC	All-WCAC First Team
1973	Mike Denevi	WCAC	All-WCAC First Team
1973	Gene Delyon	WCAC	All-WCAC First Team
1973	Walt Kaczmarek	WCAC	All-WCAC First Team
1972	Rich Troedson	WCAC	WCAC Player of the Year; All-WCAC First Team; Rawlings WCC 40th Anniversary Baseball Team
1972	Lou Caviglia	WCAC	All-WCAC First Team
1971	Duane Larson	WCAC	WCAC Player of the Year: All-WCAC First Team
1971	Lou Caviglia	WCAC	All-WCAC First Team
1971	Rusty Weeks	WCAC	All-WCAC First Team
1971	Rich Troedson	WCAC	All-WCAC First Team
1971	Joe Pupo	WCAC	All-WCAC First Team
1970	Duane Larson	WCAC	WCAC Player of the Year; All-WCAC First Team
1970	Mike McMonigle	WCAC	All-WCAC First Team
1970	Kurt Lohrke	WCAC	All-WCAC First Team
1970	Bruce Bochte	WCAC	All-WCAC First Team
1970	Don Paxton	WCAC	All-WCAC First Team
1970	Rich Troedson	WCAC	All-WCAC First Team
1969	Leo Rippo	WCAC	All-WCAC First Team
1969	Hank Mott	WCAC	All-WCAC First Team
1969	Bill McMonigle	WCAC	All-WCAC First Team
1969	Vince Bigone	WCAC	All-WCAC First Team
1969	Rich Troedson	WCAC	All-WCAC First Team
1968	Alvin Strange	WCAC	All-WCAC First Team
1968	Fred Ott	WCAC	All-WCAC First Team
1968	Albert Strane	WCAC	All-WCAC First Team
1968	Rod Pommes	WCAC	All-WCAC First Team
1968	Vince Bigone	WCAC	All-WCAC First Team

== In the Pros ==
=== Former Major Leaguer Baseball Players ===
- Lou Berberet (New York Yankees)
- John Boccabella (Chicago Cubs)
- Bruce Bochte (Los Angeles Angels)
- Nelson Briles (St. Louis Cardinals)
- Scott Chiamparino (Texas Rangers)
- Victor Cole (Pittsburgh Pirates)
- Mike Crudale (St. Louis Cardinals)
- Tim Cullen (Washington Senators)
- Jan Dukes (Washington Senators)
- Ernie Fazio (Colt .45’s)
- Mike Frank (Cincinnati Reds)
- Al Gallagher (San Francisco Giants)
- Bob Garibaldi (San Francisco Giants)
- Ed Giovanola (Atlanta Braves)
- Greg Gohr (Detroit Tigers)
- Pat Jacquez (Chicago White Sox)
- Pat Larkin (San Francisco Giants)
- Larry Loughlin (Philadelphia Phillies)
- Mike Macfarlane (Kansas City Royals)
- Pete Magrini (Boston Red Sox)
- Adam Melhuse (Los Angeles Dodgers)
- Fran Mullins (Chicago White Sox)
- Jim O’Rourke (St. Louis Cardinals)
- Bill Renna (New York Yankees)
- Rich Robertson (San Francisco Giants)
- Roger Samuels (San Francisco Giants)
- Bob Spence (Chicago White Sox)
- Elmer Stricklett
- Rich Troedson (San Diego Padres)
- Jim Wilhelm (San Diego Padres)
- Randy Winn (Tampa Bay Rays)

NOTE: Team listed in parentheses is the Major League Baseball team they played for during their professional debut.

=== Current Minor League Baseball players ===
- Daniel Nava: Pawtucket Red Sox – Triple-A International League (Boston Red Sox)
- Kris Watts: Altoona Curve – Double-A Eastern League (Pittsburgh Pirates)
- Matt Long: Inland Empire 66ers – Class A Advanced California League (LA Angels)
- Jon Karcich: Inland Empire 66ers – Class A Advanced California League (LA Angels)
- Mark Willinsky: Brevard County Manatees – Class A Florida League (Milwaukee Brewers)
- Matt Wickswat: Winston-Salem Dash – Class A Advanced Carolina League (Chi. White Sox)
- Evan LeBlanc: Savannah Sand Gnats – Class A South Atlantic League (NY Mets)
- Nate Garcia: Bowling Green Hot Rods – Class A Midwest League (Tampa Bay Rays)
- Geoff Klein: Quad Cities River Bandits – Class A Midwest League (St. Louis Cardinals)
- Tommy Medica: Fort Wayne TinCaps – Class A Midwest League (San Diego Padres)
- Alex Rivers: Idaho Falls Chukars – Rookie Pioneer League (Kansas City Royals)
- J.R. Graham: Danville Braves- Appalachian Rookie League (Atlanta Braves)
- Patrick Terry: Chico Outlaws- North American Baseball American League (Independent)

=== Broncos in the MLB draft ===
Year	Round	Pick	Player	Position	Team
2010	39	1169	Alex Rivers	P	Kansas City Royals
2010	16	491	Nate Garcia	P	Tampa Bay Rays
2010	15	469	Geoff Klein	C	St. Louis Cardinals
2010	14	424	Tommy Medica	C / OF	San Diego Padres
2008	30	921	Matt Long	OF	Los Angeles Angels
2008	23	704	Evan LeBlanc	OF	New York Mets
2008	19	570	Justin Kuehn	P	Chicago White Sox
2008	15	458	Mark Willinsky	P	Milwaukee Brewers
2006	33	992	Eric Newton	2B	Milwaukee Brewers
2006	28	851	Dustin Realini	3B	Cleveland Indians
2006	16	470	Kris Watts	C	Pittsburgh Pirates
2005	40	1208	Thomas Van Buskirk	P	Texas Rangers
2005	26	794	Michael Thompson	3B	Houston Astros
2005	22	667	Patrick Overholt	P	Philadelphia Phillies
2004	47	1395	Kellan McConnell	P	Texas Rangers
2004	17	501	Nick Crosta	OF	Texas Rangers
2004	7	220	Will Thompson	1B	San Francisco Giants
2003	36	1069	Jim Wallace	C	New York Mets
2003	32	938	Matt Travis	P	Tampa Bay Rays
2003	24	713	Scott Dierks	OF	Florida Marlins
2003	19	565	Joe Diefenderfer	P	Philadelphia Phillies
2002	33	1001	Pat Peavey	3B / SS	Houston Astros
2002	8	224	Joey Gomes	OF	Tampa Bay Rays
2000	33	988	Tommy Callen	2B	Toronto Blue Jays
1999	37	1132	Kevin Okimoto	1B	San Diego Padres
1999	24	732	Mike Crudale	P	St. Louis Cardinals
1998	11	331	William Mott	OF	Los Angeles Angels
1997	24	736	Tobin Lazetta	P	Montreal Expos
1997	7	218	Mike Frank	OF	Cincinnati Reds
1997	6	179	Paul Chiaffredo	C	Toronto Blue Jays
1996	24	703	Ross Parmenter	SS	Milwaukee Brewers
1996	7	200	Brian Carmody	P	San Diego Padres
1995	10	261	Bob Palithrope	P	Florida Marlins
1995	6	164	Karl Thompson	C	Seattle Mariners
1995	3	65	Randy Winn	OF	Florida Marlins
1994	11	304	Bob Palithrope	P	Houston Astros
1994	4	99	Tom Mott	P	Minnesota Twins
1993	33	937	Randy Ortega	C	Oakland Athletics
1993	23	635	Brooks Drysdale	P	Los Angeles Angels
1992	40	1127	Mark Fabela	P	Pittsburgh Pirates
1991	6	172	Dave Tuttle	P	Cincinnati Reds
1990	27	719	Tom Hotchkiss	P	Toronto Blue Jays
1990	7	178	Ed Giovanola	SS	Atlanta Braves
1989	30	778	Matt Toole	SS	San Diego Padres
1989	29	764	Craig Middlekauff	OF / 1B	Detroit Tigers
1989	9	241	Troy Buckley	C	Minnesota Twins
1989	1	21	Greg Gohr	P	Detroit Tigers
1988	26	663	Wes Bliven	P	Los Angeles Angels
1988	14	361	Victor Cole	P	Kansas City Royals
1987	54	1197	Wes Bliven	P	Toronto Blue Jays
1987	15	391	Gary Maasberg	3B	Philadelphia Phillies
1987	4	95	Scott Chiamparino	P	Oakland Athletics
1986	16	410	John Savage	P	Cincinnati Reds
1986	9	213	Ray Williamson	OF	Cleveland Indians
1985	2^	38	Rich Martig	3B	Oakland Athletics
1985	27	679	David Blakely	P	San Francisco Giants
1985	18	461	Sal Vaccaro	P	Kansas City Royals
1985	8	195	Ray Williamson	OF	Oakland Athletics
1985	4	97	Mike Macfarlane	C	Kansas City Royals
1984	34	766	Rich Martig	INF	Cleveland Indians
1984	24	612	Chuck Martin	P	Atlanta Braves
1984	24	607	Sal Vaccaro	P	Montreal Expos
1984	24	600	Ward Merdes	P	Cleveland Indians
1984	23	583	Jeff Melrose	1B / OF	Texas Rangers
1984	23	581	Kent Cooper	OF	San Francisco Giants
1983	26	640	Ron Hansen	C	Texas Rangers
1983	10	244	Rogers Samuels	C	Texas Rangers
1982	17	430	Kevin Walters	C	Philadelphia Phillies
1982	10	254	Dave Oliva	OF	Boston Red Sox
1982	4	97	Lloyd Martin	P	Montreal Expos
1981	27	675	Gary Davenport	2B	San Francisco Giants
1981	25	625	Joey Balderston	P	San Diego Padres
1981	16	392	Rick Sundberg	C	Los Angeles Angels
1981	7	177	Mike Beuder	P	Los Angeles Dodgers
1980	27	664	Jeff Walsh	P	San Diego Padres
1980	12	228	Sean Everton	OF	Toronto Blue Jays
1979	34	810	Jeff Walsh	P	Cleveland Indians
1979	22	551	Rickey Edwards	P	Cleveland Indians
1979	20	519	Sean Everton	OF	New York Yankees
1979	3	61	Fran Mullins	SS	Chicago White Sox
1978	27	638	Kevin Kirby	P	Chicago Cubs
1978	22	550	Ray Rivas	INF	St. Louis Cardinals
1978	5	118	Rick Foley	P	Los Angeles Angels
1978	3	64	Fran Mullins	SS	Detroit Tigers
1977	14	347	Glenn Hollands	P	Texas Rangers
1977	12	294	George Hahn	C	San Diego Padres
1977	10	253	Russ Brett	3B	Baltimore Orioles
1977	3	60	Rick Foley	P	San Diego Padres
1976	9	208	Gordon Hahn	2B	New York Yankees
1976	6	130	Bill Harris	P	Minnesota Twins
1975	2^	34	Mike Denevi	SS	Milwaukee Brewers
1975	1*	18	Mike Denevi	SS	Kansas City Royals
1975	17	387	Mike Bartell	SS	Detroit Tigers
1975	6	121	Steve Kelley	P	Los Angeles Angels
1974	5^	70	Walt Kaczmarek	P	Philadelphia Phillies
1974	1^	5	Gene Delyon	3B	New York Yankees
1974	1*	9	Gene Delyon	3B	San Diego Padres
1974	10	218	Tim Ryan	P	Philadelphia Phillies
1974	7	145	Jim Wilhelm	1B / OF	San Diego Padres
1974	6	126	Mike Denevi	SS	Milwaukee Brewers
1973	25	559	Gene Delyon	3B	Texas Rangers
1973	18	409	Walt Kaczmarek	P	Texas Rangers
1973	5	119	Charles Staniland	P	Oakland Athletics
1972	1^	6	Rich Troedson	P	San Diego Padres
1972	2	34	Bruce Bochte	1B / OF	Los Angeles Angels
1971	3*	68	Paul Bagnasco	3B	New York Mets
1971	3*	53	Joe Pupo	P	Baltimore Orioles
1971	3*	51	Kurt Lohrke	SS	Boston Red Sox
1971	1*	8	Rich Troedson	P	Houston Astros
1971	33	700	Charles Franklin	3B	Philadelphia Phillies
1971	22	514	Stephen Chipp	P	Oakland Athletics
1971	17	384	Duane Larson	2B	San Diego Padres
1970	7^	138	Mel Bannon	SS	Minnesota Twins
1970	2^	25	Bill Borelli	1B	Washington Senators
1970	53	902	James Cavilglia	C	Pittsburgh Pirates
1970	21	482	Bill Borelli	1B	Washington Senators
1969	6^	124	Mike Sigman	P	New York Mets
1969	5^	105	Vince Bigone	OF / 3B	New York Mets
1969	47	949	Albert Strane	OF	Seattle Pilots
1969	45	932	Bill Borelli	OF / 1B	Montreal Expos
1969	36	826	James McClain	P	Montreal Expos
1968	9*	136	Vince Bigone	OF	New York Mets
1968	7*	126	Mike Sigman	P	New York Mets
1968	28	618	Alvin Strane	2B	Los Angeles Dodgers
1968	27	596	Albert Strane	SS	Los Angeles Dodgers
1968	21	473	Rod Pommes	OF / 3B	Chicago White Sox
1968	17	378	Richard Lang	OF	Philadelphia Phillies
1967	7	119	Frank Austin	OF	Los Angeles Angels
1967	4	79	John Mispagel	C	New York Mets
1967	3	48	Ray Henningsen	2B	Washington Senators
1967	3	46	Seaton Daly	C	Los Angeles Angels
1967	1	8	Jan Dukes	P	Washington Senators
1967	1^	4	Bob Spence	1B / OF	San Francisco Giants
1967	11^	177	Robert Walter	P	Baltimore Orioles
1967	8^	140	James Townsend	INF / OF	Minnesota Twins
1967	5^	91	Vince Bigone	OF / 3B	Chicago White Sox
1967	3^	52	Doug Carson	C	Pittsburgh Pirates
1967	3^	45	Rod Austin	OF	Boston Red Sox
1967	2	25	Ray Henningsen	2B	Boston Red Sox
1966	6*	95	Rod Austin	OF	New York Mets
1966	4*	63	Ray Henningsen	2B	Chicago Cubs
1966	45	760	John Mispagel	C	New York Mets
1966	35	658	Robert Walter	P	New York Mets
1966	27	523	Bruce Carmichael	INF	Chicago Cubs
1966	26	510	Seaton Daly	C	Cleveland Indians
1966	5	96	Jan Dukes	P	Baltimore Orioles
1966	4	67	Bob Spence	1B	St. Louis Cardinals
1965	18	350	Rod Austin	OF	Los Angeles Dodgers
1965	14	273	Ray Henningsen	2B	St. Louis Cardinals
1965	14	272	Howard Martin	OF	San Francisco Giants
1965	5	92	Rich Robertson	P	San Francisco Giants
1965	1	14	Alan Gallagher	3B	San Francisco Giants

- * indicates June Secondary Draft
- ^ indicates January Secondary Draft

== See also ==
- List of NCAA Division I baseball programs
