= Ed Grier =

American academic

- Born: February 15, 1955 (age 71); Atlanta, Georgia
- Education: Duquesne University (B.Acc.)
- Occupations: Dean, Santa Clara University Leavey School of Business(July 2021 - December 2025)

Edward Arthur Grier (born February 15, 1955) was the dean of the Santa Clara University Leavey School of Business. Before coming to SCU, he was the dean at Virginia Commonwealth University, and before that, he was an executive at The Walt Disney Company.

== Education and early career ==
He has a bachelor's degree in accounting from Duquesne University in Pittsburgh, Pennsylvania.

A certified public accountant, Grier worked for Ernst & Young.

== Career at Disney ==
Before transitioning to higher ed, Grier spent 29 years with the Walt Disney Company. He joined The Walt Disney Company in 1981 as senior auditor at Walt Disney World in Florida.

Grier held executive positions at the Walt Disney World Resort in Florida and At the Florida resort, he served as general manager for the operation lines of business at the Epcot and Disney-MGM Studios theme parks.

In the early 1990s, Grier served as a member of an expatriate team that was assigned to Disneyland Resort Paris in France for one year. While there, Grier was establishing the resort's marketing division and developing Pan-European marketing strategies.

Grier served as executive managing director of Walt Disney Attractions Japan, where he supervised Disney operations for the Tokyo Disney Resort and the day-to-day relationship with the Oriental Land Company, which owns the property.

Grier joined Disneyland Resort in July 2006 (replacing Matt Ouimet). He reported to Al Weiss, president of operations for Walt Disney Parks and Resorts. As president of Disneyland Resort in Anaheim, California, properties under his purview included: Disneyland and Disney California Adventure Park theme parks, the Disneyland Hotel, Disney's Grand Californian Hotel & Spa, Disney's Paradise Pier Hotel, and the Downtown Disney retail, dining and entertainment district.

Grier announced his retirement from the company on October 5, 2009.

== Career at VCU Business School and SCU Leavey School of Business ==
Grier was named dean of the Virginia Commonwealth University School of Business on February 8, 2010. On May 2, 2017, he took on an interim role as university’s "vice president for development and alumni relations.". He would serve in that role until the hiring of the new vice president, which was expected in the Summer of 2017.

On April 6, 2021, Grier announced that he would be leaving VCU in June 2021 to become the new dean of the business school at Santa Clara University.

On May 27, 2025, Grier announced that he would step down from his role as the dean of Leavey School of Business at Santa Clara University at the end of December 2025 and continue in a consultative capacity through June 2026.
