= Stephen Schott Stadium =

Baseball stadium in Santa Clara, California

Coordinates: 37°20′55″N 121°55′54″W

- Schott Stadium
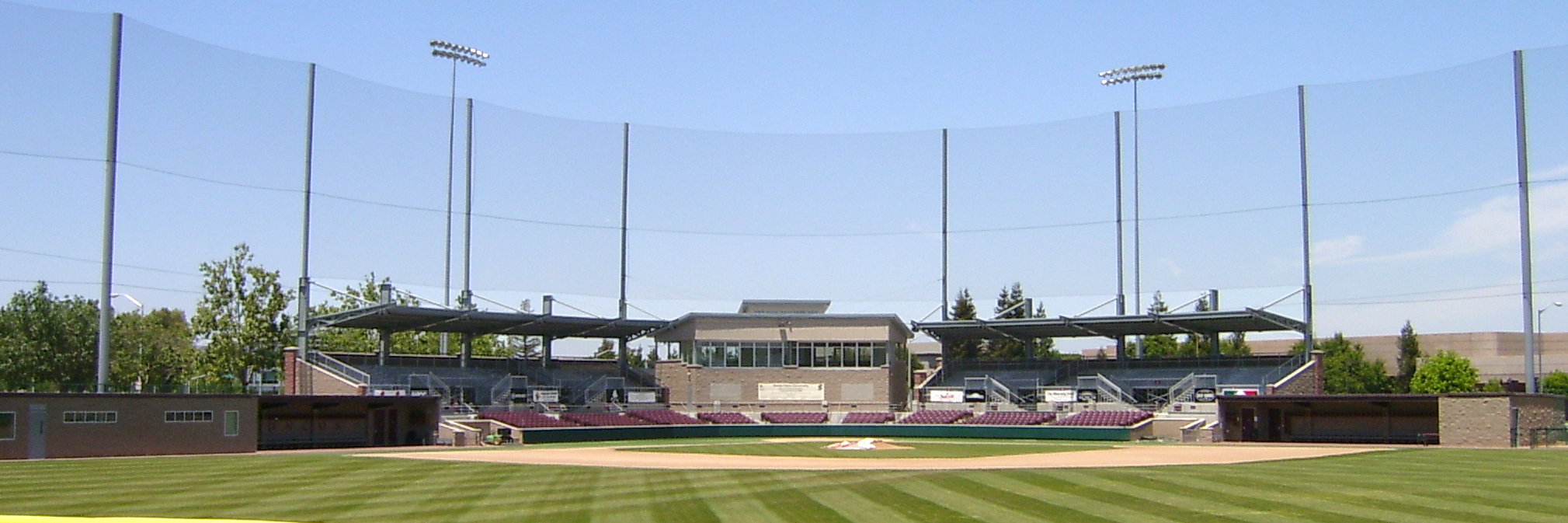
- Interactive map of Stephen Schott Stadium
- Location: El Camino Real at Campbell Ave, Santa Clara, California 95053
- Owner: Santa Clara University
- Operator: Santa Clara University
- Capacity: 1,500 (Baseball)
- Surface: Fieldturf
- Field size: Left Field - 340 ft (100 m); Center Field - 402 ft (123 m); Right-Center Power Alleys - 395 ft (120 m); Right Field - 330 ft (100 m); Backstop - 30 ft (9.1 m)

Construction
- Groundbreaking: January 2004
- Opened: April 30, 2005
- Cost: 8.6 million USD
- Architect: HOK Sport

Tenant
- Santa Clara Broncos baseball (NCAA Division I WCC) (2005-present)

Stephen Schott Stadium, or Schott Stadium for short, is the home of the Santa Clara University baseball team, a Division I Baseball team of the NCAA's West Coast Conference. The stadium, which opened in 2005, is located in Santa Clara, California, USA.

== Stadium history ==
A new baseball stadium for the Santa Clara University Broncos was first conceived of in January 2004 when Stephen Schott, noted 1960 alumnus, baseball enthusiast and, at the time, owner of the Oakland Athletics, announced he was donating $4 million to project. The Santa Clara University baseball team had been playing in 6,800 seat, multipurpose Buck Shaw Stadium, which they shared with the soccer team and, until 1993, the football team. Lack of space on the university's side of El Camino Real (Route 82) forced SCU to build the stadium across the street. It was built in approximately one year, but did not open in time for the 2005 baseball season as originally planned due to cost overruns and weather-related delays. Instead, it opened on April 30, 2005, to a sold-out game between Santa Clara University and Gonzaga University. The final cost of the stadium was $8.6 million.

The stadium hosted a Super Regional tournament between Dallas Baptist University and California June 11–13, 2011. The neutral site was selected since neither school has an adequate on-campus facility to host the best-of-three series.

=== 2011 Santa Clara Super Regional ===
Game	Date	Host	Result	Visitor	Note
1	June 11, 2011	California	7–0	Dallas Baptist	California leads series 1–0
2	June 12, 2011	California	6–2	Dallas Baptist	California wins series 2–0
3	June 13, 2011	California	—	Dallas Baptist	Third game not necessary

- California hosted the super regional at Santa Clara because its own stadium (Evans Diamond) could not accommodate television crews and did not have lights.

== Stadium design ==
The stadium features a grass playing surface in the infield and outfield, a Fieldturf foul territory to keep maintenance costs down. Schott Stadium seats 1,500. The upper rows of the stadium consist of bench type bleachers with backs while the lower rows consist of tip up seating. A 6,800-square-foot (630 m^{2}) dugout for the home team was added to Schott Stadium. The stadium's 20,000 square feet (1,900 m^{2}) of building space features locker rooms, showers, and a trainer's area for both home and visiting teams. The SCU locker rooms features a team room equipped for live game feeds, team meetings, and press conferences. A VIP Building consists of a full press box, and a luxury suite behind home plate. Two additional buildings on-site consist of a concession and ticket office and a hitting center. The outside of the stadium features a traditional brick facade similar to Camden Yards and other "retro" ballparks.

== See also ==
- List of NCAA Division I baseball venues

Preceded by Buck Shaw Stadium	Home of the Santa Clara University Baseball; 2005 – present	Succeeded by current
