= Barry Posner (leadership scholar) =

American academic and author

Barry Z. Posner
- Born: March 11, 1949 (age 76)
- Occupations: Academic; Author; Public speaker
- Known for: Co-author of The Leadership Challenge

Barry Zane Posner (born March 11, 1949) is the Accolti Professor of Leadership at the Leavey School of Business at Santa Clara University.

== Early life and education ==
Posner received a B.A. degree in political science from the University of California, Santa Barbara in 1970, a M.A. from The Ohio State University in Public Administration in 1972, and a Ph.D in Organizational Behavior and Administrative Theory from the University of Massachusetts, Amherst in 1976;. His doctoral thesis was "Characteristics of individuals' control in organizations"

== Career ==
Posner is the Accolti Professor of Leadership at the Leavey School of Business at Santa Clara University. He also serves on the advisory board of the Global Women's Leadership Network. He has spoken about leadership at the University of St. Thomas. He spent 6 months as visiting professor at the Hong Kong University of Science and Technology. His work has been featured in The Washington Post. His research includes exploring positive leadership traits that lead to successful leaders. He also has studied the key components of successful business projects.

=== The Leadership Challenge ===
Posner and James M. Kouzes started developing the idea for The Leadership Challenge when they were planned to present about leadership at a two-day conference. Academics at Santa Clara University, Kouzes and Posner were set to speak after Tom Peters, who was presenting about successful companies. Kouzes and Posner decided to focus on individual leadership skills. The name for the book came from the concept of the challenges that take place to "make extraordinary things happen," according to Kouzes in 2012. The Leadership Challenge uses case studies to examine "The Five Practices of Exemplary Leadership," as researched and developed by Kouzes and Posner. Their first surveys for the five practices started in 1983, by asking people "What do you do as a leader when you're performing at your personal best?" Over 30 years, they have done thousands of interviews and collected approximately 75,000 written responses. Kouzes and Posner identified five common concepts in their survey, hence the five practices. The "Five Practices" are: "Model the Way," "Inspire a Shared Vision," "Challenge the Process," "Enable Others to Act," and "Encourage the Heart". Posner has published, alongside Kouzes, articles about The Leadership Challenge in Fast Company.

== Bibliography ==
- "A Leadership Development Instrument for Students: Updated". Journal of College Student Development. Volume 45, Number 4, July/August 2004: 443–456.

With James K. Kouzes

- with John C. Maxwell. Christian Reflections on The Leadership Challenge. Hoboken: Jossey-Bass (2004). ISBN 9780787983376
- Encouraging the Heart: A Leader's Guide to Rewarding and Recognizing Others. Hoboken: Jossey-Bass (2003). ISBN 9780787964634
- with Elaine Biech. A Coach's Guide to Developing Exemplary Leaders: Making the Most of The Leadership Challenge and the Leadership Practices Inventory. Hoboken: Pfeiffer (2010)
- Credibility: How Leaders Gain and Lose It, Why People Demand It. Hoboken: Jossey-Bass (1993).
- A Leader's Legacy. Hoboken: Jossey-Bass (2006). ISBN 9780787982966
- The Leadership Challenge: Activities Book. Hoboken: Pfeiffer (2010). ISBN 047047713X
- The Leadership Challenge: How to Make Extraordinary Things Happen in Organizations. Hoboken: Jossey-Bass (2012). ISBN 0470651725
- The Leadership Challenge Workbook. Hoboken: Jossey-Bass (2012). ISBN 9781118182703
- with Elaine Biech. A Coach's Guide to Developing Exemplary Leaders: Making the Most of The Leadership Challenge and the Leadership Practices Inventory (LPI). Hoboken: Pfeiffer (2010). ISBN 9780470377116
- with Steven J. DeKrey. Making Extraordinary Things Happen in Asia: Applying The Five Practices of Exemplary Leadership. Hoboken: Jossey-Bass (2013). ISBN 9781118518519
- The Student Leadership Challenge: Five Practices for Exemplary Leaders. Hoboken: Jossey-Bass (2009). ISBN 0470177055
- with Beth High and Gary M. Morgan. The Student Leadership Challenge: Facilitation and Activity Guide. Hoboken: Jossey-Bass (2013) ISBN 9781118390085
- with Beth High and Gary M. Morgan. The Student Leadership Challenge: Student Workbook and Personal Leadership Journal. Hoboken: Jossey-Bass (2013).
- with Joe Frontiera and Daniel Leidl. Team Turnarounds: A Playbook for Transforming Underperforming Teams. Hoboken: Jossey-Bass (2012).
- The Truth about Leadership: The No-fads, Heart-of-the-Matter Facts You Need to Know. Hoboken: Jossey-Bass (2010). ISBN 0470633549
- "We Lead from the Inside Out," The Journal of Values-Based Leadership: Vol. 1: Iss. 1, Article 5. 2008.
