= Rusty Filter =

American college baseball coach (born 1968)

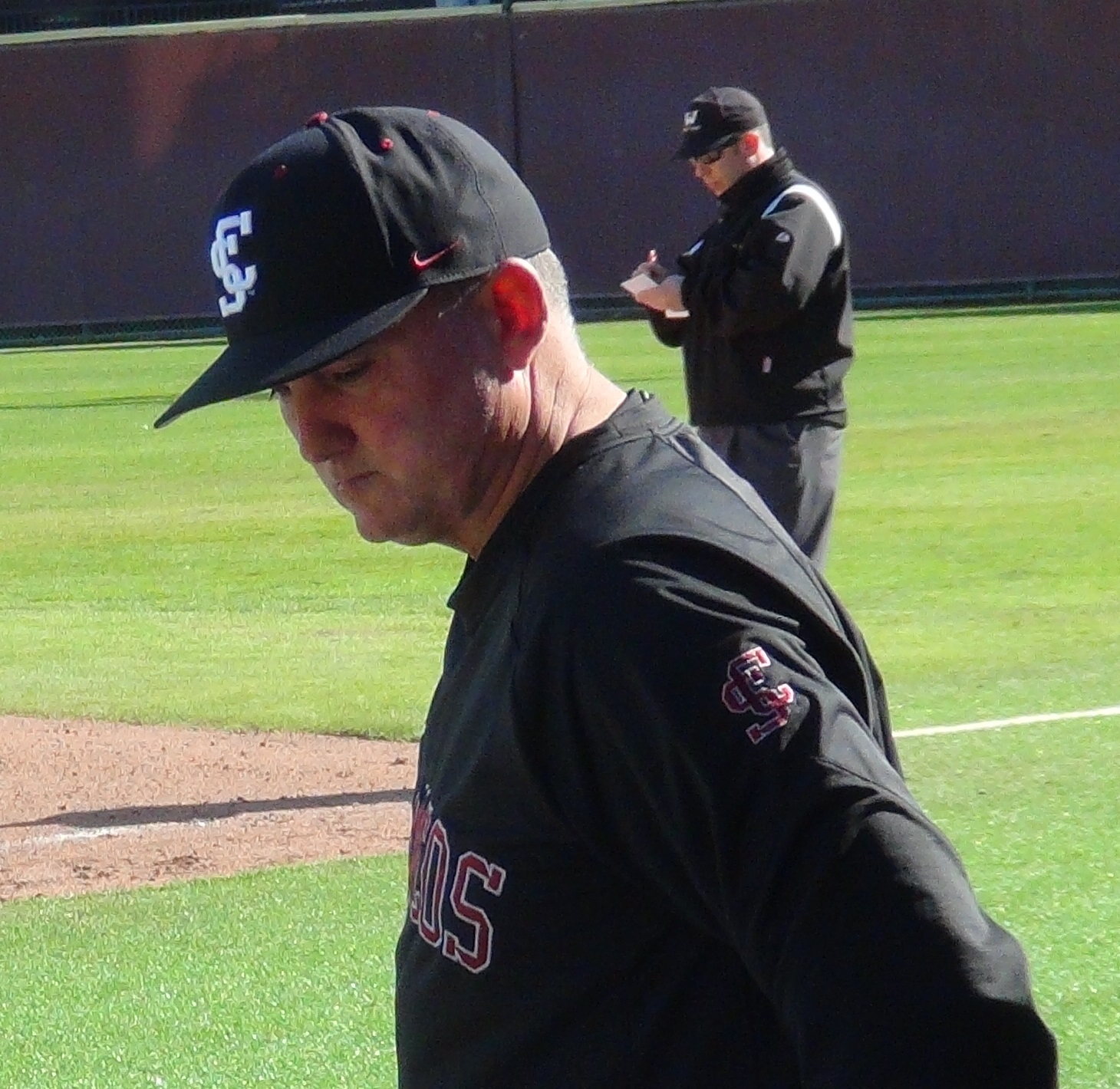
- Filter in 2019.

Current position
- Title: Head coach
- Team: Santa Clara
- Conference: WCC
- Record: 172–209

Biographical details
- Born: November 30, 1968 (age 56); Alameda County, California, U.S.

Playing career
- 1987–1990: San Diego State
- Position(s): Catcher / Pitcher

Coaching career (HC unless noted)
- 1991: San Diego State (asst.)
- 1992–1993: Mission Bay HS (asst.)
- 1994–2009: San Diego State (asst.)
- 2010–2017: Stanford (asst.)
- 2018–present: Santa Clara

Head coaching record
- Overall: 172–209
- Tournaments: WCC: 4–1; NCAA: 1–2

Accomplishments and honors

Championships
- WCC Tournament (2023)

Russell Dean Filter Sr. (born November 30, 1968) is an American college baseball coach and former catcher and pitcher. Filter is the head coach of the Santa Clara Broncos baseball team.

== Playing career ==
Filter attended Mission Bay Senior High School in San Diego, California. Upon graduation from high school, Filter enrolled at San Diego State University. Filter began his college career as a catcher, but found his calling as a pitcher for the Aztecs as a sophomore. Filter made 80 appearances and recorded 10 saves in his career. Filter was selected by the Toronto Blue Jays in the 1990 Major League Baseball draft. Filter played the 1990 season with the St. Catharines Blue Jays, where he appeared in 19 games recording a 4.50 ERA and 2 saves.

== Coaching career ==
Filter left the professional ranks following his stint in rookie ball, and became an assistant coach at San Diego State. He left the Aztecs after one season to become an assistant at Mission Bay High School. After two seasons at Mission Bay, Filter returned to San Diego State. Filter spend 16 seasons at SDSU and helped produce Stephen Strasburg as the first overall pick in the 2009 Major League Baseball draft.

Filter moved on to be the pitching coach for the Stanford Cardinal in 2010. Filter stayed with the Cardinal for the duration of Mark Marquess tenure with the Cardinal, and interviewed to be his replacement, but when Stanford chose David Esquer, Filter pursued other options.

On June 23, 2017, Filter was named the new head coach of the Santa Clara Broncos baseball program.

== Head coaching record ==
Statistics overview
Season	Team	Overall	Conference	Standing	Postseason
Santa Clara Broncos (West Coast Conference) (2018–present)
2018	Santa Clara	26–26	12–15	T-6th	
2019	Santa Clara	12–40	5–22	10th	
2020	Santa Clara	12–5	0–0		Season canceled due to COVID-19
2021	Santa Clara	18–33	8–19	9th	
2022	Santa Clara	24–29	11–16	8th	
2023	Santa Clara	36–20	17–10	T–2nd	NCAA regional
2024	Santa Clara	26–26	12–12	5th	WCC tournament
2025	Santa Clara	20–30	7–17	T–8th	
Santa Clara:		172–209	72–111		
Total:		172–209			
National champion Postseason invitational champion Conference regular season champion Conference regular season and conference tournament champion Division regular season champion Division regular season and conference tournament champion Conference tournament champion

== See also ==
- List of current NCAA Division I baseball coaches
