= Tommy Medica =

American baseball player

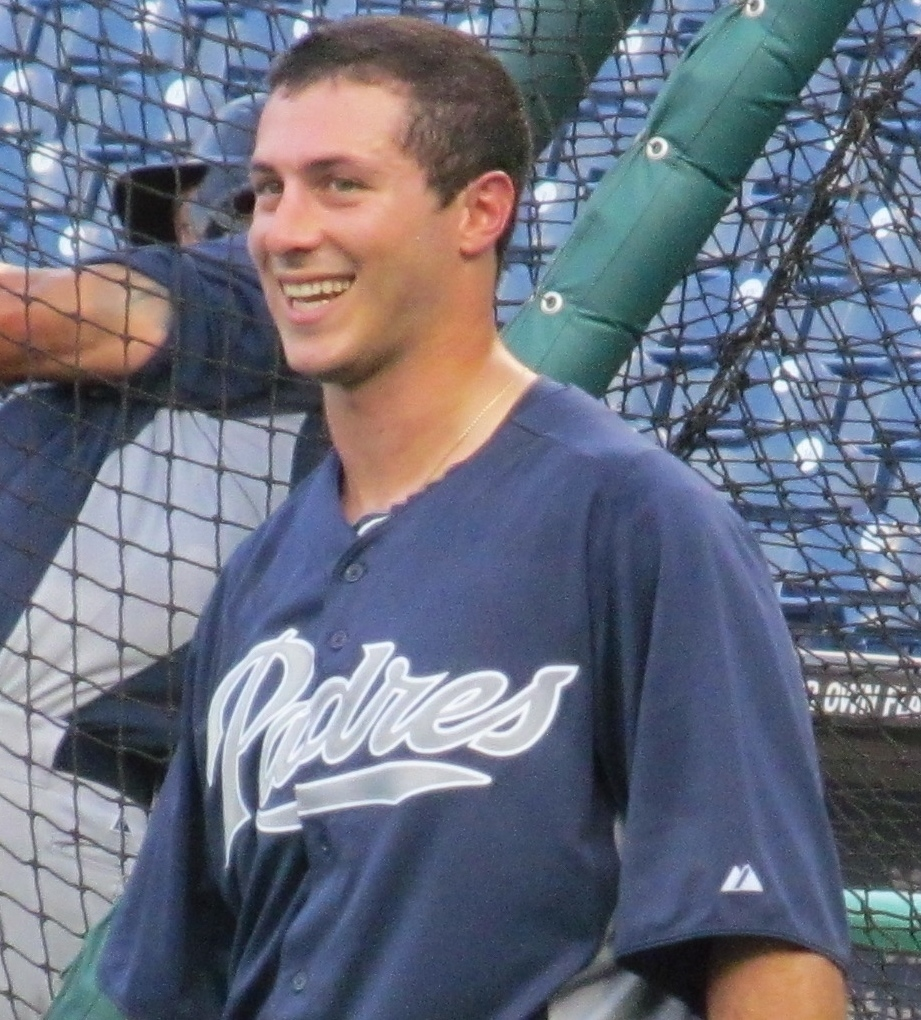
- Medica with the San Diego Padres in 2013
- First baseman
- Born: April 9, 1988 (age 38); San Jose, California, U.S.
- Batted: Right Threw: Right

MLB debut
- September 11, 2013, for the San Diego Padres

Last MLB appearance
- September 28, 2014, for the San Diego Padres

MLB statistics
- Batting average: .246
- Home runs: 12
- Runs batted in: 37
- Stats at Baseball Reference

Teams
- San Diego Padres (2013–2014)
Medals
Men's baseball
Representing United States
Pan American Games
Silver medal – second place	2007 Rio de Janeiro	Team
World Junior Baseball Championship
Silver medal – second place	2006 Sancti Spíritus	Team

Thomas Anthony Medica (born April 9, 1988) is an American former professional baseball first baseman. He played in Major League Baseball (MLB) for the San Diego Padres.

== Amateur career ==
Medica played college baseball at Santa Clara University, after graduating from Bellarmine College Preparatory in 2006. He won the West Coast Conference batting title as a freshman. Medica is one of the 28 graduates of Bellarmine to play professional baseball, along with World Series champion Pat Burrell. Medica was primarily a catcher in his freshman and sophomore years, but he suffered a serious shoulder injury early in his junior season, tearing the labrum in his throwing arm diving into second base. He returned in 2010 and made 50 of 54 starts in the corner outfield positions. He was named a third-team All-American by Collegiate Baseball and first-team All-WCC.

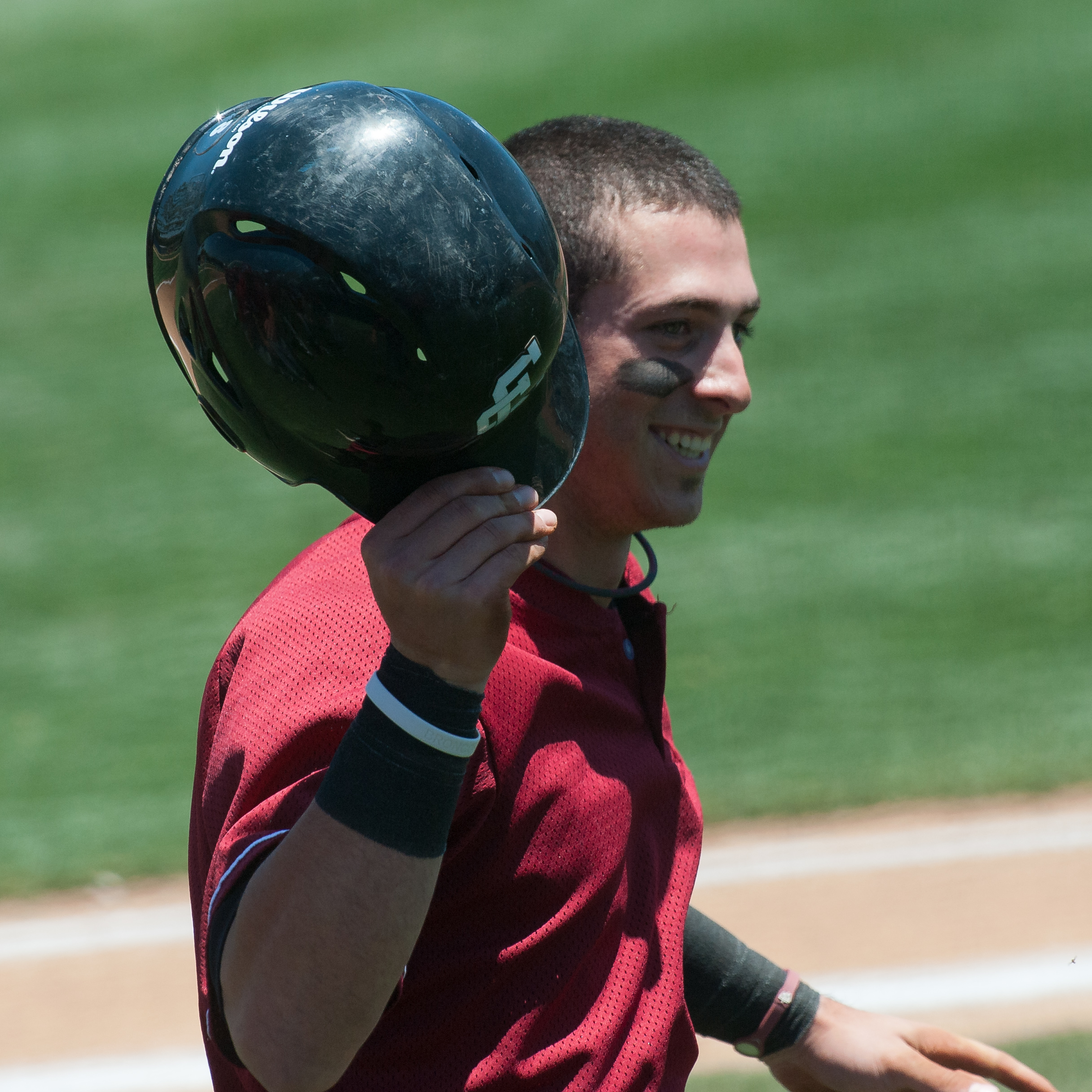
Medica at Santa Clara in 2010

Medica played for the Harwich Mariners of the Cape Cod League in the summer of 2008. Harwich won the title, and Medica was named a member of the 2008 All-League team.

== Professional career ==
=== Draft and minor leagues ===
Medica was drafted by the San Diego Padres in the 14th round of the 2010 MLB draft. Although he was drafted as a catcher, the shoulder injury kept Medica at first base or playing as a designated hitter early in his professional career.

Medica played at three different levels in 2011. He started at Class-A Fort Wayne before going to the disabled list in June with a separated shoulder. He rehabbed with the Arizona League Padres and was then assigned to the High-A Lake Elsinore Storm. He hit .293 for the season with 10 home runs across all 3 leagues. Medica played with Lake Elsinore in 2012 as a first-baseman/designated hitter. He batted .330 with 19 home runs in 93 games.

In 2013, Medica played with the Double-A San Antonio Missions, manning first base in 51 of the 76 games in which he appeared. He hit .296 with 18 home runs with the Missions.

On May 5, 2014, as first baseman for the AAA El Paso Chihuahuas, Medica hit the first ever grand slam in Southwest University Park history. The Chihuahuas would go on to win the game 13–10.

=== San Diego Padres ===
On September 10, 2013, Medica was called up to MLB from Double-A. He made his MLB debut on September 11 against the Philadelphia Phillies, playing first base and hitting a home run against Cliff Lee. He started 19 games at first base in 2013, collecting 20 hits, including 3 home runs, in 79 at-bats.

Medica came to spring training with the Padres in 2014, where he practiced in the outfield as well as first base. Although Medica expressed a desire to get back to catching, his arm was still gaining strength and his best path to the majors was considered to be improving his skills as an outfielder.

Following outfielder Kyle Blanks being optioned to Triple-A, and Carlos Quentin heading to the disabled list, Medica was named to the 25-man roster. He batted .333 with a .561 slugging and 3 home runs in 27 spring training games. He started left field during the Opening Day game versus the Dodgers, going 1 for 3 with a single and a walk. The Padres were victorious, the final score being 3 to 1.

=== Miami Marlins ===
On September 8, 2015, Medica was claimed off waivers by the Miami Marlins. On January 13, 2016, he was designated for assignment by the Marlins, and was subsequently outrighted to Triple-A on January 21. He was released by the Marlins on March 30.

== International career ==
Medica played for the United States national baseball team in the summer of 2007, playing in both the Pan American Games and the World Port Tournament.
