= Stephen Schott =

American sports businessman

Stephen C. Schott
- Born: 1939 (age 86–87); Santa Clara, California, U.S.
- Education: B.A. Santa Clara University
- Occupation: Real estate developer
- Known for: Former owner of the Oakland Athletics

Stephen C. Schott (born 1939) is an American real estate developer and businessman, best known for his ten-year co-ownership of the Oakland Athletics of Major League Baseball (MLB).

== Early life and education ==
Schott was born to a Roman Catholic family in Santa Clara, California in 1939. His father was a part-time professor at Santa Clara University and then worked as an engineer in the public works department for the city of Santa Clara. As a youth, Schott worked in the local fruit orchards and sold prunes from the trees on his father's property. At the age of 16, he began working on road survey crews. He attended the Bellarmine College Preparatory School and then, after qualifying on a partial baseball scholarship, graduated in 1960 from Santa Clara University with a degree in business and management. Both schools now bear buildings in his name (see Stephen Schott Stadium). After school, he joined the Army, and then when he completed his service, he took an accounting job with Ford Motor Company in Milpitas, California. After one year, he took a job with a home builder.

== Career ==
In 1977, he and several partners formed Citation Builders, a real-estate and residence-development company; in 1988 he bought out his partners' shares, reformed the company as a family-run business, Citation Homes Central, and moved it to Santa Clara, California. Despite employing fewer than 25 people, Citation is now one of the largest homebuilders in the state of California, and has been responsible for the construction of over 50,000 individual residences.

=== Ownership of the Oakland Athletics ===
In 1995, he and partner Ken Hofmann purchased the Oakland Athletics from the Walter A. Haas Jr. estate. Under their patronage, general manager Billy Beane's novel management and player-procurement strategies allowed the A's, though a "small-market" club, to make the playoffs despite being restricted by financially limited budgets. Beane's approach to obtaining success within Schott's constraints was documented in Michael Lewis's book Moneyball: The Art of Winning an Unfair Game. Schott appears as a character in the 2011 film adaptation Moneyball, played by Activision Blizzard CEO Bobby Kotick.

Schott and Hofmann sold the A's to a group of Los Angeles real estate developers, headed by Lewis Wolff, in 2005.

=== Life and career after Major League Baseball ===
In 2003, Santa Clara University began to develop plans to build a new baseball field, allowing their nationally recognized soccer team unrestricted access to pre-existing Buck Shaw Stadium. The project floundered under lack of funds until Schott donated $4 million, over half the stadium's total cost. The resulting facility—the Stephen Schott Stadium—opened April 30, 2005, with a game against Gonzaga University.

== Personal life ==
Stephen Schott and his wife Patricia have three children: Lisa Schott, Stephen E. Schott Jr. and Kristen Schott. His son Stephen Schott Jr. is slated to take over the Citation Homes business. Reclusive by nature, Schott avoids the public eye, and a true estimate of his total net worth has not been released.

Preceded by Sandy Alderson	Oakland Athletics President; 1995–1996	Succeeded by Sandy Alderson
