= Yavneh Day School (Los Gatos, California) =

Location
- 14855 Oka Road, Suite 100; Los Gatos, California 95032; United States; 37°15′11″N 121°57′41″W

Information
- Type: Private Elementary Day School
- Motto: Think. Care. Belong.
- Religious affiliation: Jewish/Community
- Established: 1982
- Head of School: Cindy Schlesinger
- Faculty: 35
- Grades: K–8
- Enrollment: 202
- Student to teacher ratio: 12:1 younger classes 17:1 older classes
- Campus: Levy Family Campus
- Mascot: Blaze
- Website: www.yavnehdayschool.org

Yavneh Day School is a private K–8 Jewish day school in Los Gatos, California (USA).

The school was founded in 1982. Both Jewish and General Studies are emphasized. Yavneh Day School is a community Jewish day school, accredited by CAIS and a member of PRIZMAH.

== Milestones ==
In 2007, the school was honored by the Jewish Funders Network (an international organization of family foundations, public philanthropies, and individual donors dedicated to advancing the quality and growth of philanthropy rooted in Jewish values) for raising significant sums. The school was similarly recognized by the Partnership for Excellence in Jewish Education (founded in 1997 by Michael Steinhardt and Rabbi Yitz Greenberg, is a national organization of Jewish philanthropists seeking to establish a Jewish future through strengthening the Jewish day school movement in North America) and became a "supported school" of the PEJE undertaking.

In March 2007, it was reported that "Yavneh Day School receives accreditation":

Yavneh Day School recently underwent the rigorous process in order to renew its accreditation with the California Association of Independent Schools (CAIS), the state’s leading accrediting body for private, not-for-profit schools. School administrators produced nearly 700 pages detailing every aspect of the school’s operation from governance to finances to faculty credentials and student curricula. The accreditation process culminated in a three-day on-site visit in February by an accreditation team.

== Location ==
Yavneh Day School is adjacent to the Addison-Penzak Jewish Community Center of the Silicon Valley, on the Levy Family Campus in Los Gatos. The site is the former location of the Ralph O. Berry Elementary School, Los Gatos Union School District, from 1962 until 1980. During the interim between 1980 and its subsequent purchase by its present owner, the site was also the State Headquarters for the project to eradicate the Mediterranean Fruit Fly, a major crisis in the administration of then-Governor Jerry Brown.

== See also ==
- Yavneh Day School (Cincinnati, Ohio)
