= The Leadership Challenge =

Aim on leadership skills

- Author: James Kouzes; Barry Z. Posner
- Language: English
- Subject: Leadership and professional development
- Genre: Business
- Published: 1987
- Publication place: United States
- Media type: Print
- Pages: 416
- ISBN: 0470651725
- Dewey Decimal: 658.4/092

The Leadership Challenge is a suite of books, training products and assessments based on the book written by James Kouzes and Barry Z. Posner, published by Wiley. First published in 1987, the book's seventh edition was released in 2023.

== Overview ==
Jim Kouzes and Barry Posner started developing the idea for The Leadership Challenge when they were planning to present about leadership at a two-day conference. Academics at Santa Clara University, Kouzes and Posner were set to speak after Tom Peters, who was presenting about successful companies. Kouzes and Posner decided to focus on individual leadership skills. The name for the book came from the concept of the challenges that take place to "make extraordinary things happen", according to Kouzes in 2012.

=== "The Five Practices of Exemplary Leadership" ===
The Leadership Challenge uses case studies to examine "The Five Practices of Exemplary Leadership", as researched and developed by Kouzes and Posner. Their first surveys for the five practices started in 1983, by asking people "What do you do as a leader when you're performing at your personal best?" Over 30 years, they have done thousands of interviews and collected approximately 75,000 written responses. Kouzes and Posner identified five common concepts in their survey, hence the five practices, which are: "Model the Way", "Inspire a Shared Vision", "Challenge the Process", "Enable Others to Act" and "Encourage the Heart". Kouzes cites that the last practice, "Encourage the Heart", is the most uncommonly seen in leadership roles. The concept focuses on being sincere, including sincere celebrations devoted to recognizing employee successes. "Model the Way" encourages leaders to behave the same way they encourage others to behave, with their own voice and values. "Inspire a Shared Vision" focuses on developing a vision and series of goals that everyone at the organization cares about and works towards collectively, with clear understanding. "Challenge the Process" encourages moving "outside the boundaries" to be innovative to make change. "Enable Others to Act" is trust-based, encouraging leaders to create a safe and trusting environment for people to collaborate, experiment, and engage.By implementing these practices, leaders can foster an environment that not only drives performance but also enhances employee engagement and satisfaction.

=== Important leadership traits ===
Kouzes and Posner believe that leadership is learned, not something one is born with. They look at traits seen within introvert and extrovert personalities, and examine how they can be developed into leaders by using those skills. For example, extroverts lean towards sharing of their thoughts and ideas with energy to larger groups, when introverts tend to be more quiet and one-on-one in their engagement about ideas to others. A survey featured in the book shows that honesty is the most respected personality trait that a leader can have. Three additional traits that leaders around the world share are forward-thinking, inspiration, and competence.

The book also looks at work styles and how people function in organizational settings, and how to improve skills like visionising based on their personality traits. Kouzes and Posner express an importance in having a "shared vision" for everyone on one's team or at one's company. If a shared vision can be developed and exhibited, staff will be more prone to feeling confident and motivated in their job. Symbolic language like metaphors and storytelling are also important components to leadership skills. Kouzes and Posner believe that symbolic language helps in persuasion and gathering buy-in. Using emotive words and images also helps in inspiring those leaders are leading or hoping to lead. Positive thinking and expression is another key concept in leadership within the book. Positivity can rub off on others around the leader, leading to productivity and satisfaction. Balancing positivity with negativity is important, with positivity a tool that leaders can use to get buy-in from staff for projects and programs. Charisma, honesty, and being emotional are also seen as good signs of leadership.

=== Leadership Practices Inventory ===
Developed out of the key traits found within "The Five Practices of Exemplary Leadership" is the Leadership Practices Inventory, or LPI, a print and online assessment, which the authors called a "360 assessment tool", which leaders can use to allow staff to be surveyed about specific leaders in their organization. It also provides self-assessment tools for leaders to learn more about behavioral tendencies affect their leadership. The tool has been used by Cracker Barrel, the United States Treasury Department, and the American Red Cross.

== Publication and recognition ==
The book was first published in 1987. Since then, it has sold over two million copies. It has been translated into 20 languages. In 2012, the fifth edition of The Leadership Challenge was released, marking the 25th anniversary of its publication. When asked about the release of the 5th edition, in light of other leadership development programs that have come into existence, Posner stated that maintaining one's leadership skills was similar to how one might maintain their health throughout their lives. The 5th edition features updated stories and examples for contemporary context. Posner described the 5th edition as being "more prescriptive than descriptive" in its style. The book is a core teaching tool in leadership classes at St. Catherine University.

Kouzes and Posner have published excerpts and written guest columns featuring The Leadership Challenge for Fast Company.

== Reception ==
The Washington Post describes The Leadership Challenge as a "business-meets-self help canon." Carmine Gallo and Tom Gerace have cited The Leadership Challenge as an important book in developing their leadership skills. Verne Harnish described the book as "one of the five most important leadership books ever written."
