= Stevens Stadium =

Soccer stadium in Santa Clara, California, United States

- Buck Shaw Field
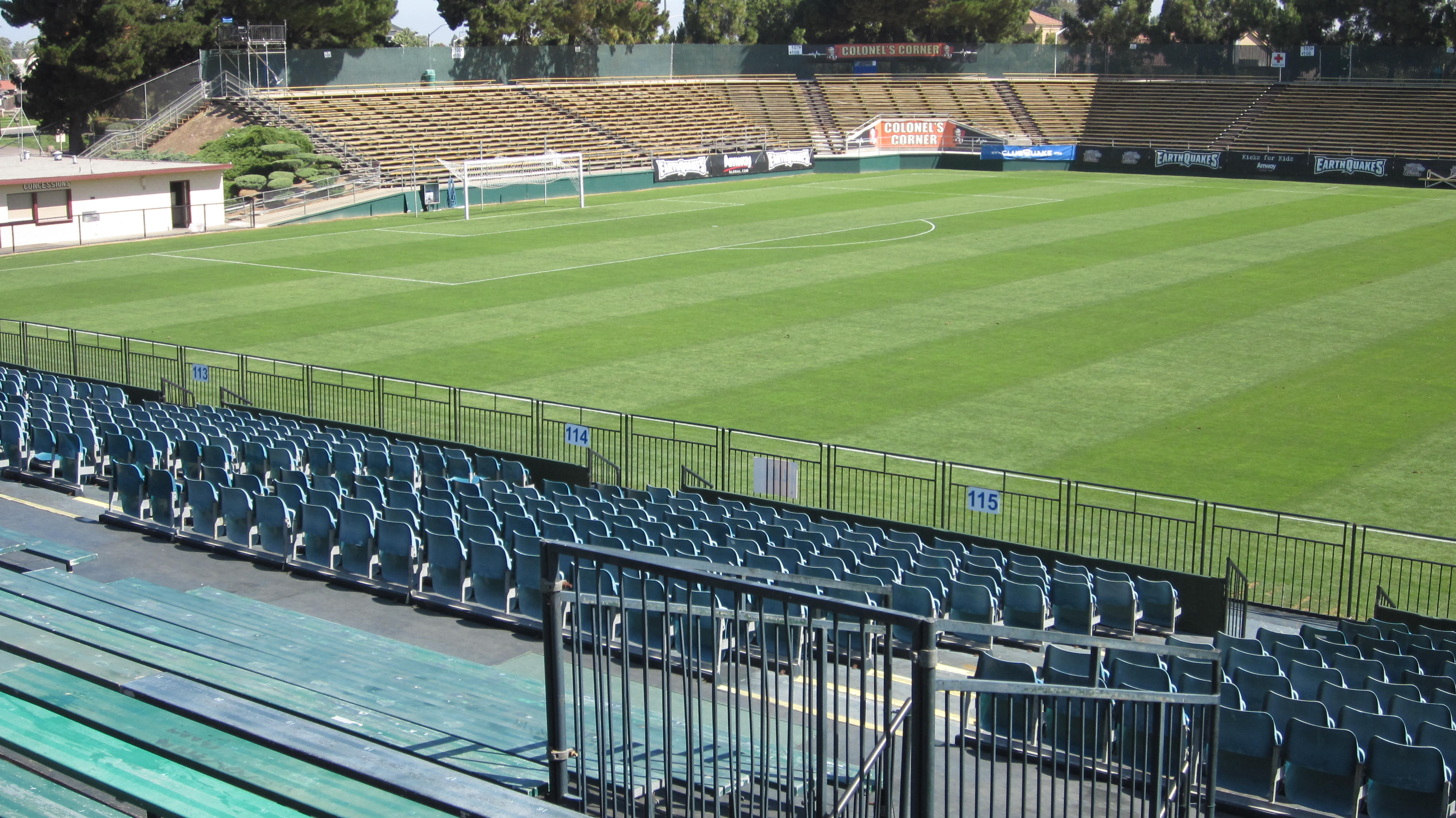
- View of the stadium in 2010

- Location in the United States Location in California
- Interactive map of Stevens Stadium
- Former names: Buck Shaw Stadium (1962–2015)
- Address: 500 El Camino Real
- Location: Santa Clara University; Santa Clara, California, U.S.
- Coordinates: 37°21′2″N 121°56′12″W
- Owner: Santa Clara University
- Operator: Santa Clara University
- Capacity: Soccer: 10,525 (2008–2015); 7,000 (2015–present)
- Surface: Natural grass
- Field size: 74 by 115 yd (68 by 105 m)
- Public transit: Santa Clara Station

Construction
- Groundbreaking: 1961
- Opened: September 22, 1962; 64 years ago
- Cost: $4 million (2008 upgrades) ($5.98 million in 2025)

Tenants
- Santa Clara University (NCAA Division I WCC): Football (NCAA-WFC; 1962–1992); Baseball (1963–2005); Soccer (1962–present); Professional sports; San Jose Earthquakes (MLS) (2008–2014); FC Gold Pride (WPS) (2009)

Website
- santaclarabroncos.com/stevensstadium

Stevens Stadium is a 7,000-seat soccer stadium on the west coast of the United States, located on the campus of Santa Clara University in Santa Clara, California. The stadium is the current home of the Santa Clara Broncos soccer teams and was the former home of the now-defunct football team as well as the baseball team. The baseball team moved to their new home at Stephen Schott Stadium in 2005.

The former home of the San Jose Earthquakes of Major League Soccer, the stadium's capacity was increased in the winter of 2007 from a capacity of 6,800 to 10,300. It was named "Buck Shaw Stadium" up until a renovation was done in 2015.

== History ==
=== Multi sport ===
Buck Shaw Stadium opened its gates for the first time on September 22, 1962 when it hosted a football game between UC Davis and Santa Clara. Named for Lawrence T. "Buck" Shaw, a former football coach of the SCU Broncos, the playing surface still retains his name to the present day, being named "Buck Shaw Field". The stadium was used for football games until 1992 and baseball games until 2005.

In summer of 1981 the stadium was the main venue for the 1981 World Games, an international multi-sport event.

During the 1994 FIFA World Cup, the stadium was the official practice field of the Brazil soccer team. The Brazilians won the World Cup that year. It also played host to the Romanian national team for their practice prior to that year's quarterfinal match.

Stevens Stadium set a record for highest attendance at a women's outdoor collegiate sporting event in 1996. The 1996 NCAA Division I women's soccer tournament semifinals and finals were played at Buck Shaw, which had its capacity temporarily expanded to 8,800 seats and sold out both days of the tournament. The championship game attendance record was broken the following year in 1997 at UNCG Soccer Stadium in Greensboro, North Carolina.

=== Soccer-only ===
In 2005, the venue was converted from a multipurpose facility to a soccer-only facility when the dugouts, baseball infield, and baseball backstop were permanently removed. The name was changed to "Stevens Stadium" following a renovation project in 2015; the project was funded by a $7.7 million donation from alumna Mary Stevens and her husband Mark.

The stadium is the current location of the commencement ceremonies for the university. The site was first used for the undergraduate commencement on Saturday, June 9, 2001.

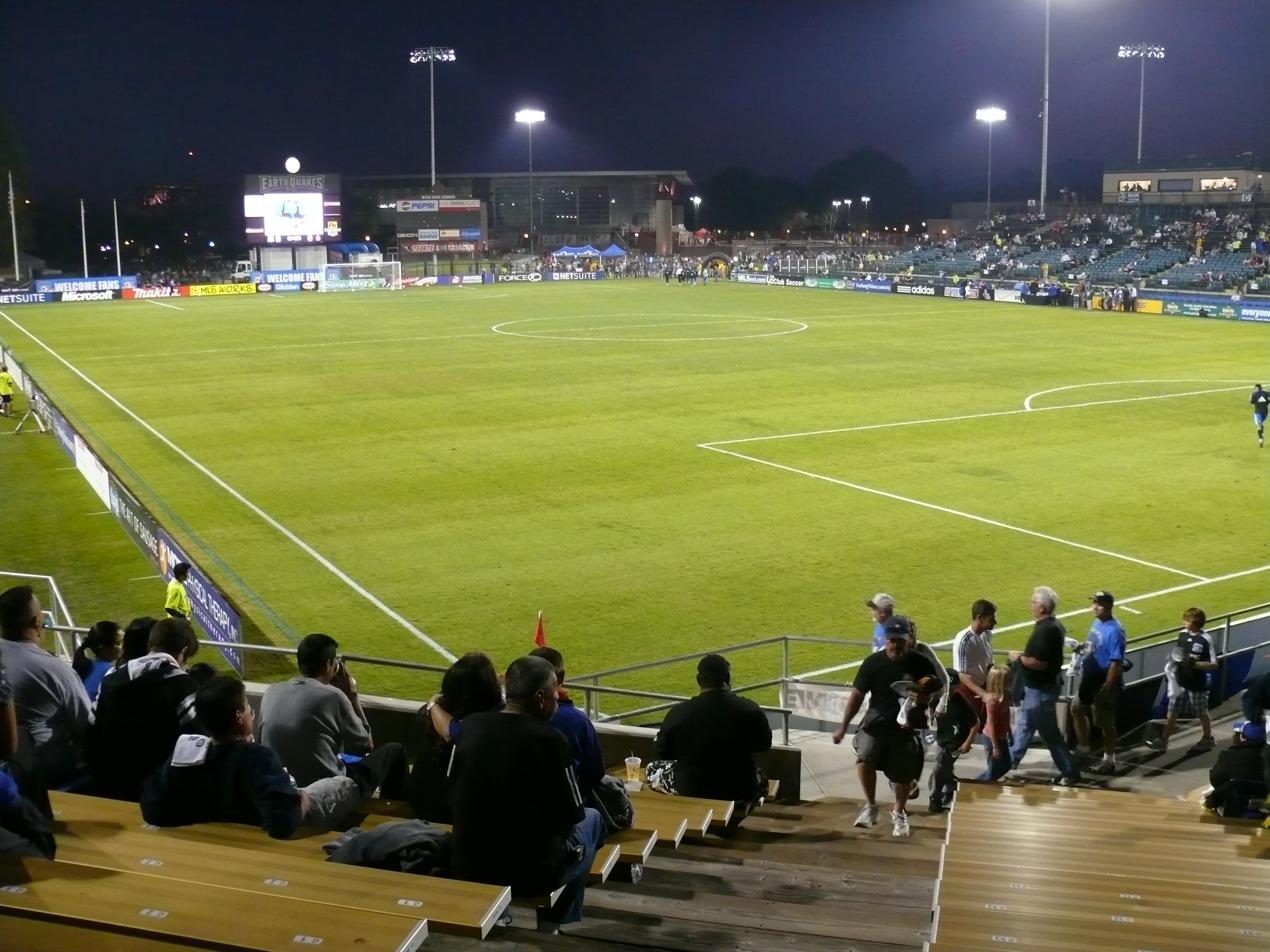
The stadium during a San Jose Earthquakes match in 2010. The franchise used Stevens Stadium as home venue until 2014, when they moved to Avaya Stadium

On October 26, 2007, the San Jose Earthquakes of Major League Soccer announced that they would play a majority of their home games during the 2008 season at the stadium. Upgrades such as additional seating and bathrooms were added to the stadium in order for it to comply with MLS standards and funded by the Earthquakes organization over the last part 2008. The capacity was increased from 6,800 seats to 10,300 seats. In addition, the field was moved closer to the existing grandstand, with a small section removed from section 107 to accommodate the shift. The Santa Clara practice field between the Leavey Center and Stevens was replaced with an "Italgrass" artificial turf surface.

Drainage improvements were also made to the stadium's field in concert with the field crown being removed to produce a flat pitch. A new video scoreboard was added along with additional concession and merchandising stands. General facilities were also modernized or improved including the addition of new lighting, a TV press box, new sound system, and an additional grandstand on the stadium's west side. The new grandstand included all of the seating additions made to the stadium. About half of the new grandstand included tip up seating. Overall, the enhancements cost around $4 million.

After the Earthquakes departed for their new Avaya Stadium, the university undertook an improvement project that removed the original east side press box from the stadium as well as the Earthquakes temporary bleachers on the west side of the stadium. In their place a new smaller permanent west side grandstand, press box and entry plaza were installed. Capacity of the stadium was reduced back to 7,000 permanent seats as a result.

In 2009, the stadium also hosted FC Gold Pride, one of the seven charter teams of Women's Professional Soccer. However, Gold Pride moved to Castro Valley High School, and then Pioneer Stadium in Hayward, for the 2010 season.

In 2021, the stadium hosted the College Cup final that determinated the winner the 2021 NCAA Division I women's soccer tournament. In that match, Florida State defeated BYU by penalty shoot-out to win their third NCAA national title. scored the goal for the 4–3 win on penalties that gave Florida State its third national title.

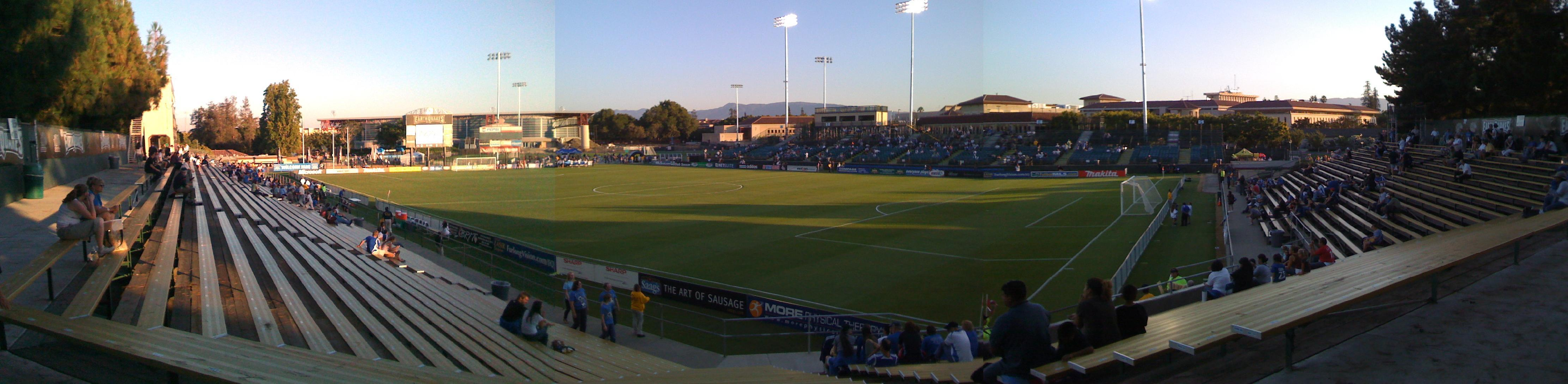
Buck Shaw Stadium before an Earthquakes game in September 2008

== Other sports events ==
=== Rugby ===
The stadium has also hosted several international rugby union matches. In 2006, Buck Shaw hosted three pool matches in the Churchill Cup competition, becoming the first U.S. venue to host matches in that tournament (all matches in the 2003–2005 editions had been in Canada).

In May 2009 the stadium again hosted an international rugby match, with 10,000 fans turning out to watch the game between the United States and Ireland.

==== International matches ====
Date	Home	Score	Opponent	Competition	Attendance	Ref.
June 3, 2006	United States	13–28	Ireland A	2006 Churchill Cup	3,700	
June 8, 2006	United States	6–74	(New Zealand) Māori All Blacks	2006 Churchill Cup	3,562	
June 10, 2006	Māori All Blacks (New Zealand)	27–6	Ireland A	2006 Churchill Cup		
July 1, 2006	United States	91–0	Barbados	2007 Rugby World Cup qualifying		
May 31, 2009	United States	10–27	Ireland	2009 Setanta Challenge Cup	10,000	

Events and tenants
Preceded by first stadium	Home of the Santa Clara Broncos soccer 1962–present	Succeeded by current stadium
Preceded by unknown	Home of the Santa Clara Broncos baseball 1962–2005	Succeeded by Stephen Schott Stadium
Preceded by unknown	Home of the Santa Clara Broncos football 1962–1992	Succeeded by final stadium
Preceded by Fetzer Field	Home of the Women's College Cup; 1995	Succeeded by UNCG Soccer Stadium
Preceded by Spartan Stadium	Home of the San Jose Earthquakes; 2008–2014	Succeeded by Avaya Stadium
Preceded by first stadium	Home of FC Gold Pride; 2009	Succeeded by Pioneer Stadium
Preceded by WakeMed Soccer Park	NCAA women's soccer final 2021	Succeeded by WakeMed Soccer Park
