= Ravi Bapna =

Indian-born American data scientist

- Occupations: Data scientist, digital transformationalist, business academic and speaker
- Awards: The Inaugural Practical impacts Award, INFORMS Information Systems Society; Distinguished Academic Fellow, INFORMS Information Systems Society

Academic background
- Education: B. Comm. B. Tech., Computer Engineering; Ph.D., Information Systems
- Alma mater: University of Calcutta; Manipal Institute of Technology; University of Connecticut

Academic work
- Institutions: University of Minnesota’s Carlson School of Management
- Website: https://www.scu.edu/business/about/leadership/dean/biography/

Ravi Bapna is an Indian-born American data scientist, digital transformationalist, business academic, executive educator and speaker. He is the Curtis L. Carlson Chair in Business Analytics and Information Systems, the Associate Dean for Executive Education and the Academic Director of the Carlson Analytics Lab and the Analytics for Good Institute at the University of Minnesota’s Carlson School of Management.

Bapna’s research falls in the areas encompassing social media, peer influence, monetization and design of Freemium communities, big-data analytics, online dating and matching, economics of information systems, human capital issues in the IT services industry, online auctions, e-market design, grid computing, and the design of the IT organization. He has also worked extensively on the emerging digital transformation of business and society, considering it as a giant global laboratory

Bapna is a member of several professional societies and organizations, including the Information Systems Society, where he was elected as president for 2013-2015. He also serves as a Senior Editor for Information Systems Research.

== Education ==
Bapna received his Bachelor of Commerce degree from the University of Calcutta in 1989, and a bachelor’s degree in Computer Engineering from the Manipal Institute of Technology in 1993. He then moved to the United States, earning his Doctoral Degree in Information Systems from the University of Connecticut in 1999.

== Career ==
Following his doctoral degree, Bapna started his career as an assistant professor at the University of Texas at Dallas in 1999. In the following year, he held appointment at Northeastern University as an assistant professor. In 2001, he joined the University of Connecticut as an assistant professor, and became an associate professor and Ackerman Scholar in 2004. From 2006 till 2008, he was appointed by the Indian School of Business as an associate professor of information systems. He then held appointment at the University of Minnesota, Twin Cities, as a tenured associate professor till 2010, and as Board of Overseers (Full) Professor till 2015.

During his tenure at the University of Minnesota, Bapna also held several administrative appointments. He served as a Department Chair for Information and Decision Science till 2015, as Program Director for MS-Business Analytics Program till 2017, and became an Academic Director of Carlson Analytics Lab, and Curtis L. Carlson Chair in Business Analytics and Information Systems in 2015, an Associate Dean for Executive Education in 2017, and Academic Director for Analytics for Good Institute in 2020. From 2012 to 2016, he was the founding academic co-director (with Professor Joe Konstan) of University of Minnesota's Social Media and Business Analytics Collaborative (SOBACO).

In 2021, Bapna was appointed as Area Leader of the Information Systems area at the Indian School of Business with the role of providing academic leadership and counsel to the ISB Dean Madan Pilutla.

On September 1, 2026, Bapna was appointed as Dean of the Leavey School of Business at Santa Clara University, along with his wife Sofia Bapna who will join the Leavey School of Business faculty.

== Research ==
Bapna primarily focuses on big-data analytics, peer influence, social media, monetization and design of Freemium communities, online dating and matching, economics of information systems, online auctions, e-market design, and grid computing, etc.

=== Online auctions ===
In his study regarding online auctions, Bapna highlighted the weakness of the approaches where a majority of auctions are multiunit in nature, studied the largely ignored discrete and sequential nature of such auctions, and showed the non-uniformity of consumer bidding strategies. He explored the simulation approach, and examined the decision space for both bid takers and bid makers in web-based dynamic price setting processes. He also found out that hybrid strategies have the potential of significantly altering bidders' likelihood of winning, as well as their surplus. In 2020, he focused the allocative efficiency in online auctions, and improved the performance of multiple online auctions while using seek-and-protect agents. Furthermore, he demonstrated how the taxonomy of bidder behavior can be used to enhance the design of some types of information systems.

=== Social media- randomized field experiments ===
Bapna conducted a randomized experiment and tested the existence of causal peer influence in the general population. This paper received the best paper award from Management Science (IS area) in 2018. He has recently developed ‘honest-bagging’ approach based on the principles of causal forests, and discussed its role in personalizing the high-dimensional treatment around which images to show to what types of users. In his study, he also focused online dating platforms, and highlighted the impact of a particular anonymity feature, which is unique to online environments, on matching outcomes. He further demonstrated that weak signaling is a key mechanism in achieving higher levels of matching outcomes. In 2017, he conducted randomized experiments to test the efficacy of using financial incentives, and social norms in terms of motivating consumers, and to evaluate the treatment-induced self-selection and sentiment bias.

=== Experiential learning and teaching innovation ===
Being the Academic Director of the Carlson Analytics Lab, Bapna focuses on different kinds of business analytics problems.

As an Academic Director of the AGI, Bapna along with Mary Zellmer-Bruhn and Ellen Trader leads a research group which addresses issues related to gender equality in the workplace, with a particular attention on three major themes: Funding & Founders, Entry & Advancement, and Value & Voice. He also works on an engagement model which is built around two kinds of projects: Business Analytics Consulting and Collaborative Research with Data.

=== Executive education ===
Bapna leads Executive education unit at the Carlson School of Management and serves on the serves on the executive education faculty at NYU Stern, Vienna University of Business and Economics (WU), and the Indian School of Business.

== Awards and honors ==
- 2004, 2005 - Treibeck Electronic Commerce Institute (TECI) Fellow, UConn School of Business
- 2014 - Dean’s Exceptional Engagement Award, Carlson School of Management
- 2015 - Long-Term Service Award, Carlson School of Management
- 2018 - Distinguished Academic Fellow, INFORMS Information Systems Society
- 2020 - The Inaugural Practical impacts Award, INFORMS Information Systems Society

== Bibliography ==
- Warkentin, M., Bapna, R., & Sugumaran, V. (2001). E‐knowledge networks for inter‐organizational collaborative e‐business. Logistics Information Management.
- Bapna, R., Goes, P., & Gupta, A. (2003). Analysis and design of business-to-consumer online auctions. Management science, 49(1), 85-101.
- Bapna, R., Goes, P., Gupta, A., & Jin, Y. (2004). User heterogeneity and its impact on electronic auction market design: An empirical exploration. MIS quarterly, 21-43.
- Bapna, R., & Umyarov, A. (2015). Do your online friends make you pay? A randomized field experiment on peer influence in online social networks. Management Science, 61(8), 1902-1920.
- Baesens, B., Bapna, R., Marsden, J. R., Vanthienen, J., & Zhao, J. L. (2016). Transformational issues of big data and analytics in networked business. MIS quarterly, 40(4).
