= Yavneh Day School (Cincinnati, Ohio) =

Jewish day school in Cincinnati, Ohio

Coordinates: 39.208454°N 84.364922°W

Rockwern Academy located in Cincinnati, Ohio, United States, is an independent private pre-K-8 Jewish day school that caters to all Jewish denominations and to affiliated as well as unaffiliated Jewish families. The school was founded in 1952 as Yavneh Day School at a time when Jewish Americans had started to become more receptive to full-time Jewish schooling for their children.

The school is subdivided into a preschool, lower school, and middle school. It emphasizes both Jewish studies and general secular studies. In January 2008, the school changed its name in honor of Dr. S. Sunner Rockwern who donated four million dollars to its endowment.

== Context and history ==
The roots of the school's origins are intertwined with the history of the Jews in Cincinnati. Many Jewish educational institutions were created and merged, and continue to do so, and Yavneh was part of that process:

The roots of the Cincinnati Community Hebrew School may be traced to founding of the Talmud Torah Society on March 1, 1887, with the purpose of providing Orthodox religious instruction for poor Jewish children… In 1901, the Society expanded… with tuition fees for those who could pay while an Orthodox female Sabbath School began in 1902. Classes were conducted in Yiddish until 1904. Schools served both Jewish children whose parents joined synagogues as well as the unaffiliated… Beth Am (founded in 1948) merged with the Talmud Torah Association in 1953. They were supported by the Jewish Welfare Fund… In 1966, the Hebrew Day Schools merged with Yavneh Day School, bringing Hebrew Day Schools into Cincinnati Community Hebrew Schools. In 1970, the CCHS reorganized, with the Cincinnati Community Hebrew Schools serving as an umbrella agency…

Part of the main tenets of classical Reform Judaism as espoused by the Pittsburgh Platform was to reject the ways of orthodoxy and part of that was to send the children of their affiliated synagogues to secular public schools and to receive Jewish education at temple "Sunday schools" instead. The introduction of all-day Jewish schooling should be seen as significant in the midst of a city that was the birthplace of Reform Judaism.

After its founding in 1952 it faced an uphill battle to recruit students and retain its strength as a school:

Over the years, Yavneh faced many challenges to its future, but perhaps none was as great as the constant pressure to merge with another Jewish day school, Chofetz Chaim. The first overture from Chofetz Chaim came in 1959, when Rabbi Eliezer Silver tried to force a merger with Chofetz Chaim by summoning... to a rabbinical court of arbitration, or "Din Torah," to discuss his demand to absorb Yavneh's student body into that of Chofetz Chaim. Rabbi Silver was the respected recognized leader of Orthodox Jewry in the US. A committee met in December of 1961 to discuss a merger, but talks foundered over a choice of school directors.

Yavneh subsequently merged with Beth Am and Talmud Torah to form the Cincinnati Community Hebrew Schools (CCHS) a move that reflected that the Yavneh leadership had rejected the overtures of the strictly Orthodox line of Rabbi Eliezer Silver (the accepted Dean Of Orthodox Jewy of the United States and Canada) and was moving towards and an alignment with the non-Orthodox part of the Jewish community. During the 1970s there was a short-lived merger with the Cincinnati Hebrew Day school after which the school experienced greater enrollment.

== Function and support ==
As a mark of its strategic importance to the Jews of Cincinnati it has been extremely successful in recent years in its fundraising. It has won significant support from the Jewish Federation of Cincinnati, the Jewish Foundation of Cincinnati, the AVI CHAI Foundation, and the Jewish Funders Network (an international organization of family foundations, public philanthropies, and individual funders dedicated to advancing the quality and growth of philanthropy rooted in Jewish values) among many others.

== Change of name ==
As of January 2008 it was announced that:

A $4 million gift will establish an endowment for Yavneh Day School, which will take on the name of the donor, the Jewish Federation of Cincinnati said Friday.

The gift, from the Rockwern Charitable Foundation, will "reinvigorate and secure the future" of the Kenwood school, according to a news release. It also will kick off an effort to increase the endowment to $10 million by 2012.

In honor of the donation, the school will be renamed the Rockwern Academy, the federation said.

"Rockwern's trustees understand that today a top-quality, independent Jewish day school is an absolute prerequisite for any city that wants to support a vibrant Jewish community," said Shepard Englander, CEO of the federation, which secured the gift for the school and will manage the endowment.

The Cincinnati-based Rockwern Charitable Foundation was established by the late Dr. Samuel Rockwern. Yavneh Day School, founded in 1952, has more than 230 children enrolled in pre-school through eighth grade.
