= 2009–10 Western Athletic Conference men's basketball season =

- League: NCAA Division I
- Sport: Basketball
- Teams: 9

Regular Season
- Champion: Utah State
- Season MVP: Luke Babbitt

Tournament
- Champions: New Mexico State

Basketball seasons
- 2008–09 2010–11

2009–10 WAC men's basketball standings
	Conf.				Overall
Team	W		L	PCT	W		L	PCT
Utah State	14	–	2	.875	27	–	7	.794
Nevada	11	–	5	.688	21	–	13	.618
New Mexico State†	11	–	5	.688	22	–	11	.667
Louisiana Tech	9	–	7	.563	24	–	11	.686
Fresno State	7	–	9	.438	15	–	18	.455
San Jose State	6	–	10	.375	14	–	17	.452
Idaho	6	–	10	.375	15	–	16	.484
Boise State	5	–	11	.313	15	–	17	.469
Hawai'i	3	–	13	.188	10	–	20	.333
† 2010 WAC tournament winner Rankings from AP Poll

The 2009–10 Western Athletic Conference men's basketball season began with practices on October 17, 2009 and ended with the 2010 WAC men's basketball tournament March 11–13, 2010 at the Lawlor Events Center in Reno, NV on the campus of the University of Nevada. Utah State won the regular season championship while New Mexico State won the WAC Tournament.

== Pre-season ==
The WAC conducted a media teleconference on October 20, 2009 and released the media and coaches poll, as well as the preseason All-WAC teams and player of the year.

=== WAC Media Poll ===
Rank	Team	Votes
1	Utah State (15)	273
2	Nevada (12)	269
3	New Mexico State (6)	226
4	Idaho	193
5	Boise State	145
6	Louisiana Tech	140
7	Fresno State	130
8	San Jose State (1)	88
9	Hawai'i	66

=== Media All-WAC Team ===
- Luke Babbitt, So. F, Nevada
- Mac Hobson, Sr. G, Idaho
- Armon Johnson, Jr. G, Nevada
- Jared Quayle, Sr. G, Utah State
- Jahmar Young, Jr. G, New Mexico State

Player of the Year

- Luke Babbitt, So. F, Nevada

=== WAC coaches poll ===
Rank	Team	Votes
1	Utah State (8)	64
2	Nevada (1)	53
3	New Mexico State	50
4	Idaho	42
5	Louisiana Tech	31
6	Fresno State	30
7	Boise State	23
8	San Jose State	19
9	Hawai'i	12

=== Coaches All-WAC Team ===
First Team

- Luke Babbitt, So. F, Nevada
- Mac Hobson, Sr. G, Idaho
- Armon Johnson, Jr. G, Nevada
- Jered Quayle, Sr. G, Utah State
- Jahmar Young, Jr. G, New Mexico State

Second Team

- Roderick Flemings, Sr., F, Hawai‘i
- Paul George, So. G/F, Fresno State
- Kyle Gibson, Sr. G, Louisiana Tech
- Sylvester Seay, Sr. F, Fresno State
- Tai Wesley, Jr. F, Utah State

Player of the Year

- Luke Babbitt, So. F, Nevada

== Players of the week ==
Players of the week:

Week	Player	School	Weekly stats
1 - Nov 16	Roderick Flemings	Hawai'i	18.5 PPG, 11.0 RPG, 2.5 AST, 55.6 FG%
2 - Nov 23	Joey Shaw	Nevada	20.5 PPG, 9.0 RPG, 2.5 AST, 61.9 FG%
3 - Nov 30	Ike Okoye	Boise State	17.0 PPG, 12.5 RPG, 2.5 AST, 4.5 BLOCKS, 61.9 FG%
4 - Dec 7	Kyle Gibson	La Tech	27.5 PPG, 6.5 RPG, 4.0 AST, 59.3 FG%
5 - Dec 14	Jahmar Young	New Mexico State	24.0 PPG, 1.0 RPG, 3.0 AST, 47.0 FG%
6 - Dec 21	Adrian Oliver	San Jose State	31.0 PPG, 8.0 RPG, 2.0 AST, 52.6 FG%
7 - Dec 28	Tai Wesley	Utah State	16.7 PPG, 7.7 RPG, 4.0 AST, 65.4 FG%
8 - Jan 4	Olu Ashaolu	La Tech	15.5 PPG, 16.5 RPG, 1.5 AST, 52.4 FG%
9 - Jan 11	Luke Babbitt	Nevada	23.0 PPG, 10.5 RPG, 3.0 AST, 58.3 FG%
10 - Jan 18	Jared Quayle	Utah State	14.0 PPG, 5.3 RPG, 5.7 AST, 55.2 FG%
11 - Jan 25	Adrian Oliver	San Jose State	30.5 PPG, 3.0 RPG, 5.0 AST, 54.3 FG%
12 - Feb 1	Hamidu Rahman	New Mexico State	22.0 PPG, 12.0 RPG, 66.7 FG%
13 - Feb 8	Jahmar Young	New Mexico State	25.0 PPG, 3.0 RPG, 5.0 AST, 61.5 FG%
14 - Feb 15	Armon Johnson	Nevada	23.5 PPG, 1.5 RPG, 5.5 AST, 50.0 FG%
15 - Feb 22	Roderick Flemings	Hawai'i	32.0 PPG, 8.0 RPG, 2.5 AST, 45.1 FG%
16 - Mar 1	Robert Arnold	Boise State	22.0 PPG, 9.0 RPG, 3.0 AST, 75.0 FG%
17 - Mar 7	Tai Wesley	Utah State	22.5 PPG, 6.5 RPG, 5.5 AST, 82.6 FG%

On January 26 San Jose State's Adrian Oliver was named the Oscar Robertson National Player of the Week by the U.S. Basketball Writers Association for games ending the week of January 24.

== Conference tournament ==
Quarterfinals, Thursday, March 11
1	Utah State	84
8	Boise State	60
4	Louisiana Tech	74
5	Fresno State	66
3	New Mexico State	90
6	San Jose State	69
2	Nevada	87
7	Idaho	71

Semifinals, Friday, March 12
1	Utah State	85
4	Louisiana Tech	55
3	New Mexico State	80
2	Nevada	79

Championship, Saturday, March 13
1	Utah State	63
3	New Mexico State	69

== Head coaches ==
Greg Graham, Boise State (fired on March 12, 2010)
Steve Cleveland, Fresno State
Bob Nash, Hawai'i (fired on March 8, 2010)
Don Verlin, Idaho
Kerry Rupp, Louisiana Tech

David Carter, Nevada
Marvin Menzies, New Mexico State
George Nessman, San Jose State
Stew Morrill, Utah State

== Postseason ==
=== NCAA tournament ===
First round

(12) New Mexico State vs. (5) Michigan State L 70–67

(12) Utah State vs. (5) Texas A&M L 69–53

=== NIT ===
First round

(6) Nevada @ (3) Wichita State W 74–70

Second round

(6) Nevada @ (2) Rhode Island L 85–83

=== CollegeInsider.com tournament ===
First round

Louisiana Tech vs. Southern Mississippi W 66–57

Quarterfinals

Louisiana Tech @ Missouri State L 69–40

=== 2010 NBA draft ===
PG	Point guard	SG	Shooting guard	SF	Small forward	PF	Power forward	C	Center

Round	Pick	Player	Position	Nationality	Team	School/club team
1	10	Paul George	SF	United States	Indiana Pacers	Fresno State (So.)
1	16	Luke Babbitt	SF	United States	Minnesota Timberwolves (from Charlotte via Denver,^{[c]} traded to Portland)^{[B]}	Nevada (So.)
2	34	Armon Johnson	PG	United States	Portland Trail Blazers (from Golden State)^{[k]}	Nevada (Jr.)
2	51	Magnum Rolle	PF/C	Bahamas	Oklahoma City Thunder (from Portland via Dallas and Minnesota,^{[d]} traded to Indiana)^{[L]}	Louisiana Tech (Sr.)

==== Pre-draft trades ====
Prior to the day of the draft, the following trades were made and resulted in exchanges of draft picks between the teams.

- ^{c} On June 25, 2009, Minnesota acquired Charlotte's first-round pick from Denver in exchange for the draft rights to Ty Lawson. Previously, Denver acquired a first-round pick on June 25, 2008 from Charlotte in exchange for the 20th pick in the 2008 draft.
- ^{d 1} ^{2} ^{3} On June 23, 2010, Oklahoma City acquired Daequan Cook and the 18th pick in the 2010 Draft from Miami in exchange for the 32nd pick in the 2010 Draft. Previously, Oklahoma City acquired Etan Thomas and two second-round picks on July 27, 2009 from Minnesota in exchange for Damien Wilkins and Chucky Atkins. Previously, Minnesota acquired a second-round pick and cash considerations on June 25, 2009 from Dallas in exchange for the draft rights to Nick Calathes. Previously, Dallas acquired a second-round pick, the 24th and 56th picks in the 2009 draft on June 24, 2009 from Portland in exchange for the 22nd pick in the 2009 draft.
- ^{k 1} ^{2} On June 22, 2010, Milwaukee acquired Corey Maggette and the 44th pick in the 2010 draft from Golden State in exchange for Charlie Bell and Dan Gadzuric. Previously, Golden State acquired the 44th pick in the 2010 draft and cash considerations on June 21, 2010 from Portland in exchange for the 34th pick in the 2010 draft. Previously, Portland acquired 2009 and 2010 second-round picks from Chicago in a three-team trade on June 26, 2008.

==== Draft-day trades ====
The following trades involving drafted players were made on the day of the draft.

- ^{B} Portland acquired Ryan Gomes and the draft rights to 16th pick Luke Babbitt from Minnesota in exchange for Martell Webster.
- ^{L 1} ^{2} Indiana acquired the draft rights to 51st pick Magnum Rolle from Oklahoma City in exchange for the draft rights to 57th pick Ryan Reid.

== Awards and honors ==
=== All WAC teams ===
First team
Luke Babbitt, Nevada
Jahmar Young, New Mexico State
Adrian Oliver, San Jose State
Jared Quayle, Utah State
Tai Wesley, Utah State

Second team
Paul George, Fresno State
Kyle Gibson, Louisiana Tech
Magnum Rolle, Louisiana Tech
Armon Johnson, Nevada
Jonathan Gibson, New Mexico State

Honorable mention
Daequon Montreal, Boise State
Sylvester Seay, Fresno State
Roderick Flemings, Hawai'i
Mac Hopson, Idaho
Wendell McKines, New Mexico State

All–defensive team
Marvin Jefferson, Idaho
Kyle Gibson, Louisiana Tech
Magnum Rolle, Louisiana Tech
Dario Hunt, Nevada
Pooh Williams, Utah State

All–newcomer team
Daequon Montreal, Boise State
Greg Smith, Fresno State
DeAndre Brown, Louisiana Tech
Nate Bendall, Utah State
Brian Green, Utah State

Player of the year
Luke Babbitt, Nevada
Freshman of the year
Greg Smith, Fresno State
Don Haskins coach of the year
Stew Morrill, Utah State
