= List of Kansas City Roos men's basketball head coaches =

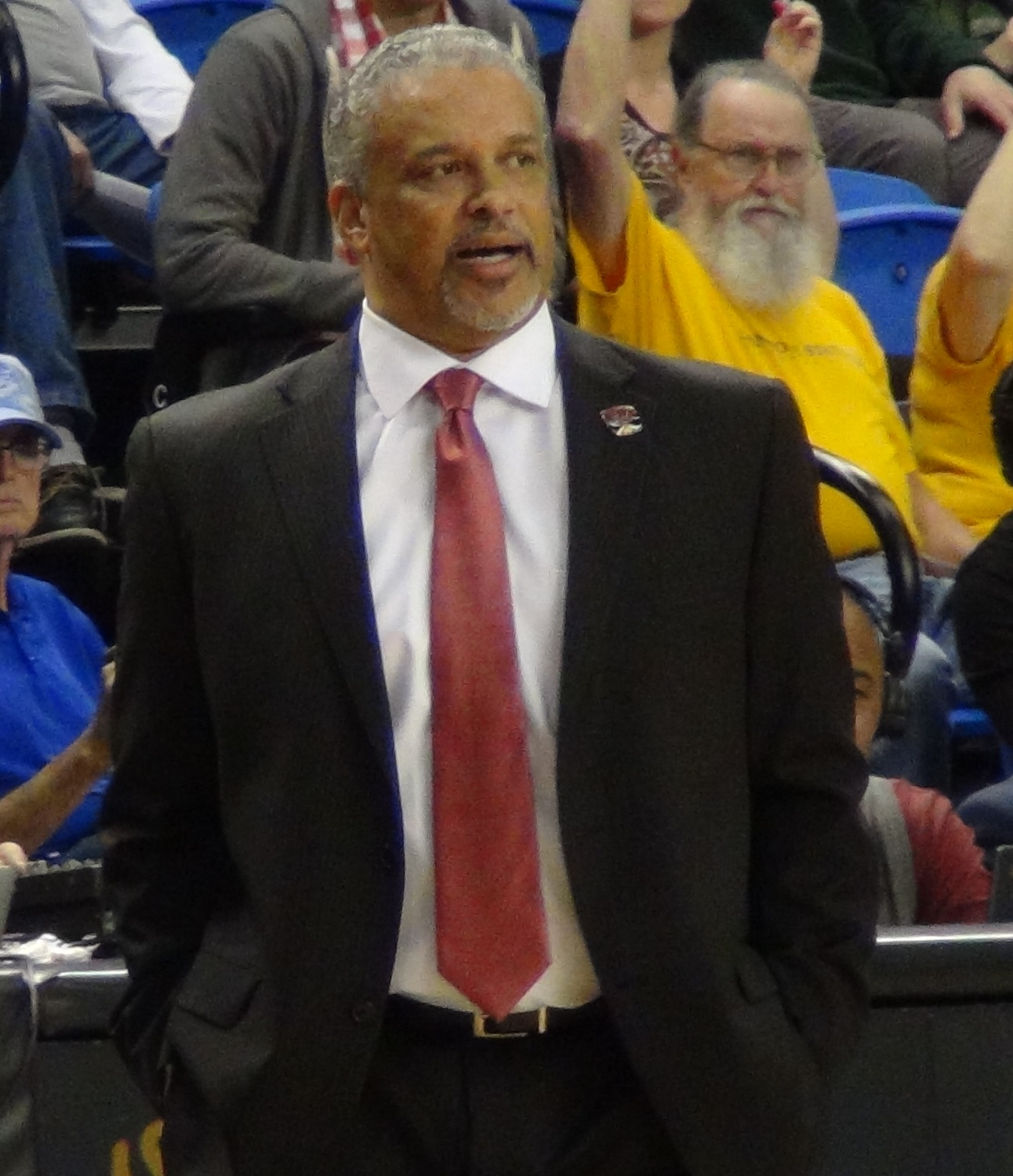
Marvin Menzies, the current head coach of the Kansas City Roos.

The following is a list of Kansas City Roos men's basketball head coaches. There have been 12 head coaches of the Roos in their 55-season history.

Kansas City's current head coach is Marvin Menzies. He was hired as the Roos' head coach in April 2022, replacing Billy Donlon, who left to join the coaching staff at Clemson.

No.	Tenure	Coach	Years	Record	Pct.
1	1969–1973; 1985–1986	Bill Ross	5	78–63	.553
2	1973–1980	Darrell Corwin	7	118–78	.602
3	1980–1983	Byron Lehman	3	28–45	.384
4	1983–1985	Bruce Carrier	2	50–22	.694
5	1987–1996	Lee Hunt	9	113–135	.456
6	1996–2000	Bob Sundvold	4	43–70	.381
7	2000–2001	Dean Demopoulos	1	14–16	.467
8	2001–2007	Rich Zvosec	6	84–91	.480
9	2007–2013 (Note: Kansas City vacated two wins each in the 2007–08 and 2008–09 seasons. Brown's on-court record was 64–122 (.344).)	Matt Brown	6	60–122	.330
10	2013–2019	Kareem Richardson	6	75–118	.389
11	2019–2022	Billy Donlon	3	46–39	.541
12	2022–present	Marvin Menzies	3	40–57	.412
Totals		12 coaches	55 seasons	749–856	.467
Records updated through end of 2024–25 season Source
