= 2009–10 Hawaii Rainbow Warriors basketball team =

American college basketball season

2009–10 Hawaii Rainbow Warriors men's basketball
- Conference: Western Athletic Conference
- Record: 10–20 (3–13 WAC)
- Head coach: Bob Nash
- Assistant coaches: Jackson Wheeler; Larry Farmer; Eran Ganot
- Home arena: Stan Sheriff Center

2009–10 WAC men's basketball standings
	Conf.				Overall
Team	W		L	PCT	W		L	PCT
Utah State	14	–	2	.875	27	–	7	.794
Nevada	11	–	5	.688	21	–	13	.618
New Mexico State†	11	–	5	.688	22	–	11	.667
Louisiana Tech	9	–	7	.563	24	–	11	.686
Fresno State	7	–	9	.438	15	–	18	.455
San Jose State	6	–	10	.375	14	–	17	.452
Idaho	6	–	10	.375	15	–	16	.484
Boise State	5	–	11	.313	15	–	17	.469
Hawai'i	3	–	13	.188	10	–	20	.333
† 2010 WAC tournament winner Rankings from AP Poll

The 2009–10 Hawaiʻi Rainbow Warriors basketball team represented the University of Hawaiʻi during the 2009–10 men's college basketball season. This was Bob Nash's third and final season as head coach as he was fired at the end of the season. The Warriors played their home games at the Stan Sheriff Center and competed in the Western Athletic Conference. The Rainbow Warriors finished the season 10–20 and 3–13 in WAC play to finish ninth and failed to qualify for the 2010 WAC men's basketball tournament.

== Pre-season ==
In the WAC preseason polls, released October 20 via media teleconference Hawai'i was selected to finish 9th in the coaches and media polls. Sr. Roderick Flemings was selected to the coaches All-WAC second team.

== 2009–10 Team ==
=== Roster ===
#	Name	Height	Weight (lbs.)	Position	Class	Hometown	Previous Team(s)
1	Petras Balocka	6'8"	250	C	Sr.	Vilnius, Lithuania	Community Christian School; Pensacola JC
2	Hiram Thompson	6'2"	175	G	Jr.	Sacramento, California	Oak Ridge HS
3	Zane Johnson	6'6"	210	G	Jr.	Phoenix, Arizona	Thunderbird HS; Arizona
5	Dwain Williams	6'0"	175	G	Jr.	San Diego, California	Vista Murrieta HS; Providence
12	Rykin Enos	5'11"	190	G	So.	Aiea, Hawaii	Kamehameha Schools
15	Beau Albrechtson	6'4"	205	G	So.	Honolulu, Hawaii	Kaimuki HS
20	Jeremy Lay	6'0"	185	G	Jr.	Oklahoma City, Oklahoma	Southeast HS; Northern Oklahoma-Enid
21	Paul Campbell	6'10"	215	C	Sr.	Toronto, Ontario	Northview Heights SS; Arkansas-Fort Smith
22	Leroy Lutu	6'3"	200	G	So.	Mercer Island, Washington	Mercer Island HS
23	Roderick Flemings	6'7"	210	G	Sr.	Dallas, Texas	DeSoto HS; Weatherford JC
24	Adhar Mayen	6'8"	195	F	Sr.	Pflugerville, Texas	Pflugerville HS; Hill CC
25	Ji Xiang	6'10"	240	F	So.	Zhengzhou, Henan	Zhengzhou No. 11 Middle School
32	Brandon Adams	6'7"	220	F	Sr.	Seattle, Washington	San Ramon Valley HS; Diablo Valley College
33	Aleksandar Milovic	6'7"	220	F	So.	Cetinje, Montenegro	Gymnasium; Duquesne
34	Douglas Kurtz	7'0"	265	C	Jr.	Pelotas, Rio Grande do Sul, Brazil	Universitario in Porto Alegre; Marshalltown CC
41	Bill Amis	6'9"	220	F	Sr.	Oklahoma City, Oklahoma	Putnam City HS; Pratt CC

=== Coaching staff ===
Name	Position	Year at Hawai'i	Alma Mater (Year)
Bob Nash	Head coach	3rd as HC/31st overall	Hawai'i (1984)
Jackson Wheeler	Associate head coach	20th	Marymount (1982)
Larry Farmer	Assistant coach	3rd	UCLA (1973)
Eran Ganot	Assistant coach	4th	Swarthmore College (2003)
Tim Shepherd	Director of Basketball Operations	2nd	Chaminade (2004)

== 2009–10 schedule and results ==
- All times are Hawaiian

Date time, TV	Rank^{#}	Opponent^{#}	Result	Record	Site (attendance) city, state
Exhibition
Fri, Oct 30; 7:05pm		Hawai'i-Hilo	W 76–65		Stan Sheriff Center (5,057); Honolulu, Hawaii
Thu, Nov 5; 7:05pm		BYU-Hawai'i	W 83–69		Stan Sheriff Center (5,575); Honolulu, Hawaii
Regular Season
Fri, Nov 13*; 7:35pm, KFVE		Southern Utah; Rainbow Classic	W 65–48	1–0	Stan Sheriff Center (5,707); Honolulu, Hawaii
Sun, Nov 15*; 5:05pm, KFVE		McNesse State; Rainbow Classic	W 73–65	2–0	Stan Sheriff Center (5,322); Honolulu, Hawaii
Mon, Nov 16*; 11:00pm, ESPN		Northern Colorado; Rainbow Classic/ ESPN College Hoops Tip-Off Marathon	L 75–81	2–1	Stan Sheriff Center (6,134); Honolulu, Hawaii
Fri, Nov 20*; 7:05pm, KFVE		Brigham Young	L 65–83	2–2	Stan Sheriff Center (5,891); Honolulu, Hawaii
Fri, Nov 27*; 8:05pm		New Mexico	L 71–83	2–3	Stan Sheriff Center (5,256); Honolulu, Hawaii
Wed, Dec 2*; 5:05pm		at UC Irvine	L 70–80	2–4	Bren Events Center (1,248); Irvine, California
Sun, Dec 6*; 5:05pm		Lamar	W 96–78	3–4	Stan Sheriff Center (5,096); Honolulu, Hawaii
Wed, Dec 9*; 7:05pm, KFVE		Chaminade	W 70–61	4–4	Stan Sheriff Center (5,057); Honolulu, Hawaii
Sat, Dec 12*; 7:05pm		Chicago State	W 83–58	5–4	Stan Sheriff Center (5,158); Honolulu, Hawaii
Tue, Dec 22*; 7:30pm, ESPNU		Coll. of Charleston; Diamond Head Classic	W 84–71	6–4	Stan Sheriff Center (7,119); Honolulu, Hawaii
Wed, Dec 23*; 6:30pm, ESPN2		UNLV; Diamond Head Classic	L 53–77	6–5	Stan Sheriff Center (NA); Honolulu, Hawaii
Fri, Dec 25*; 2:30pm, ESPN2		Saint Mary's; Diamond Head Classic	L 75–84	6–6	Stan Sheriff Center (NA); Honolulu, Hawaii
Mon, Dec 28*; 7:05pm		Northwestern State	W 81–62	7–6	Stan Sheriff Center (5,770); Honolulu, Hawaii
Sat, Jan 2; 7:05pm, KFVE		Idaho	L 52–59	7–7 (0–1)	Stan Sheriff Center (5,611); Honolulu, Hawaii
Mon, Jan 4; 7:05pm, KFVE		Boise State	W 76–68	8–7 (1–1)	Stan Sheriff Center (5,119); Honolulu, Hawaii
Sat, Jan 9; 5:00pm		at Fresno State	L 64–78	8–8 (1–2)	Save Mart Center (8,193); Fresno, California
Mon, Jan 11; 4:00pm		at Utah State	L 54–98	8–9 (1–3)	Smith Spectrum (9,888); Logan, Utah
Sun, Jan 17; 7:05pm, KFVE		San Jose State	W 68–67	9–9 (2–3)	Stan Sheriff Center (5,723); Honolulu, Hawaii
Thu, Jan 21; 7:05pm, KFVE		New Mexico State	L 69–71	9–10 (2–4)	Stan Sheriff Center (5,288); Honolulu, Hawaii
Sat, Jan 23; 7:05pm, KFVE		Louisiana Tech	L 60–65	9–11 (2–5)	Stan Sheriff Center (5,857); Honolulu, Hawaii
Thu, Jan 28; 5:00pm		at San Jose State	L 60–83	9–12 (2–6)	The Event Center (2,651); San Jose, California
Sat, Jan 30; 5:05pm		at Nevada	L 60–66	9–13 (2–7)	Lawlor Events Center (7,490); Reno, Nevada
Sat, Feb 6; 8:05pm, KFVE		Fresno State	L 51–61	9–14 (2–8)	Stan Sheriff Center (5,456); Honolulu, Hawaii
Sat, Feb 13; 4:00pm, KFVE		at Louisiana Tech	L 60–66	9–15 (2–9)	Thomas Assembly Center (2,096); Ruston, Louisiana
Mon, Feb 15; 4:00pm		at New Mexico State	L 64–88	9–16 (2–10)	Pan American Center (5,561); Las Cruces, New Mexico
Sat, Feb 20*; 8:00pm		Cal Poly	L 89–102	9–17	Stan Sheriff Center (5,381); Honolulu, Hawaii
Thu, Feb 25; 7:05pm, KFVE		Utah State	L 50–61	9–18 (2–11)	Stan Sheriff Center (5,446); Honolulu, Hawaii
Sat, Feb 27; 7:05pm, KFVE		Nevada	W 74–63	10–18 (3–11)	Stan Sheriff Center (6,025); Honolulu, Hawaii
Thu, Mar 4; 4:05pm		at Boise State	L 63–82	10–19 (3–12)	Taco Bell Arena (2,183); Boise, Idaho
Sat, Mar 6; 3:05pm		at Idaho	L 69–78	10–20 (3–13)	Cowan Spectrum (1,502); Moscow, Idaho
*Non-conference game. ^{#}Rankings from AP Poll. (#) Tournament seedings in parentheses.
