= Magnum Rolle =

Bahamian basketball player (born 1986)

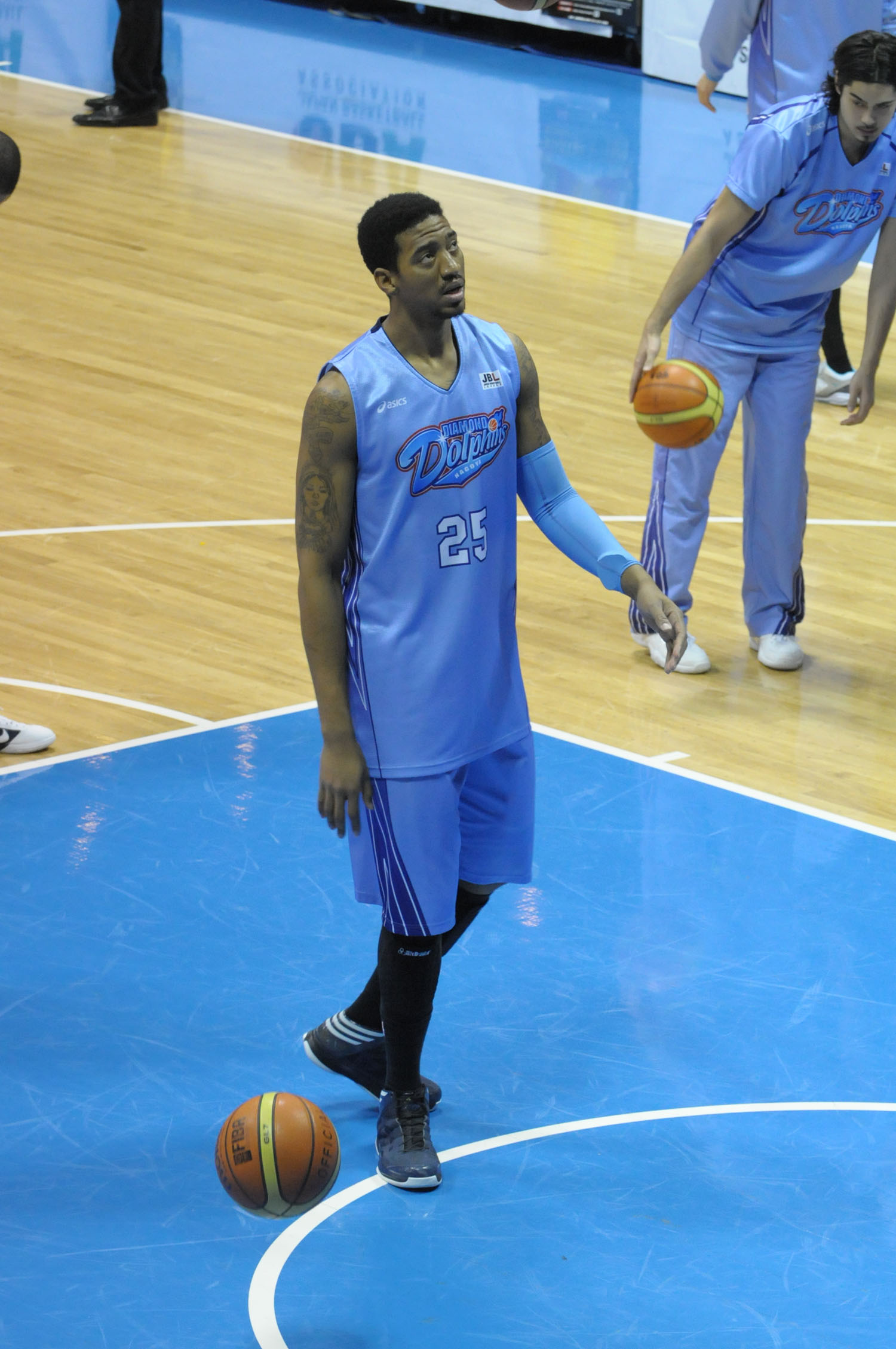

Personal information
- Born: February 23, 1986 (age 40) Freeport, The Bahamas
- Listed height: 6 ft 11 in (2.11 m)
- Listed weight: 235 lb (107 kg)

Career information
- High school: St. George’s (Freeport, The Bahamas); Laurinburg Institute (Laurinburg, North Carolina)
- College: LSU (2005–2007); Louisiana Tech (2008–2010)
- NBA draft: 2010: 2nd round, 51st overall pick
- Drafted by: Oklahoma City Thunder
- Playing career: 2010–2017
- Position: Power forward / center

Career history
- 2010–2011: Maine Red Claws
- 2012–2014: Mitsubishi Diamond Dolphins
- 2014–2015: Bnei Herzliya
- 2015: Indios de Mayagüez
- 2015: Yulon Dinos
- 2016: Passlab Yamagata Wyverns
- 2016–2017: Nakhon Pathom Mad Goat

Career highlights
- Second-team All-WAC (2010); WAC All-Newcomer Team (2009); 2× WAC All-Defensive Team (2009, 2010)
- Stats at NBA.com
- Stats at Basketball Reference
Medals
Men's basketball
Representing Bahamas
FIBA CBC Championship
| Gold medal – first place | 2014 Tortola | Bahamas |

Magnum Rolle (born February 23, 1986) is a Bahamian former professional basketball player who last played for the Nakhon Pathom Mad Goat of the Thailand Basketball League. Born in Freeport, Bahamas, Rolle did not play basketball until his freshman year of high school and was taught by his coach at St. George's High School, Darrel Sears. After his senior year at St. George's, Rolle transferred to the Laurinburg Institute in North Carolina, where he was an integral part in leading the team to an undefeated record and the national prep school championship. He was considered a five-star prospect out of Laurinburg, and committed to play at Louisiana State University (LSU).

Rolle came off the bench on a team that reached the Final Four in his freshman campaign. After his sophomore year, he transferred to Louisiana Tech in 2007 and was forced to skip the 2007–08 season as a redshirt. While a junior, Rolle tripled his points-per-game average from 4.0 to 12.2. He was named to the All-WAC (Western Athletic Conference) Defensive Team and All-WAC Newcomer Team. In his senior year, he led the WAC in blocks and finished fourth in career blocked shots at Louisiana Tech despite playing only two seasons.

He was drafted with the 51st overall pick in the 2010 NBA draft by the Oklahoma City Thunder and was subsequently traded to the Indiana Pacers. Rolle was waived by the Pacers on October 25, at the end of training camp and was later chosen with the third overall pick in 2010 NBA Development League Draft by the Maine Red Claws.

== Early life ==
Rolle was born on February 23, 1986, in Freeport, Bahamas. His mother is Maryse Rolle, a painter, and he has one sibling. He was named after Tom Selleck's TV show Magnum, P.I. He can trace his ancestry to freed slaves and is a distant cousin of National Football League (NFL) players Myron, Antrel, and Samari Rolle.

Originally a soccer player, Rolle did not play basketball until he was 15, when local coach Darrel Sears saw him walking across a basketball court and saw Rolle's great height. Sears asked if he knew how to play; Rolle said no. Sears asked him to try shooting from the foul line. His first shot, according to Rolle, completely missed the backboard and fell into the bushes behind it. At the time Rolle was not interested in the game and only attended Sears' practices because free fried chicken was provided.

== High school and prep school career ==
At St. George's High School in Freeport, Rolle quickly developed his basketball skills and also competed in track and field events. He averaged 20.3 points and 13.6 rebounds per game while enrolled at that school. Rolle first dreamed of playing in the National Basketball Association (NBA) when he was 16 years old, after he came back from a basketball camp in Arkansas, but had some academic issues to work out. Rolle's grade point average (GPA) was 1.0 early in his career at St. George's, forcing him to repeat ninth grade. Due to a drive to succeed academically and athletically, he eventually raised his GPA to 3.0.

In 2003, following his senior year at St. George's, Rolle attended the Nike All-America Camp and convinced his mother to let him attend a preparatory school in the United States, where he could showcase his abilities and hone his talents. They eventually settled on the Laurinburg Institute, a small school in North Carolina founded in 1904. Due to an unrepaired leak, the school's gymnasium was condemned in 1997, and the basketball team was forced to play home games as far as 30 miles (48 km) away. In Rolle's only year at the institute, his team went 40–0 and won the national prep school championship. Under head coach Chris Chaney, Rolle recorded a per-game average of 10.1 points, 10.2 rebounds, and 4.5 blocked shots and had a field goal and free throw percentage of 64 percent and 76 percent, respectively.

Rolle also played with the Arkansas Wings on the Amateur Athletic Union (AAU) circuit while at the Laurinburg Institute. He received scholarship offers from Arizona, Florida State, Kansas, Kentucky, LSU, and North Carolina. After verbally committing to Florida State in March 2004, Rolle reopened his recruitment in July. He decided on LSU, to which fellow Laurinburg teammate Chris Johnson had already committed, and signed his letter of intent on November 18, 2004. Rolle was listed as the eighth-best power forward in the class of 2005 and 32nd overall recruit by Rivals.com.

College recruiting
| Name | Hometown | School | Height | Weight | Commit date |
|---|---|---|---|---|---|
| Magnum Rolle; Power forward | Freeport, Bahamas | Laurinburg (NC) | 6 ft 9 in (2.06 m) | 209 lb (95 kg) | Sep 8, 2004 |
| Magnum Rolle; Power forward | Recruit ratings: Scout: Rivals: | | | | |
Overall recruit ranking: Scout: 7 (PF) Rivals: 32, 8 (PF)
Note: In many cases, Scout, Rivals, 247Sports, On3, and ESPN may conflict in their listings of height and weight.; In these cases, the average was taken. ESPN grades are on a 100-point scale.; Sources: "LSU Basketball Commitments". Rivals.; "2005 LSU Basketball Commits". Scout.; "ESPN". ESPN.; "Scout.com Team Recruiting Rankings". Scout.; "2005 Team Ranking". Rivals.

== College career ==
=== LSU ===
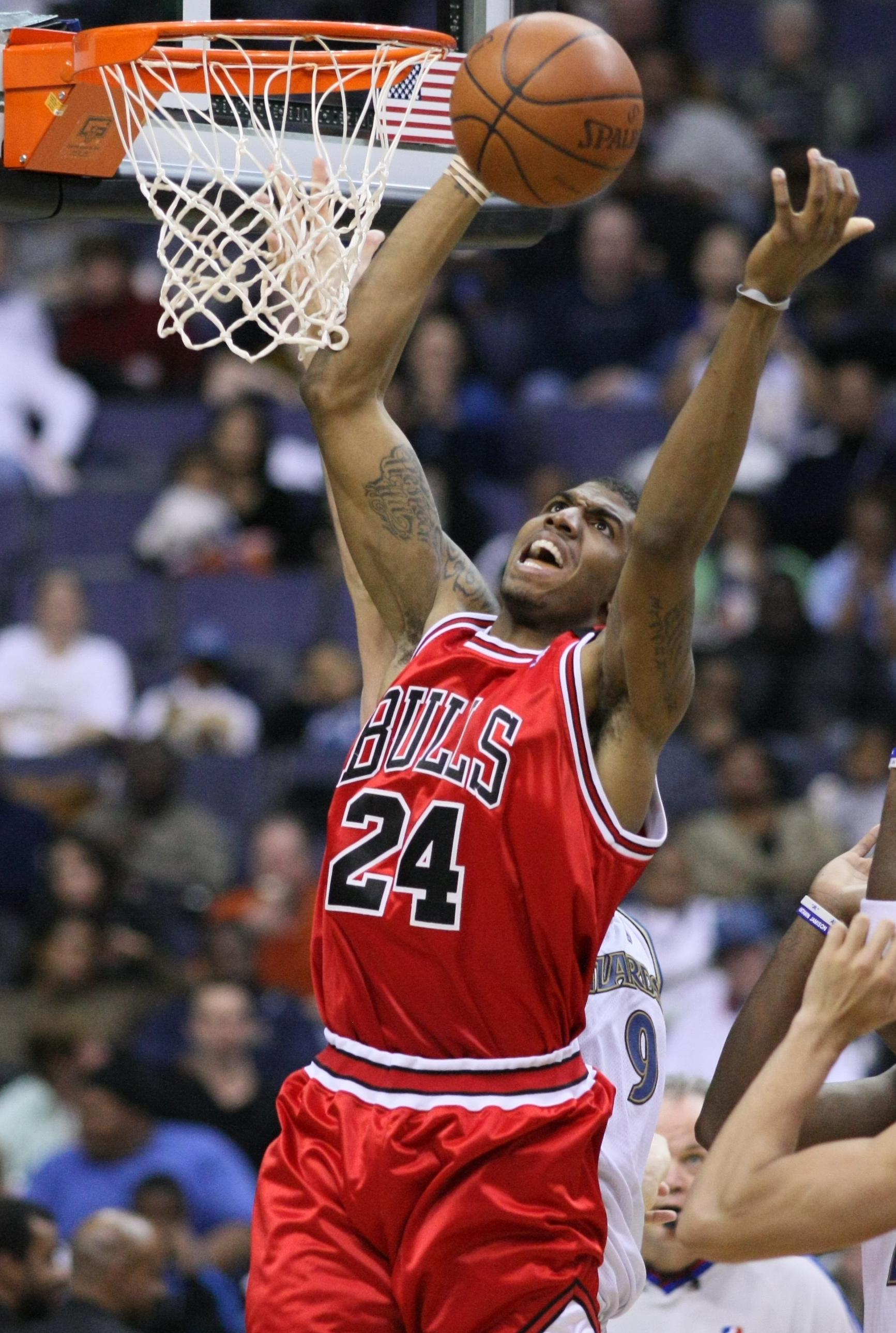
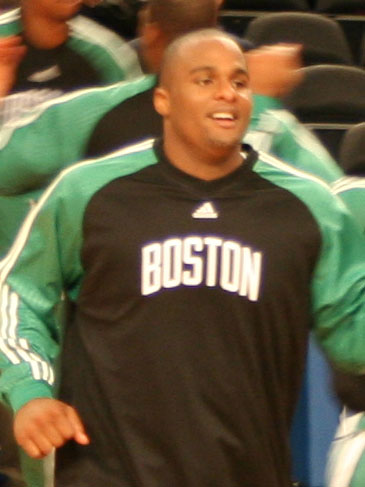
At LSU, Rolle played alongside Tyrus Thomas and Glen "Big Baby" Davis.

==== Freshman ====
On November 18, 2005, in an 84–56 defeat of Southern University, Rolle made his collegiate debut, playing 14 minutes and scoring six points while also grabbing three rebounds. Rolle shot 4-of-8 from the field and contributed season bests in rebounds (10) and points (8) to help lead LSU past Nicholls State. He equaled his season high in points against the Vanderbilt Commodores on February 2, 2006, in only nine minutes of playing time. The Tigers surprised many with a Final Four run, and in that game Rolle led the team in rebounds with eight, recorded two points from 1-of-1 shooting, and blocked a shot, all in 14 minutes of playing time. Despite this performance, LSU's opponent UCLA ultimately prevailed, 59–45. During the 2005–06 season, Rolle averaged 2.2 points, 2.5 rebounds, and 8.7 minutes per game as a freshman, picking up 21 blocks on the year.

==== Sophomore ====
Coming into the 2006–07 season, the Tigers returned four starters, including Glen "Big Baby" Davis, and LSU fans hoped that Rolle would replace the shot blocking skills of Tyrus Thomas, who had left early for the NBA. As such, Andy Katz of ESPN named them the fifth best team in the nation in the preseason. Rolle's averages improved slightly to 4.0 points, 4.1 rebounds, and 16.7 minutes per contest, with nine starts and 31 blocks. He had a season-best nine rebounds against Tulane on December 22, and recorded his first double-digit scoring night against the Tennessee Volunteers on March 8, 2007, in the SEC tournament, when he shot 5-for-7 from the field in 18 minutes for 10 points. However, two herniated discs in his back impeded further progress. The Tigers finished the year 17–15 and 5–11 in SEC play.

Rolle left the LSU program on May 23. LSU coach John Brady claimed this was due to concerns over Rolle's development. Darrel Sears, his former high school coach, said Rolle had been unhappy with LSU since December 2006, and that Brady had been making snide comments about Rolle for a while. After Rolle left LSU, he was courted by Division I schools Wyoming, Marshall, Oral Roberts, Delaware, Louisiana Tech, and South Florida. Although initially interested in South Florida due to its proximity to his Bahamas home, Rolle chose to transfer to Louisiana Tech to play under Kerry Rupp.

=== Louisiana Tech ===
==== Junior ====
Rolle was forced to redshirt the 2007–08 season due to transfer rules. In his first game as a Bulldog, on November 15, 2008, he registered nine rebounds and eight points, including four consecutive points within the last minute, to propel Louisiana Tech past Louisiana-Lafayette, 61–59. Rolle's first double-double came against Grambling State on November 18, with 12 points and 14 rebounds. He led the team in scoring with a then-career high of 17 points in a blowout 78–55 loss to #10 UCLA on December 28, while also contributing seven rebounds. On January 29, 2009, Rolle had a perfect night from the field, shooting 11-for-11 with 23 points. In a 60–52 defeat at the hands of Utah State on February 7, Rolle fell and injured his hip early in the game, but he came back later to finish with eight points. He had a season high 25 points to go along with 11 rebounds and four blocked shots in leading the Bulldogs to a victory over Murray State 69–60 on February 21. In the next game, an 80–71 win over New Mexico State, Rolle equalled his season high in points (25) and grabbed 12 rebounds.

During the 2008–09 season, Rolle started 30 games for the Bulldogs and averaged 12.2 points, 7.2 rebounds, and 1.7 blocks per game. He registered five double-doubles while scoring in excess of 10 points on 18 occasions. After the season, Rolle was named to the All-WAC Defensive Team and All-WAC Newcomer Team. In addition, the Louisiana Sports Writers Association recognized Rolle as a member of the All-Louisiana third team. Louisiana Tech teammate Kyle Gibson was named to its first team.

Rolle briefly flirted with the 2009 NBA draft. He declared for early entry in the draft, but did not hire an agent. After talking to NBA spokespeople, who said he was a borderline second-round selection, Rolle considered staying in college an extra year to earn a degree. He eventually pulled his name out of the draft, thus ensuring his college eligibility.

==== Senior ====
The WAC preseason polls were released on October 29, and Louisiana Tech was predicted to finish sixth in the media poll and fifth in the coaches poll. Fellow senior Gibson was named to the preseason All-WAC second team, but Rolle was not honored by any preseason award. In the Bulldogs' home opener against Arkansas-Little Rock, Rolle was the leader in scoring with 23 points in crushing the Trojans 86–66. Gibson and Olu Ashaolu also scored more than 20 points to push Louisiana Tech to a 4–1 start, their best since 2001. Rolle's career high in points was 29, scored against Houston in a 99–94 defeat of the Cougars on December 29; Rolle also grabbed 10 boards. In the semifinal of the WAC tournament, against the #1 seeded Utah State Aggies, Rolle injured his ankle less than three minutes into the game, a factor in the Bulldogs' 30-point loss. They finished the regular season 23–10, including a 9–7 record in conference. That was good enough for an invitation to the 2010 CollegeInsider.com Tournament (CIT), in which Louisiana Tech defeated Southern Miss in the first round despite missing Rolle. In Rolle's final collegiate game, he contributed nine points off the bench despite a 69–40 rout of the Bulldogs by Missouri State in the CIT's quarterfinals.

During the 2009–10 season, Rolle started 33 games, in 24 of which he scored in double figures and in 11 of which he had double-doubles. He rejected more shots than anyone else in the WAC, averaging 2.1 blocks per game, and finished fourth in career blocked shots at Louisiana Tech despite playing there for only two seasons. Rolle also posted averages of 8.4 rebounds per game, third in the WAC (behind Luke Babbitt of Nevada and Chis Oakes of San Jose State), and 13.9 points per game, 12th in the WAC. His field goal percentage was 51.1, tied with Babbitt for third in conference and behind Tai Wesley of Utah State and Ike Okoye of Boise State. At the conclusion of the season, Rolle was named to the Lefty Driesell All-America Defensive Team, All-WAC Defensive Team, All-WAC Second Team, and All-Louisiana Second Team. He graduated from Louisiana Tech with a bachelor's degree in sociology in March 2010, becoming the first person in his family to earn a degree.

== Professional career ==
=== NBA draft ===
Prior to the 2010 NBA draft, Rolle hired Fletcher Cockrell to be his agent. ESPN, NBADraft.net, and DraftExpress.com projected him to be a possible mid-to-late second-round selection. He worked out with the Washington Wizards, Phoenix Suns, Milwaukee Bucks, Charlotte Bobcats, and Indiana Pacers. Dave-Te' Thomas of CBS Sports said that Rolle had a good wingspan and was very athletic. He added while larger NBA forwards might push him around, he was an intense player and would not back down if challenged. Thomas compared Rolle to former LSU teammate Tyrus Thomas.

On June 25, Rolle was chosen with the 51st overall pick by the Oklahoma City Thunder. His rights were traded to the Pacers for Ryan Reid, who was the 57th overall pick, along with undisclosed cash considerations. Rolle was the first NBA player drafted out of Louisiana Tech since Paul Millsap was picked by the Utah Jazz with the 47th pick of the 2006 NBA draft. In addition, he was the first Grand Bahamian selected in the draft. Bahamas Minister of Youth Sports and Culture Charles Maynard and Minister of Works and Transport Neko C Grant congratulated Rolle on his historic achievement.

=== Indiana Pacers ===
==== Summer League ====
He's been by far the best player by a large margin (in camp). He has dominated everything. He has scored. He has rebounded. He has defended well. He has a surprisingly high basketball IQ. He shoots really well and pursues every offensive rebound.

— Former Indiana Pacers coach Jim O'Brien, speaking of Magnum Rolle

Rolle played well in the 2010 Orlando Summer League, garnering averages of 28 minutes, 13.4 points, seven rebounds, and two blocked shots per game. On opening day of the summer league, the Pacers beat the Orlando Magic 86–77 behind Rolle's 13 points, five rebounds, two blocks, and a steal. In the second game, an 80–69 loss to the New Jersey Nets, Rolle scored nine points, brought down three rebounds, and rejected three shots. Against the Utah Jazz, Rolle's 10 points, eight rebounds, and four blocks facilitated an 83–74 Pacers win. The fourth game, which The Bahamas Tribune said was the most thrilling of the summer league, featured a 27-point deficit erased by Indiana for a comeback win over the Boston Celtics. Rolle had a double-double, with 19 points and 11 boards. The Pacers and him wrapped up the Orlando Summer League with a 77–73 defeat by the Oklahoma City Thunder, in which Rolle posted 16 points, eight rebounds and two blocks.

==== Training camp ====
Rolle, along with fellow Pacer rookie Lance Stephenson, was named one of the "steals of the draft" by The Boston Globe. Rolle was invited to the Pacers' training camp, where he injured his head, requiring stitches. On September 28, the Pacers announced they had officially signed Rolle to a two-year contract, but his salary was not disclosed. In five preseason games, he averaged 1.8 points per game and 1.4 rebounds per game.

However, he was waived on October 25, at the end of training camp, in order to shrink the roster to NBA-mandated 15 players. The Pacers tried to trade Dahntay Jones and Solomon Jones to keep Rolle, but the trade fell through and the Pacers were reluctant to drop Solomon Jones due to a lack of depth in the frontcourt. Had he made the roster, Rolle would have earned $510,000, but instead he made $50,000 in a buyout.

=== Maine Red Claws ===
In the 2010 NBA Development League Draft, held on November 1, Rolle was chosen with the third overall pick by the Maine Red Claws. The Red Claws were the affiliated team of the Boston Celtics and the Charlotte Bobcats. According to Red Claws general manager Jon Jennings, several D-League teams thought he had the most upside of anyone on the draft.

On November 26, Rolle was waived by the Red Claws because of a knee injury which was due to keep Rolle out 'indefinitely'. In two games with the Red Claws, Rolle averaged 7.5 points, 3.5 rebounds and 3.5 blocks per game. His rights were retained by the Red Claws.

On March 3, 2011, he returned to the Red Claws. He played 13 more games with the Red Claws before he was called up to the Atlanta Hawks. Overall, he averaged 14.1 points and 5.5 rebounds in 25.9 minutes per game with the Red Claws.

=== Atlanta Hawks ===
On April 11, 2011, Rolle signed with the Atlanta Hawks but did not play a game with Atlanta during the 2010–11 season. During the 2011 NBA lockout, he signed with South Korean team Changwon LG Sakers but also did not appear in a game with Changwon.

After the lockout ended, Rolle returned to the Hawks for the training camp. However, he was released before the start of the season.

=== Orlando Magic ===
In July 2012, Rolle joined the Orlando Magic for the 2012 NBA Summer League.

=== Japan ===
In August 2012, Rolle signed with the Mitsubishi Diamond Dolphins of the Japanese Basketball League for the 2012–13 season.

In 2013, he re-signed with the Dolphins for the 2013–14 season. in just his second year became an NBL Allstar and led his team to the playoffs. Rolle also led the league in scoring in the Emperors Cup tournament, advancing to the final four top teams.

=== Thailand ===
In June 2016, Rolle signed with MadGoats Basketball Club of the Thailand Basketball League, where he finished as the league's MVP

== Career statistics ==
=== NCAA ===
College statistics

Legend
| GP | Games played | GS | Games started | MPG | Minutes per game |
| FG% | Field goal percentage | 3P% | 3-point field goal percentage | FT% | Free throw percentage |
| RPG | Rebounds per game | APG | Assists per game | SPG | Steals per game |
| BPG | Blocks per game | PPG | Points per game | **Bold** | Career high |

| Year | Team | GP | GS | MPG | FG% | 3P% | FT% | RPG | APG | SPG | BPG | PPG |
|---|---|---|---|---|---|---|---|---|---|---|---|---|
| 2005–06 | LSU Tigers | 33 | 0 | 8.7 | .432 | .000 | .458 | 2.5 | 0.2 | 0.3 | 0.6 | 2.2 |
| 2006–07 | LSU Tigers | 29 | 9 | 16.7 | .431 | .000 | .556 | 4.1 | 0.4 | 0.6 | 1.1 | 4.0 |
| 2007–08 | Louisiana Tech Bulldogs | 0 | 0 | 0.0 | .000 | .000 | .000 | 0.0 | 0.0 | 0.0 | 0.0 | 0.0 |
| 2008–09 | Louisiana Tech Bulldogs | 30 | 30 | 28.2 | **.530** | **.500** | .654 | 7.2 | **1.0** | **0.9** | 1.7 | 12.2 |
| 2009–10 | Louisiana Tech Bulldogs | **34** | **33** | **30.1** | .514 | .000 | **.660** | **8.4** | 0.8 | 0.8 | **2.1** | **13.9** |
