= 2009–10 New Mexico State Aggies men's basketball team =

American college basketball season

2009–10 New Mexico State Aggies men's basketball

WAC Tournament Champions

NCAA tournament, Round of 64
- Conference: Western Athletic Conference
- Record: 22–12 (11–5 WAC)
- Head coach: Marvin Menzies (3rd season)
- Assistant coaches: Mick Durham; Chris Pompey; Paul Weir
- Home arena: Pan American Center

2009–10 WAC men's basketball standings
	Conf.				Overall
Team	W		L	PCT	W		L	PCT
Utah State	14	–	2	.875	27	–	7	.794
Nevada	11	–	5	.688	21	–	13	.618
New Mexico State†	11	–	5	.688	22	–	11	.667
Louisiana Tech	9	–	7	.563	24	–	11	.686
Fresno State	7	–	9	.438	15	–	18	.455
San Jose State	6	–	10	.375	14	–	17	.452
Idaho	6	–	10	.375	15	–	16	.484
Boise State	5	–	11	.313	15	–	17	.469
Hawai'i	3	–	13	.188	10	–	20	.333
† 2010 WAC tournament winner Rankings from AP Poll

The 2009–10 New Mexico State Aggies men's basketball team represented New Mexico State University in the 2009–10 college basketball season. This was Marvin Menzies 3rd season as head coach. The Aggies played their home games at the Pan American Center and competed in the Western Athletic Conference. They finished the season 22–12, 11–5 in WAC play. They won the 2010 WAC men's basketball tournament to earn the conference's automatic bid to the 2010 NCAA Division I men's basketball tournament. They earned a 12 seed in the Midwest Region where they were defeated by a 5 seed and AP #13 Michigan State in the first round.

== Pre-season ==
In the WAC preseason polls, released October 20 via media teleconference New Mexico State was selected to finish 3rd in the coaches and media poll. Jr. Jahmar Young was selected to the coaches and media All-WAC first team.

== 2009–10 Team ==
=== Roster ===
#	Name	Height	Weight (lbs.)	Position	Class	Hometown	Previous Team(s)
0	Tray Britt	6'3"	200	G	Sr.	Richmond, California	Hogan HS
1	Jahmar Young	6'5"	180	G	Jr.	Baltimore, Maryland	Laurinburg Prep
3	Da'Shawn Gomez	6'1"	180	G	Fr.	Inglewood, California	Inglewood HS
5	Lamine Diame	6'6"	200	F	Fr.	Saint-Louis, Senegal	De La Fosse
10	Bandja Sy	6'8"	210	F	Fr.	Cergy, France	Stoneridge Prep
11	Justin Standley	6'3"	190	G	Fr.	Oakland, California	McClymonds HS
13	Hernst Laroche	6'1"	165	G	So.	Montreal, Quebec	Page-Concordia; Vanier
15	Kelly Merker	6'4"	205	F	Sr.	Santa Fe, New Mexico	Monte del Sol HS
21	Makhtar Diop	6'6"	185	G	So.	Dakar, Senegal	St. Jeanne d'Arc Institute
22	Jonathan Gibson	6'1"	180	G	Sr.	West Covina, California	Calvary Christian Prep
24	Robert Lumpkins	6'7"	210	F	Jr.	Washington, D.C.	Kilgore College
31	Wendell McKines	6'6"	225	F	Jr.	Oakland, California	Richmond HS
32	Hamidu Rahman	6'11"	255	C	So.	Somerset, New Jersey	American Christian HS
33	Troy Gillenwater	6'8"	230	F	So.	Boston, Massachusetts	Stoneridge Prep
34	Aaron Gordo Castillo	6'5"	180	G	Jr.	Las Cruces, New Mexico	Las Cruces HS
35	B. J. West	6'11"	220	F	Fr.	Cheneyville, Louisiana	Rapides HS
45	Tyrone Watson	6'5"	225	F	Fr.	Hamilton, Ontario	Cathedral HS
55	Abdoulaye N'doye	7'0"	215	C	Fr.	Dakar, Senegal	ISM

=== Coaching staff ===
Name	Position	Year at NMSU	Alma Mater (Year)
Marvin Menzies	Head coach	3rd	UCLA (1987)
Mick Durham	Assistant coach	2nd	Montana State (1979)
Chris Pompey	Assistant coach	4th	Pittsburgh (1984)
Paul Weir	Assistant coach	3rd	York (2004)

== 2009–10 schedule and results ==
- All times are Mountain

Date time, TV	Rank^{#}	Opponent^{#}	Result	Record	Site (attendance) city, state
Exhibition
Mon, Nov 2; 7:00pm		Western New Mexico	W 111–83	–	Pan American Center (4,738); Las Cruces, New Mexico
Regular Season
Fri, Nov 13*; 9:30pm		at Saint Mary's	L 68–100	0–1	McKeon Pavilion (3,500); Moraga, California
Tue, Nov 17*; 7:00pm		New Mexico; Rio Grande Rivalry	L 87–97	0–2	Pan American Center (8,469); Las Cruces, New Mexico
Sat, Nov 21*; 2:00pm		Oklahoma Panhandle State	W 83–73	1–2	Pan American Center (4,738); Las Cruces, New Mexico
Tue, Nov 24*; 8:00pm		at Cal State Fullerton	L 73–84	1–3	Titan Gym (1,001); Fullerton, California
Thu, Nov 26*; 7:00pm		North Carolina A&T	W 84–68	2–3	Pan American Center (4,462); Las Cruces, New Mexico
Tue, Dec 1*; 7:00pm		UTEP; Battle of I-10	W 79–58	2–4	Pan American Center (7,195); Las Cruces, New Mexico
Sat, Dec 5*; 7:00pm, The Mtn.		at New Mexico; Rio Grande Rivalry	L 58–75	2–5	The Pit (14,586); Albuquerque, New Mexico
Sun, Dec 13*; 7:00pm		at UTEP; Battle of I-10	W 87–80	3–5	Don Haskins Center (10,459); El Paso, Texas
Tue, Dec 15*; 8:30pm		at UCLA	L 68–100	3–6	Pauley Pavilion (5,933); Los Angeles, California
Fri, Dec 18*; 8:30pm		at Pepperdine	W 78–72	4–6	Firestone Fieldhouse (471); Malibu, California
Mon, Dec 21*; 7:00pm		Alcorn State	W 97–72	5–6	Pan American Center (4,730); Las Cruces, New Mexico
Wed, Dec 23*; 7:00pm		Texas Southern; Lou Henson Classic	W 79–75	6–6	Pan American Center (4,781); Las Cruces, New Mexico
Mon, Dec 28*; 7:00pm		Prairie View A&M	W 95–76	7–6	Pan American Center (4,649); Las Cruces, New Mexico
Sat, Jan 2; 9:00pm, ESPNU		Utah State	W 55–52	8–6 (1–0)	Pan American Center (5,070); Las Cruces, New Mexico
Mon, Jan 4; 9:00pm, ESPNU		Nevada	L 67–77	8–7 (1–1)	Pan American Center (4,788); Las Cruces, New Mexico
Sat, Jan 9; 7:00pm		at Boise State	W 88–85	9–7 (2–1)	Taco Bell Arena (3,896); Boise, Idaho
Mon, Jan 11; 8:00pm		at Idaho	W 75–72	10–7 (3–1)	Cowan Spectrum (1,296); Moscow, Idaho
Sat, Jan 16; 7:00pm		Fresno State	W 86–77	11–7 (4–1)	Pan American Center (6,106); Las Cruces, New Mexico
Thu, Jan 21; 10:00pm		at Hawai'i	W 71–69	12–7 (5–1)	Stan Sheriff Center (5,288); Honolulu, Hawaii
Sat, Jan 23; 8:30pm		at San Jose State	L 84–93	12–8 (5–2)	The Event Center (2,285); San Jose, California
Sat, Jan 30; 7:00pm		at Louisiana Tech	W 91–77	13–8 (6–2)	Thomas Assembly Center (5,028); Ruston, Louisiana
Sat, Feb 6; 7:00pm		San Jose State	W 94–82	14–8 (7–2)	Pan American Center (6,255); Las Cruces, New Mexico
Mon, Feb 8; 7:00pm, ESPN+		Louisiana Tech	W 70–68	15–8 (8–2)	Pan American Center (5,549); Las Cruces, New Mexico
Thu, Feb 11; 8:00pm		at Fresno State	L 64–83	15–9 (8–3)	Save Mart Center (7,889); Fresno, California
Mon, Feb 15; 7:00pm		Hawai'i	W 88–64	16–9 (9–3)	Pan American Center (5,561); Las Cruces, New Mexico
Sat, Feb 20*; 8:00pm, ESPNU		at Pacific; ESPN BracketBusters	W 84–78	17–9	Alex G. Spanos Center (4,014); Stockton, California
Wed, Feb 24; 9:00pm, ESPN2		Idaho	W 74–57	18–9 (10–3)	Pan American Center (5,834); Las Cruces, New Mexico
Sat, Feb 27; 7:00pm		Boise State	W 95–92	19–9 (11–3)	Pan American Center (6,691); Las Cruces, New Mexico
Thu, Mar 4; 8:00pm		at Nevada	L 92–100	19–10 (11–4)	Lawlor Events Center (5,878); Reno, Nevada
Sat, Mar 6; 7:00pm		at Utah State	L 63–81	19–11 (11–5)	Smith Spectrum (10,270); Logan, Utah
2010 WAC men's basketball tournament
Thu, Mar 11; 9:30pm	(3)	vs. (6) San Jose State; Quarterfinals	W 90–69	20–11	Lawlor Events Center (NA); Reno, Nevada
Fri, Mar 12; 8:00pm, ESPN2	(3)	at (2) Nevada; Semifinals	W 80–79	21–11	Lawlor Events Center (5,897); Reno, Nevada
Sat, Mar 13; 7:00pm, ESPN2	(3)	vs. (1) Utah State; Championship Game	W 69–63	22–11	Lawlor Events Center (2,748); Reno, Nevada
2010 NCAA Division I men's basketball tournament
Fri, Mar 19*; 5:20pm, CBS	(12 MW)	vs. (5 MW) No. 13 Michigan State; First round	L 67–70	22–12	Spokane Arena (10,861); Spokane, Washington
*Non-conference game. ^{#}Rankings from AP Poll. (#) Tournament seedings in parentheses.

== Season highlights ==
On December 14, Jr. Jahmar Young was named the WAC player of the week for the fifth week of the season with weekly averages of 24.0 PPG, 1.0 RPG, 3.0 AST, and 47.0 FG%.

On February 1, So. Hamidu Rahman was named the WAC player of the week for the twelfth week of the season with weekly averages of 22.0 PPG, 12.0 RPG, and 66.7 FG%.

On February 8, Jr. Jahmar Young was named the WAC player of the week for the thirteenth week of the season with weekly averages of 25.0 PPG, 3.0 RPG, 5.0 AST, and 61.5 FG%.
