= 2009–10 Utah State Aggies men's basketball team =

American college basketball season

2009–10 Utah State Aggies men's basketball
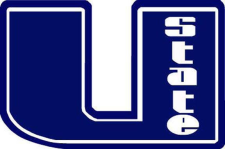

WAC Regular Season Champions

NCAA tournament, Round of 64
- Conference: Western Athletic Conference
- Record: 27–8 (14–2 WAC)
- Head coach: Stew Morrill
- Assistant coaches: Tim Duryea; Chris Jones; Tarvish Felton
- Home arena: Smith Spectrum

2009–10 WAC men's basketball standings
	Conf.				Overall
Team	W		L	PCT	W		L	PCT
Utah State	14	–	2	.875	27	–	7	.794
Nevada	11	–	5	.688	21	–	13	.618
New Mexico State†	11	–	5	.688	22	–	11	.667
Louisiana Tech	9	–	7	.563	24	–	11	.686
Fresno State	7	–	9	.438	15	–	18	.455
San Jose State	6	–	10	.375	14	–	17	.452
Idaho	6	–	10	.375	15	–	16	.484
Boise State	5	–	11	.313	15	–	17	.469
Hawai'i	3	–	13	.188	10	–	20	.333
† 2010 WAC tournament winner Rankings from AP Poll

The 2009–10 Utah State Aggies men's basketball team represented Utah State University in the 2009–10 college basketball season. This was head coach Stew Morrill's 12th season at Utah State. The Aggies played their home games at the Dee Glen Smith Spectrum and are members of the Western Athletic Conference. They finished the season 27–8, 14–2 to capture the regular season championship for the third consecutive year. They advanced to the championship game of the 2010 WAC men's basketball tournament before losing to New Mexico State. They received an at–large bid to the 2010 NCAA Division I men's basketball tournament, earning a 12 seed in the South Region, where they lost to 5 seed and AP #23 Texas A&M in the first round.

== Pre-season ==
In the WAC preseason polls, released October 20 via media teleconference, Utah State was selected to finish first in the coaches poll, receiving 8 first place votes, with Sr. guard Jared Quayle selected to the All-WAC first team and Jr. forward Tai Wesley selected to the All-WAC second team. They were also selected to finish 1st in the media poll, receiving 15 first place votes, with Jared Quayle selected to the All-WAC first team.

== 2009–10 Team ==
=== Roster ===
No.	Name	Ht.	Wt.	Position	Yr.	Hometown	Previous School(s)
2	Eaton, Preston	5' 10"	170	Guard	FR	Springville, Utah	Srpingville HS
5	Williams, Pooh	6' 3"	200	Guard/Forward	JR	Federal Way, WA	Federal Way HS
12	Green, Brian	6' 1"	195	Guard	JR	Kaysville, Utah	Davis HS, Salt Lake CC
13	Medlin, Preston	6' 4"	165	Guard	FR	Carrollton, Texas	Hebron HS
15	Niang, Modou	6' 10"	220	Center	SO	Richard Toll, Senegal	Hachioji (Tokyo, Japan)
21	Quayle, Jared	6' 1"	180	Guard	SR	Perry, Utah	Box Elder HS, Western Wyoming CC
22	Jardine, Brady	6' 7"	220	Forward	SO	Twin Falls, Idaho	Twin Falls HS
23	White, Tyrone	6' 6"	175	Forward	FR	Portland, Oregon	Jefferson HS, Air Force Prep
24	Newbold, Tyler	6' 4"	210	Guard	JR	Payson, Utah	Payson HS
25	Myaer, Jaxon	5' 9"	165	Guard	SO	Salt Lake City, Utah	Judge Memorial HS
30	Grim, Morgan	6' 8"	220	Forward	JR	Riverton, Utah	Riverton HS, Utah
35	Bendall, Nate	6' 9"	245	Forward	JR	Salt Lake City, Utah	Skyline HS, Salt Lake CC
42	Wesley, Tai	6' 7"	240	Forward	JR	Provo, Utah	Provo HS
44	Formisano, Matt	6' 8"	240	Forward	JR	Centennial, Colorado	Heritage HS
54	DiLoreto, Anthony	7' 1"	230	Center	FR	Minnetonka, Minnesota	Hopkins HS

(redshirt) Indicates Red Shirt Year

=== Coaching staff ===
Name	Position	Year at Utah State	Alma Mater (Year)
Stew Morrill	Head coach	12th	Gonzaga (1974)
Tim Duryea	Assistant coach	9th	North Texas (1988)
Chris Jones	Assistant coach	2nd	Utah (1994)
Tarvish Felton	Assistant coach	2nd	Southern Utah (1999)
Lance Beckert	Director of Basketball Operations	4th	Daito Bunka (Japan) (1997)

== 2009–10 schedule and results ==
- All times are Mountain

Date time, TV	Rank^{#}	Opponent^{#}	Result	Record	Site (attendance) city, state
Exhibition
Fri, Oct 30; 7:05pm		Northwest Nazarene	W 85–51		Smith Spectrum (8,641); Logan, Utah
Sat, Nov 7; 7:05pm		Asbury	W 65–40		Smith Spectrum (8,962); Logan, Utah
Regular Season
Fri, Nov 13*; 7:35pm		at Weber State	W 66–60	1–0	Dee Events Center (9,272); Ogden, Utah
Wed, Nov 18*; 6:05pm, The Mtn.		at Utah	L 67–68	1–1	Jon M. Huntsman Center (9,699); Salt Lake City, Utah
Sat, Nov 21*; 10:00am		at Northeastern	L 61–64	1–2	Matthews Arena (1,927); Boston, Massachusetts
Tue, Nov 24*; 7:05pm		Idaho State	W 77–44	2–2	Smith Spectrum (9,026); Logan, Utah
Sat, Nov 28*; 7:05pm, CW30		Southern Utah	W 89–49	3–2	Smith Spectrum (9,845); Logan, Utah
Wed, Dec 2*; 7:05pm, CW30		Brigham Young	W 71–61	4–2	Smith Spectrum (10,270); Logan, Utah
Sat, Dec 5*; 7:05pm, CW30		Saint Mary's	L 63–68	4–3	Smith Spectrum (10,270); Logan, Utah
Sat, Dec 12*; 7:05pm, CW30		Utah Valley	W 87–56	5–3	Smith Spectrum (9,147); Logan, Utah
Wed, Dec 16*; 8:05pm		at Cal State Bakersfield	W 68–51	6–3	Rabobank Arena (4,481); Bakersfield, California
Fri, Dec 18*; 8:05pm		at Long Beach State	L 62–75	6–4	Walter Pyramid (2,656); Long Beach, California
Mon, Dec 21*; 8:05pm		Morehead State; Basketball Travelers Invitational	W 79–72	7–4	Smith Spectrum (9,086); Logan, Utah
Tue, Dec 22*; 8:05pm		Cal State Fullerton; Basketball Travelers Invitational	W 83–60	8–4	Smith Spectrum (9,001); Logan, Utah
Wed, Dec 23*; 8:05pm		Weber State; Basketball Travelers Invitational	W 85–73	9–4	Smith Spectrum (9,427); Logan, Utah
Tue, Dec 29*; 7:05pm		Western Oregon	W 78–42	10–4	Smith Spectrum (9,368); Logan, Utah
Sat, Jan 2; 9:05pm, ESPNU		at New Mexico State	L 52–55	10–5 (0–1)	Pan American Center (5,070); Las Cruces, New Mexico
Mon, Jan 4; 6:05pm		at Louisiana Tech	L 60–82	10–6 (0–2)	Thomas Assembly Center (2,094); Ruston, Louisiana
Mon, Jan 11; 7:05pm		Hawai'i	W 98–54	11–6 (1–2)	Smith Spectrum (9,888); Logan, Utah
Wed, Jan 13; 9:05pm, ESPN2		at Nevada	W 79–72 ^{OT}	12–6 (2–2)	Lawlor Events Center (7,035); Reno, Nevada
Sat, Jan 16; 7:05pm, CW30		Boise State	W 81–59	13–6 (3–2)	Smith Spectrum (9,769); Logan, Utah
Thu, Jan 21; 8:05pm, ESPN Plus		at Fresno State	W 69–43	14–6 (4–2)	Save Mart Center (8,302); Fresno, California
Sat, Jan 23; 6:05pm, CW30		at Idaho	W 60–48	15–6 (5–2)	Cowan Spectrum (2,570); Moscow, Idaho
Sat, Jan 30; 7:05pm, CW30		San Jose State	W 77–58	16–6 (6–2)	Smith Spectrum (10,270); Logan, Utah
Wed, Feb 3; 9:05pm, ESPN2		Idaho	W 80–62	17–6 (7–2)	Smith Spectrum (9,777); Logan, Utah
Sat, Feb 6; 7:05pm, ESPNU		Nevada	W 76–65	18–6 (8–2)	Smith Spectrum (10,270); Logan, Utah
Thu, Feb 11; 7:05pm		at Boise State	W 72–67	19–6 (9–2)	Taco Bell Arena (3,064); Boise, Idaho
Sat, Feb 13; 8:05pm		at San Jose State	W 81–65	20–6 (10–2)	The Event Center (2,128); San Jose, California
Wed, Feb 17; 9:05pm, ESPN2		Louisiana Tech	W 67–61	21–6 (11–2)	Smith Spectrum (10,049); Logan, Utah
Sat, Feb 20*; 10:00pm, ESPN2		Wichita State; ESPN BracketBusters	W 68–58	22–6	Smith Spectrum (10,270); Logan, Utah
Thu, Feb 25; 10:05pm		at Hawai'i	W 61–50	23–6 (12–2)	Stan Sheriff Center (5,446); Honolulu, Hawaii
Mon, Mar 1; 7:05pm		Fresno State	W 76–39	24–6 (13–2)	Smith Spectrum (10,257); Logan, Utah
Sat, Mar 6; 7:05pm, CW30		New Mexico State	W 81–63	25–6 (14–2)	Smith Spectrum (10,270); Logan, Utah
2010 WAC men's basketball tournament
Thu, Mar 11; 1:00pm, ESPNU		vs. Boise State; Quarterfinals	W 84–60	26–6	Lawlor Events Center (NA); Reno, Nevada
Fri, Mar 12; 7:00pm		vs. Louisiana Tech; Semifinals	W 85–55	27–6	Lawlor Events Center (NA); Reno, Nevada
Sat, Mar 13; 8:00pm, ESPN2		vs. New Mexico State; Finals	L 63–69	27–7	Lawlor Events Center (2,748); Reno, Nevada
2010 NCAA Division I men's basketball tournament
Fri, Mar 19*; 2:45pm, CBS		vs. No. 23 Texas A&M; First Round	L 53–69	27–8	Spokane Arena (10,899); Spokane, Washington
*Non-conference game. ^{#}Rankings from AP Poll. (#) Tournament seedings in parentheses.

== Season highlights ==
The Aggies December 5 loss to Saint Mary's ended their 37-game home winning streak and their 65-game regular season home winning streak in non-conference games.

On December 28, Jr. Tai Wesley was named the WAC player of the week for the seventh week of the season with weekly averages of 16.7 PPG, 7.7 RPG, 4.0 AST, 1.7 blocks and 65.4 FG%.

On January 18, Sr. Jared Quayle was named the WAC player of the week for the tenth week of the season with weekly averages of 14.0 PPG, 5.3 RPG, 5.7 AST and 55.2 FG%.

With their win over Idaho on January 23, head coach Stew Morrill recorded his 500th career victory.

With their win over Hawai'i on February 25 the Aggies joined Gonzaga and Kansas as the only schools in the country to have 23 wins or more every season since 2000.

On March 7, Jr. Tai Wesley was named the WAC player of the week for the seventeenth week of the season with weekly averages of 22.5 PPG, 6.5 RPG, 5.5 AST and 82.6 FG%.
