= Sylvester Seay =

American basketball player (born 1985)

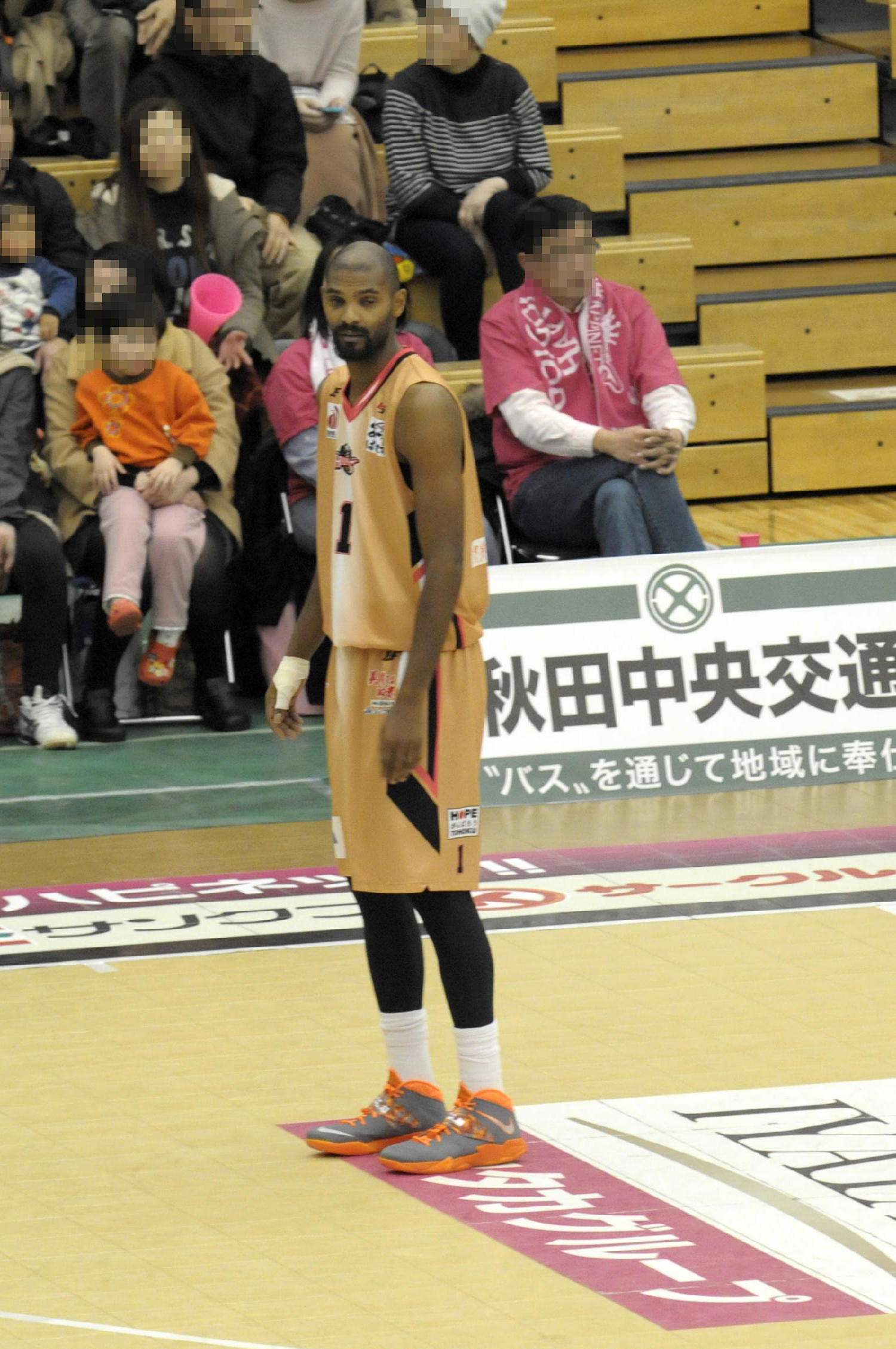

Personal information
- Born: July 29, 1985 (age 40) San Bernardino, California, U.S.
- Listed height: 6 ft 10 in (2.08 m)
- Listed weight: 225 lb (102 kg)

Career information
- High school: Winchendon School (Winchendon, Massachusetts)
- College: Arizona State (2005–2007); Fresno State(2008–2010)
- NBA draft: 2010: undrafted
- Playing career: 2010–2014
- Position: Forward
- Number: 1

Career history
- 2010: Jeonju KCC Egis
- 2011: Waikato Pistons
- 2011: Norrköping Dolphins
- 2012: Tijuana Zonkeys
- 2013: Sigal Prishtina
- 2013–2014: Akita Northern Happinets

Sylvester Seay (born July 29, 1985) is an American former professional basketball player. He last played for the Akita Northern Happinets of the Japanese bj league. He played college basketball for Arizona State and Fresno State.

== College statistics ==
| Year | Team | GP | GS | MPG | FG% | 3P% | FT% | RPG | APG | SPG | BPG | PPG |
|---|---|---|---|---|---|---|---|---|---|---|---|---|
| 2005–06 | Arizona State | 26 | 17 | 11.3 | .431 | .347 | .476 | 1.96 | 0.50 | 0.38 | 0.50 | 4.65 |
| 2006–07 | Arizona State | 12 | 1 | 9.3 | .340 | .167 | .667 | 2.00 | 0.58 | 0.75 | 0.50 | 3.33 |
| 2008–09 | Fresno State | 34 | 30 | 30.0 | .447 | .370 | .692 | 5.76 | 1.15 | 1.03 | 1.71 | 15.32 |
| 2009–10 | Fresno State | 33 | 32 | 29.4 | .452 | .286 | .721 | 6.06 | 1.45 | 1.03 | 1.09 | 14.24 |
| Career | | 105 | 80 | 22.8 | .442 | .320 | .690 | 4.49 | 1.02 | 0.84 | 1.08 | 10.97 |

=== NCAA Awards & Honors ===
- WAC All-Conference Second Team – 2009
- WAC All-Conference Honorable Mention – 2010

== Career statistics ==
Legend
| GP | Games played | GS | Games started | MPG | Minutes per game |
| FG% | Field goal percentage | 3P% | 3-point field goal percentage | FT% | Free throw percentage |
| RPG | Rebounds per game | APG | Assists per game | SPG | Steals per game |
| BPG | Blocks per game | PPG | Points per game | **Bold** | Career high |

| Year | Team | GP | GS | MPG | FG% | 3P% | FT% | RPG | APG | SPG | BPG | PPG |
|---|---|---|---|---|---|---|---|---|---|---|---|---|
| 2010 | ECC | 11 | | 10.0 | .422 | .273 | .630 | 2.8 | 0.6 | 0.5 | 0.2 | 6.6 |
| 2010–11 | Waikato | 4 | | 31.0 | .490 | .300 | .769 | 9.3 | 0.8 | 2.3 | 1.5 | 15.3 |
| 2011–12 | Norrköping/Tijuana | 28 | 18 | 22.2 | .472 | .347 | .776 | 3.75 | 1.14 | 0.64 | 1.32 | 11.79 |
| 2012–13 | Tijuana | 6 | 6 | 25.5 | .328 | .346 | .769 | 4.33 | 0.83 | 0.33 | 0.33 | 9.50 |
| 2013–14 | Akita | 16 | | 15.3 | .328 | .293 | .783 | 4.9 | 0.8 | 0.7 | 0.5 | 6.9 |

== Personal ==
Sylvester was born and raised in San Bernardino, CA. His uncle, Mark Seay, is a former NFL football wide receiver having played for San Diego Chargers, San Francisco 49ers and Philadelphia Eagles. Sylvester currently resides in Nevada.
