= 2009–10 Fresno State Bulldogs men's basketball team =

American college basketball season

2009–10 Fresno State Bulldogs men's basketball
- Conference: Western Athletic Conference
- Record: 15–18 (7–9 WAC)
- Head coach: Steve Cleveland
- Assistant coach: Jeff Reinert
- Home arena: Save Mart Center

2009–10 WAC men's basketball standings
	Conf.				Overall
Team	W		L	PCT	W		L	PCT
Utah State	14	–	2	.875	27	–	7	.794
Nevada	11	–	5	.688	21	–	13	.618
New Mexico State†	11	–	5	.688	22	–	11	.667
Louisiana Tech	9	–	7	.563	24	–	11	.686
Fresno State	7	–	9	.438	15	–	18	.455
San Jose State	6	–	10	.375	14	–	17	.452
Idaho	6	–	10	.375	15	–	16	.484
Boise State	5	–	11	.313	15	–	17	.469
Hawai'i	3	–	13	.188	10	–	20	.333
† 2010 WAC tournament winner Rankings from AP Poll

The 2009–10 Fresno State Bulldogs men's basketball team represented Fresno State University during the 2009–10 college basketball season. This was head coach Steve Cleveland's fifth season at Fresno State. The Bulldogs played their home games at the Save Mart Center and were members of the Western Athletic Conference. Fresno State finished the season 15–18, 7–9 in WAC play and lost in the quarterfinals of the 2010 WAC men's basketball tournament to New Mexico State.

== Pre-season ==
In the WAC preseason polls, released October 20 via media teleconference Fresno State was selected to finish 6th in the coach's poll and 7th in the media poll. Sr. Sylvester Seay was selected to the coache's All-WAC second team.

== 2009–10 Team ==
=== Roster ===
#	Name	Height	Weight (lbs.)	Position	Class	Hometown	Previous Team(s)
1	Mychal Ladd	6'5"	190	G	So.	Seattle, Washington	Rainier Beach HS
2	Jonathan Wills	6'6"	180	G	Jr.	Carson, California	Mayfair HS; New Mexico
3	Taylor Kelly	6'2"	220	G	Fr.	Bakersfield, California	Centennial HS
11	Jerry Brown Jr.	6'7"	195	G F	Fr.	Richmond, California	Sacred Heart
12	Steven Shepp	6'2"	170	G	So.	Woodbridge, Virginia	C.D. Hylton HS; Allegany College of Maryland
15	Nedeljko Golubovic	6'8"	245	F	Jr.	Pljevlja, Serbia	Findlay Prep (Las Vegas)
20	Garrett Johnson	6'5"	190	G F	Fr.	Pomona, California	Diamond Ranch HS
22	Greg Smith	6'10"	250	C	Fr.	Fresno, California	Westwind Academy
24	Paul George	6'8"	210	G F	So.	Palmdale, California	Pete Knight HS
25	Justin Johnson	6'6"	205	F	Fr.	Phoenix, Arizona	Brophy College Prep
30	Sylvester Seay	6'10"	235	F	Sr.	San Bernardino, California	Winchendon School; Arizona State
32	Brandon Sperling	6'4"	180	G	So.	Fresno, California	Buchanan HS
42	Brandon Webster	6'10"	275	C	Jr.	Bryan, Texas	Bryan HS

=== Coaching staff ===
Name	Position	Year at Fresno State	Alma Mater (Year)
Steve Cleveland	Head coach	5th	UC Irvine (1976)
Jeff Reinert	Associate Head Coach	3rd	Gonzaga (1985)
Senque Carey	Assistant coach	5th	New Mexico (2004)
Lee Moon	Assistant coach	3rd	UNC-Wilmington (2002)
Don Slade	Director of Basketball Operations	3rd	Fresno State (1973)
David Siverly	Video Coordinator	1st	Fresno State (2013)

== 2009–10 schedule and results ==
Date time, TV	Rank^{#}	Opponent^{#}	Result	Record	Site (attendance) city, state
Exhibition
Wed, Nov 4; 8:00pm		Chico State	W 78–67	—	Save Mart Center (8,433); Fresno, California
Regular Season
Fri, Nov 13*; 7:00pm		San Francisco State	W 65–59	1–0	Save Mart Center (8,213); Fresno, California
Tue, Nov 17*; 5:35pm, FSN Arizona		at Northern Arizona; West Coast Classic	W 65–59	2–0	Rolle Activity Center (1,123); Flagstaff, Arizona
Thu, Nov 19*; 7:00pm, Bulldog Sports Network		at Seattle	L 84–85	2–1	KeyArena (4,713); Seattle, Washington
Mon, Nov 23*; 7:00pm		San Diego State; West Coast Classic	L 58–62	2–2	Save Mart Center (8,041); Fresno, California
Sat, Nov 28*; 2:00pm		at Santa Clara; West Coast Classic	L 67–74	2–3	Leavey Center (1,332); Santa Clara, California
Tue, Dec 1*; 7:00pm		Pacific; West Coast Classic	L 58–70	2–4	Selland Arena (7,506); Fresno, California
Sun, Dec 6*; 4:00pm		San Diego	W 69–37	3–4	Save Mart Center (7,558); Fresno, California
Tue, Dec 8*; 7:00pm, Bulldog Sports Network		at Pepperdine	W 80–72	4–4	Firestone Fieldhouse (962); Malibu, California
Sat, Dec 12*; 7:00pm, Bulldog Sports Network		BYU	L 67–72	4–5	Save Mart Center; Fresno, California
Thu, Dec 17*; 7:00pm		UC Davis	W 68–57	5–5	Save Mart Center (7,541); Fresno, California
Sat, Dec 19*; 7:00pm		North Dakota State	W 68–54	6–5	Save Mart Center (7,460); Fresno, California
Mon, Dec 21*; 6:00pm		at Montana	L 56–59	6–6	Dahlberg Arena (2,726); Missoula, Montana
Wed, Dec 23*; 5:30pm, FSN Northwest		at Oregon State	L 65–73	6–7	Gill Coliseum (4,167); Corvallis, Oregon
Mon, Dec 28*; 7:00pm		Colorado State	W 73–50	7–7	Save Mart Center (7,425); Fresno, California
Sat, Jan 2; 7:00pm		Boise State	W 71–68	8–7 (1–0)	Save Mart Center (7,983); Fresno, California
Sat, Jan 9; 7:00pm		Hawai'i	W 78–64	9–7 (2–0)	Save Mart Center (8,193); Fresno, California
Mon, Jan 11; 7:00pm		San Jose State	W 80–70	10–7 (3–0)	Save Mart Center (7,991); Fresno, California
Thu, Jan 14; 6:00pm, ESPN Plus		at Louisiana Tech	L 73–81	10–8 (3–1)	Thomas Assembly Center (4,146); Ruston, Louisiana
Sat, Jan 16; 6:00pm, Bulldog Sports Network		at New Mexico State	L 77–86	10–9 (3–2)	Pan American Center (6,106); Las Cruces, New Mexico
Thu, Jan 21; 7:00pm, ESPN Plus		Utah State	L 43–69	10–10 (3–3)	Save Mart Center (8,302); Fresno, California
Sat, Jan 23; 7:00pm		Nevada	W 87–77	11–10 (4–3)	Save Mart Center (8,494); Fresno, California
Thu, Jan 28; 7:00pm		at Idaho	L 59–74	11–11 (4–4)	Cowan Spectrum (1,301); Moscow, Idaho
Sat, Jan 30; 7:15pm		at Boise State	L 49–65	11–12 (4–5)	Taco Bell Arena (5,019); Boise, Idaho
Sat, Feb 6; 10:00pm		at Hawai'i	W 61–51	12–12 (5–5)	Stan Sheriff Center (5,456); Honolulu, Hawaii
Thu, Feb 11; 7:00pm		New Mexico State	W 83–64	13–12 (6–5)	Save Mart Center (7,889); Fresno, California
Sat, Feb 13; 7:00pm		Idaho	L 59–68	13–13 (6–6)	Save Mart Center (8,186); Fresno, California
Wed, Feb 17; 7:00pm, Bulldog Sports Network		at Nevada	L 70–74	13–14 (6–7)	Lawlor Events Center (5,479); Reno, Nevada
Sat, Feb 20*; 7:30pm		UC Santa Barbara; ESPN BracketBusters	L 60–64	13–15	Save Mart Center (7,959); Fresno, California
Tue, Feb 23*; 7:00pm		Cal State Bakersfield	W 79–68	14–15	Save Mart Center (7,607); Fresno, California
Sat, Feb 27; 7:00pm, ESPNU		at San Jose State	L 45–72	14–16 (6–8)	The Event Center (3,047); San Jose, California
Mon, Mar 1; 6:00pm, Bulldog Sports Network		at Utah State	L 39–76	14–17 (6–9)	Smith Spectrum (10,257); Logan, Utah
Thu, Mar 4; 7:00pm		Louisiana Tech	W 66–59	15–17 (7–9)	Save Mart Center (8,350); Fresno, California
WAC tournament
Thu, Mar 11; 2:30pm	(5)	vs. (4) Louisiana Tech; WAC Quarterfinals	L 66–74	15–18	Lawlor Events Center; Reno, Nevada
*Non-conference game. ^{#}Rankings from AP Poll. (#) Tournament seedings in parentheses. All times are in Pacific Time. Source
