= 2009–10 Louisiana Tech Bulldogs basketball team =

American college basketball season

2009–10 Louisiana Tech Bulldogs men's basketball

CIT, Quarterfinals
- Conference: Western Athletic Conference
- Record: 24–11 (9–7 WAC)
- Head coach: Kerry Rupp
- Assistant coaches: Nikita Johnson; Curtis Condie; Dusty May
- Home arena: Thomas Assembly Center

2009–10 WAC men's basketball standings
	Conf.				Overall
Team	W		L	PCT	W		L	PCT
Utah State	14	–	2	.875	27	–	7	.794
Nevada	11	–	5	.688	21	–	13	.618
New Mexico State†	11	–	5	.688	22	–	11	.667
Louisiana Tech	9	–	7	.563	24	–	11	.686
Fresno State	7	–	9	.438	15	–	18	.455
San Jose State	6	–	10	.375	14	–	17	.452
Idaho	6	–	10	.375	15	–	16	.484
Boise State	5	–	11	.313	15	–	17	.469
Hawai'i	3	–	13	.188	10	–	20	.333
† 2010 WAC tournament winner Rankings from AP Poll

The 2009–10 Louisiana Tech Bulldogs basketball team represented Louisiana Tech University in the 2009–10 men's college basketball season. This was Kerry Rupp's 3rd season as head coach. The Bulldogs played their home games at Thomas Assembly Center and compete in the Western Athletic Conference. They finished the season 24–11, 9–7 in WAC play and lost in the semifinals of the 2010 WAC men's basketball tournament. They were invited to the 2010 CollegeInsider.com Tournament where they advanced to the quarterfinals before falling to Missouri State.

== Pre-season ==
In the WAC preseason polls, released October 20 via media teleconference La Tech was selected to finish 5th in the coaches poll and 6th in the media poll. Sr. Kyle Gibson was selected to the coaches All-WAC second team.

== 2009–10 Team ==
=== Roster ===
#	Name	Height	Weight (lbs.)	Position	Class	Hometown	Previous Team(s)
2	Brandon Gibson	6'5"	225	G	So.	Marianna, Florida	Marianna HS
3	Jamel Guyton	6'3"	200	G	Sr.	Odessa, Texas	Odessa HS; Odessa CC
5	Olu Ashaolu	6'7"	220	G	So.	Toronto, Ontario	Humble Christian (Texas)
10	Yonas Berhe	6'0"	170	G	So.	Toronto, Ontario	Father Henry Carr SS
11	DeAndre Brown	5'11"	160	G	Jr.	Fort Worth, Texas	Paul Laurence Dunbar HS; Navarro CC
13	Trey Felder	6'5"	169	G F	Fr.	Jackson, Mississippi	Murrah HS
15	Magnum Rolle	6'11"	225	F C	Sr.	Freeport, Bahamas	Bahamas National prep school LSU
20	Andres Marmolejo	6'3"	215	G	Jr.	Alamo Heights, Texas	Alamo Heights SS; Oakton CC
22	Kyle Gibson	6'5"	205	G	Sr.	Los Angeles, California	Dorsey HS
24	Darius Redding	6'4"	205	F	Fr.	Tallahassee, Florida	Godby HS
30	David Jackson	6'8"	205	F	Sr.	Tucson, Arizona	Rincon HS; Mesa CC
31	Kaiser Stegall	6'3"	205	F	Fr.	Lancaster, Texas	Skyline HS
33	Anson Bartlett	6'3"	175	G	So.	Little Rock, Arkansas	Pulaski Academy
34	Justin Rake	6'3"	200	G	Fr.	Mandeville, Louisiana	St. Paul's School
45	Shawn Oliverson	6'10"	250	F C	Jr.	Preston, Idaho	Preston HS; Cornell

=== Coaching staff ===
Name	Position	Year at La Tech	Alma Mater (Year)
Kerry Rupp	Head coach	3rd	Southern Utah (1977)
Nikita Johnson	Associate head coach	3rd	West Georgia (1989)
Curtis Condie	Assistant coach	3rd	Utah State (1994)
Dusty May	Assistant coach	1st	Indiana (2000)
Cody Fueger	Director of Basketball Operations	3rd	Utah (2006)

== 2009–10 schedule and results ==
- All times are Central

Date time, TV	Rank^{#}	Opponent^{#}	Result	Record	Site (attendance) city, state
Exhibition
Sat, Nov 7; 7:00pm		Lincoln (Mo.)	W 91–54		Thomas Assembly Center (1,013); Ruston, Louisiana
Regular Season
Sat, Nov 14*; 1:00pm		at Texas-Pan American	W 80–62	1–0	UTPA Fieldhouse (458); Edinburg, Texas
Fri, Nov 20*; 7:00pm		vs. Miami (OH); World Vision Classic	W 74–62	2–0	The Pit (NA); Albuquerque, New Mexico
Sat, Nov 21*; 9:30pm, KASY		at New Mexico; World Vision Classic	W 81–52	2–1	The Pit (11,311); Albuquerque, New Mexico
Sun, Nov 22*; 3:00pm		vs. Nicholls State; World Vision Classic	W 77–45	3–1	The Pit (NA); Albuquerque, New Mexico
Wed, Nov 25*; 7:00pm		Arkansas-Little Rock	W 86–66	4–1	Thomas Assembly Center (1,497); Ruston, Louisiana
Sat, Nov 28*; 7:00pm		at TCU	W 68–63	5–1	Daniel-Meyer Coliseum (3,384); Fort Worth, Texas
Wed, Dec 2*; 7:00pm		at Louisiana–Monroe	W 76–73	6–1	Fant–Ewing Coliseum (3,817); Monroe, Louisiana
Sat, Dec 5*; 7:00pm		Northwestern State	W 98–70	7–1	Thomas Assembly Center (2,217); Ruston, Louisiana
Wed, Dec 9*; 8:00pm, FSA/FSSW/KWBA		at Arizona	W 86–67	7–2	McKale Center (13,270); Tucson, Arizona
Sat, Dec 12*; 7:00pm		at Centenary	W 102–96 ^{2OT}	8–2	Gold Dome (2,863); Shreveport, Louisiana
Tue, Dec 15*; 7:00pm		Murray State	W 87-81	9–2	Thomas Assembly Center (1,911); Ruston, Louisiana
Sat, Dec 19*; 7:00pm		McNeese State	W 79–58	10–2	Thomas Assembly Center (1,636); Ruston, Louisiana
Tue, Dec 22*; 8:00pm		Texas-Pan American	W 81–60	11–2	Thomas Assembly Center (2,431); Ruston, Louisiana
Tue, Dec 29*; 7:00pm		at Houston	W 99–94	12–2	Hofheinz Pavilion (2,862); Houston, Texas
Sat, Jan 2; 7:00pm, KAME-TV		Nevada	W 77–71	13–2 (1–0)	Thomas Assembly Center (2,088); Ruston, Louisiana
Mon, Jan 4; 7:00pm		Utah State	W 82–60	14–2 (2–0)	Thomas Assembly Center (2,094); Ruston, Louisiana
Sat, Jan 9; 7:05pm, SWX		at Idaho	W 77–71	15–2 (3–0)	Cowan Spectrum (2,047); Moscow, Idaho
Mon, Jan 11; 8:05pm		at Boise State	W 79–64	16–2 (4–0)	Taco Bell Arena (2,186); Boise, Idaho
Thu, Jan 14; 8:00pm, ALT/BHSN/CST/ESPNFC/KAIL/MASN		Fresno State	W 81–73	17–2 (5–0)	Thomas Assembly Center (4,146); Ruston, Louisiana
Thu, Jan 21; 9:00pm		at San Jose State	L 87–76	17–3 (5–1)	The Event Center Arena (1,516); San Jose, California
Sat, Jan 23; 11:00pm		at Hawai'i	W 65–60	18–3 (6–1)	Stan Sheriff Center (5,857); Honolulu, Hawaii
Sat, Jan 30; 8:00pm		New Mexico State	L 91–77	18–4 (6–2)	Thomas Assembly Center (5,028); Ruston, Louisiana
Thu, Feb 4; 8:00pm, BHSN/CST/ESPNFC/MASN		San Jose State	W 71–64	19–4 (7–2)	Thomas Assembly Center (2,467); Ruston, Louisiana
Mon, Feb 8; 8:00pm, ALT2/CST/ESPNFC		at New Mexico State	L 70–68	19–5 (7–3)	Pan American Center (5,549); Las Cruces, New Mexico
Sat, Feb 13; 8:00pm		Hawai'i	W 66–60	20–5 (8–3)	Thomas Assembly Center (2,096); Ruston, Louisiana
Wed, Feb 17; 10:00pm, ESPN2		at Utah State	L 67–61	20–6 (8–4)	Smith Spectrum (10,049); Logan, Utah
Sat, Feb 20*; 12:00pm, ESPN2		at Northeastern; ESPN BracketBusters	W 70–67	21–6	Matthews Arena (4,414); Boston, Massachusetts
Thu, Feb 25; 7:00pm		Boise State	L 72–59	21–7 (8–5)	Thomas Assembly Center (1,976); Ruston, Louisiana
Sat, Feb 27; 8:00pm		Idaho	W 60–49	22–7 (9–5)	Thomas Assembly Center (2,669); Ruston, Louisiana
Thu, Mar 4; 9:00pm		at Fresno State	L 66–59	22–8 (9–6)	Save Mart Center (8,350); Fresno, California
Sat, Mar 6; 9:00pm		at Nevada	L 79–68	22–9 (9–7)	Lawlor Events Center (7,558); Reno, Nevada
2010 WAC men's basketball tournament
Thu, Mar 11; 4:30pm, ESPNU		vs. Fresno State; Quarterfinals	W 74–66	23–9	Lawlor Events Center (NA); Reno, Nevada
Fri, Mar 12; 8:00pm		vs. Utah State; Semifinals	L 85–55	23–10	Lawlor Events Center (NA); Reno, Nevada
2010 CollegeInsider.com Tournament
Thu, Mar 18; 7:00pm		Southern Miss; First Round	W 66–57	24–10	Thomas Assembly Center (1,873); Ruston, Louisiana
Mon, Mar 22; 7:05pm		at Missouri State; Quarterfinals	L 69–40	24–11	JQH Arena (3,015); Springfield, Missouri
*Non-conference game. ^{#}Rankings from AP Poll. (#) Tournament seedings in parentheses.

== Season highlights ==
On December 7, Sr. Kyle Gibson was named the WAC player of the week for the fourth week of the season with weekly averages of 27.5 PPG, 6.5 RPG, 4.0 AST, 1.5 Steals and 59.3 FG%.

On January 4, So. Olu Ashaolu was named the WAC player of the week for the eighth week of the season with weekly averages of 15.5 PPG, 16.5 RPG, 1.5 AST, 0.5 Steals and 52.4 FG%.

== See also ==
- Louisiana Tech Bulldogs basketball
- 2009–10 WAC men's basketball season
