= 2009–10 Boise State Broncos men's basketball team =

American college basketball season

2009–10 Boise State Broncos men's basketball
- Conference: Western Athletic Conference
- Record: 15–17 (5–11 WAC)
- Head coach: Greg Graham
- Assistant coaches: James Bailey; Andy McClouskey; Tim Cleary
- Home arena: Taco Bell Arena

2009–10 WAC men's basketball standings
	Conf.				Overall
Team	W		L	PCT	W		L	PCT
Utah State	14	–	2	.875	27	–	7	.794
Nevada	11	–	5	.688	21	–	13	.618
New Mexico State†	11	–	5	.688	22	–	11	.667
Louisiana Tech	9	–	7	.563	24	–	11	.686
Fresno State	7	–	9	.438	15	–	18	.455
San Jose State	6	–	10	.375	14	–	17	.452
Idaho	6	–	10	.375	15	–	16	.484
Boise State	5	–	11	.313	15	–	17	.469
Hawai'i	3	–	13	.188	10	–	20	.333
† 2010 WAC tournament winner Rankings from AP Poll

The 2009–10 Boise State Broncos men's basketball team represented Boise State University in the 2009–10 college basketball season. This was head coach Greg Graham's eighth and final season at Boise State as he was fired at the end of the season. The Broncos competed in the Western Athletic Conference and played their home games at the Taco Bell Arena. Boise State finished the season 15–17, 5–11 in WAC play and lost in the quarterfinals of the 2010 WAC men's basketball tournament to Utah State.

== Pre-season ==
In the WAC preseason polls, released October 20 via media teleconference, Boise State was selected to finish 7th in the coaches poll and 5th in the media poll.

== 2009–10 Team ==
=== Roster ===
No.	Name	Ht.	Wt.	Position	Yr.	Hometown	Previous School(s)
1	Perryman, Westly	6' 3"	183	Guard	JR	Boston, Massachusetts	East Boston HS, Monroe College
2	Montreal, Daequon	6' 7"	229	Forward	JR	Syracuse, New York	Corcoran HS, College of Southern Idaho
3	Okoye, Ike	6' 9"	235	Guard	SR	Sacramento, California	Woodcreek HS, Wyoming
4	Salzwedel, Justin	6' 2"	184	Guard	JR	Phoenix, Arizona	Arizona Lutheran Academy, Phoenix College
11	Thomas, Anthony	6' 0"	211	Guard	SR	Mansfield, Texas	Mansfield Summit HS
14	Larsen, Nate	6' 2"	188	Guard	SR	Park City, Utah	Park City HS, Treasure Valley CC
20	Imadiyi, Sean	6' 7"	207	Forward	SR	Chandler, Arizona	Corona Del Sol HS, Arizona Western
21	Arnold, Robert	6' 6"	170	Forward	JR	Lancaster, California	Lancaster HS, Antelope Valley CC
23	Hill, G.A.	5' 8"	140	Guard	FR	Aransas Pass, Texas	Aransas Pass HS
24	Anderson, La'Shard	6' 1"	170	Guard	JR	San Diego, California	Junípero Serra HS, Irvine Valley CC
25	Noonan, Paul	6' 7"	214	Guard	JR	Beaverton, Oregon	Beaverton HS
30	Young, Tyler	6' 8"	219	Forward	FR	Leesburg, Virginia	Bishop O'Connell HS
32	Moritz, Zack	6' 11"	245	Center	JR	Vancouver, Washington	Columbia River HS
42	Hicks, Sam	6' 9"	259	Forward	FR	Redding, California	Liberty Christian HS
50	Cunningham, Kurt	6' 9"	265	Center	SR	Sharpsville, Indiana	Tri-Central HS

(redshirt) Indicates Red Shirt Year

=== Coaching staff ===
Name	Position	Year at Boise State	Alma Mater (Year)
Greg Graham	Head coach	8th	Oregon (1978)
Tim Cleary	Assistant coach	8th	Carroll College (1994)
Andy McClouskey	Assistant coach	8th	Oregon State (1982)
James Bailey	Assistant coach	2nd	Bradley (1992)
Ryan Hellenthal	Director of Basketball Operations	2nd	Illinois-Chicago (2002)

== 2009–10 schedule and results ==
- All times are Mountain

Date time, TV	Rank^{#}	Opponent^{#}	Result	Record	Site (attendance) city, state
Exhibition
Tue, Nov 3; 7:35pm		Willamette	W 111–72		Taco Bell Arena (1,022); Boise, Idaho
Sat, Nov 7; 7:05pm		Concordia	W 109–89		Taco Bell Arena (NA); Boise, Idaho
Regular Season
Fri, Nov 13*; 5:30pm		vs. Loyola Marymount; Montana Tournament	W 90–87	1–0	Dahlberg Arena (NA); Missoula, Montana
Sat, Nov 14*; 7:30pm		at Montana; Montana Tournament	L 82–95	1–1	Dahlberg Arena (3,135); Missoula, Montana
Sun, Nov 15*; 1:00pm		vs. North Dakota; Montana Tournament	W 75–60	2–1	Dahlberg Arena (NA); Missoula, Montana
Sat, Nov 21*; 7:00pm		at Wyoming	L 87–61	2–2	Arena-Auditorium (5,298); Laramie, Wyoming
Tue, Nov 24*; 8:00pm		at Eastern Washington	W 82–69	3–2	Reese Court (1,412); Cheney, Washington
Sat, Nov 28*; 7:05pm		North Texas	W 79–73	4–2	Taco Bell Arena (2,650); Boise, Idaho
Sat, Dec 5*; 5:30pm, BTN		at Illinois	L 84–77	4–3	Assembly Hall (15,903); Champaign, Illinois
Wed, Dec 9*; 7:00pm		at Idaho State	W 79–67	5–3	Holt Arena (2,679); Pocatello, Idaho
Sat, Dec 12*; 7:05pm		San Diego	L 59–56	5–4	Taco Bell Arena (2,359); Boise, Idaho
Sat, Dec 19*; 3:15pm		Houston Baptist	W 96–59	6–4	Taco Bell Arena (2,417); Boise, Idaho
Mon, Dec 21*; 8:15pm		Portland State	W 69–62	7–4	Taco Bell Arena (2,418); Boise, Idaho
Wed, Dec 23*; 7:05pm		Montana State	W 58–56	8–4	Taco Bell Arena (3,008); Boise, Idaho
Tue, Dec 29*; 7:05pm		Northwest Nazarene	W 76–58	9–4	Taco Bell Arena (2,138); Boise, Idaho
Sat, Jan 2; 8:00pm		at Fresno State	L 71–68	9–5 (0–1)	Save Mart Center (7,983); Fresno, California
Mon, Jan 4; 10:05pm, ESPN Plus		at Hawai'i	L 76–68	9–6 (0–2)	Stan Sheriff Center (5,119); Honolulu, Hawaii
Sat, Jan 9; 7:05pm		New Mexico State	L 88–85	9–7 (0–3)	Taco Bell Arena (3,896); Boise, Idaho
Mon, Jan 11; 7:05pm		Louisiana Tech	L 79–64	9–8 (0–4)	Taco Bell Arena (2,186); Boise, Idaho
Thu, Jan 14; 8:00pm		at San Jose State	L 76–74	9–9 (0–5)	The Event Center Arena (1,382); San Jose, California
Sat, Jan 16; 7:05pm		at Utah State	L 81–59	9–10 (0–6)	Smith Spectrum (9,769); Logan, Utah
Wed, Jan 20; 8:15pm		Nevada	L 88–82	9–11 (0–7)	Taco Bell Arena (2,833); Boise, Idaho
Mon, Jan 25; 9:05pm, ESPNU		at Idaho	W 77–67 ^{OT}	10–11 (1–7)	Cowan Spectrum (4,104); Moscow, Idaho
Sat, Jan 30; 8:15pm, ESPN Plus		Fresno State	W 65–49	11–11 (2–7)	Taco Bell Arena (5,019); Boise, Idaho
Sat, Feb 6; 7:05pm		Idaho	L 79–55	11–12 (2–8)	Taco Bell Arena (7,734); Boise, Idaho
Thu, Feb 11; 7:05pm		Utah State	L 72–67	11–13 (2–9)	Taco Bell Arena (3,064); Boise, Idaho
Sat, Feb 13; 8:05pm		at Nevada	L 88–80 ^{OT}	11–14 (2–10)	Lawlor Events Center (7,598); Reno, Nevada
Wed, Feb 17*; 8:15pm		Cal-State Bakersfield	W 81–62	12–14	Taco Bell Arena (2,027); Boise, Idaho
Sat, Feb 20*; 7:05pm		UC Davis	L 82–74	12–15	Taco Bell Arena (1,906); Boise, Idaho
Thu, Feb 25; 6:05pm		at Louisiana Tech	W 72–59	13–15 (3–10)	Thomas Assembly Center (1,976); Ruston, Louisiana
Sat, Feb 27; 7:05pm, ESPN Plus		at New Mexico State	L 95–92	13–16 (3–11)	Pan American Center (6,691); Las Cruces, New Mexico
Thu, Mar 4; 7:05pm		Hawai'i	W 82–63	14–16 (4–11)	Taco Bell Arena (2,183); Boise, Idaho
Sat, Mar 6; 4:15pm		San Jose State	W 85–56	15–16 (5–11)	Taco Bell Arena (3,142); Boise, Idaho
2010 WAC men's basketball tournament
Thur, Mar 11; 1:00pm, ESPNU		vs. Utah State; Quarterfinals	L 84–60	15–17	Lawlor Events Center (NA); Reno, Nevada
*Non-conference game. ^{#}Rankings from AP Poll. (#) Tournament seedings in parentheses.

== Season highlights ==
On November 30, Sr. Ike Okoye was named the WAC player of the week for the third week of the season with weekly averages of 17.0 PPG, 12.5 RPG, 2.5 AST, 4.5 Blocks and 54.2 FG%.

On March 1, Jr. Robert Arnold was named the WAC player of the week for the sixteenth week of the season with weekly averages of 22.0 PPG, 9.0 RPG, 3.0 AST, and 75.0 FG%.
