= 2009–10 Idaho Vandals men's basketball team =

American college basketball season

2009–10 Idaho Vandals men's basketball
- Conference: Western Athletic Conference
- Record: 15–16 (6–10 WAC)
- Head coach: Don Verlin (2nd season)
- Assistant coaches: Ray Lopes; Mike Freeman; Mike Score
- Home arena: Cowan Spectrum

2009–10 WAC men's basketball standings
	Conf.				Overall
Team	W		L	PCT	W		L	PCT
Utah State	14	–	2	.875	27	–	7	.794
Nevada	11	–	5	.688	21	–	13	.618
New Mexico State†	11	–	5	.688	22	–	11	.667
Louisiana Tech	9	–	7	.563	24	–	11	.686
Fresno State	7	–	9	.438	15	–	18	.455
San Jose State	6	–	10	.375	14	–	17	.452
Idaho	6	–	10	.375	15	–	16	.484
Boise State	5	–	11	.313	15	–	17	.469
Hawai'i	3	–	13	.188	10	–	20	.333
† 2010 WAC tournament winner Rankings from AP Poll

The 2009–10 Idaho Vandals men's basketball team represented the University of Idaho during the 2009–10 NCAA Division I men's basketball season. Members of the Western Athletic Conference (WAC), the Vandals were led by second-year head coach Don Verlin and played their home games on campus at Cowan Spectrum in Moscow, Idaho.

The Vandals were 15–15 overall in the regular season and 6–10 in conference play, tied for sixth in the standings. They met second-seed and host Nevada in the quarterfinals of the conference tournament in Reno and lost by sixteen points.

== Pre-season ==
In the WAC preseason polls, released October 20 via media teleconference, Idaho was selected to finish fourth in both the media and coaches poll and senior guard Mac Hobson was selected to the All-WAC first team by both the media and coaches.

== Roster ==
No.	Name	Ht.	Wt.	Position	Yr.	Hometown	Previous School(s)
0	Stern, Corey	6'–7"	200	Forward	FR	Seattle, Washington	Rainier Beach HS
1	Hopson, Mac	6'–2"	185	Guard	SR	Portland, Oregon	Jefferson HS, Washington State
2	Ledbetter, Jeff	6'–3"	195	Guard	JR	Brea, California	Orange Lutheran HS, Irvine Valley CC
3	Henderson, Shawn	6'–3"	178	Guard	JR	Renton, Washington	Renton HS, North Idaho College
5	Johnson, Steffan	6'–1"	180	Guard	SR	Kent, Washington	Kent-Meridian HS, Pacific
10	Tatum, Landon	5'–11"	196	Guard	JR	San Antonio, Texas	O'Connor HS, South Plains CC
11	Wiley, Brandon	6'–6"	218	Forward	SR	Pinole, California	Pinole Valley HS, City College of San Francisco
13	de Souza, Luciano	6'–7"	210	Forward	SR	Matão, Brazil	South Plains CC
20	Lawrence, Marcus	5'–11"	174	Guard	JR	Las Vegas, Nevada	Bishop Gorman HS, UNLV
21	Toledo, Luiz	6'–8"	225	Forward	SO	Araraquara, Brazil	Modesto Christian HS, St. Francis Xavier
23	Stewart, Justin	6'–1"	185	Guard	FR	Spokane, Washington	Ferris HS
32	Watson, Kashif	6'–4"	186	Guard	SR	Las Vegas, Nevada	Bishop Gorman HS, Irvine Valley CC
33	Barone, Kyle	6'–10"	220	Center	FR	Garden Grove, California	Pacifica HS
34	Blackstock, Travis	6'–5"	206	Forward	SR	Kuna, Idaho	Kuna HS
42	Kammerer, Joe	6'–9"	241	Center	FR	Eugene, Oregon	North Eugene HS
53	Jefferson, Marvin	6'–9"	250	Center	SR	Merced, California	Golden Valley HS, Modesto JC

== Coaching staff ==
Name	Position	Year at Idaho	Alma mater (Year)
Don Verlin	Head Coach	2nd	Stanislaus State (1991)
Ray Lopes	Associate Head Coach	2nd	College of Idaho (1987)
Mike Freeman	Assistant Coach	3rd	Iowa (2006)
Mike Score	Assistant Coach	3rd	Washington (1996)
Chris Helbling	Director of Basketball Operations	2nd	Gonzaga (2008)

== Schedule and results ==
Date time, TV	Opponent	Result	Record	Site (attendance) city, state
Exhibition
Fri, Nov 6; 8:05 pm	St. Martin's	W 87–61		Memorial Gym (1,472); Moscow, Idaho
Regular Season
Fri, Nov 13*; 6:00 pm	at Utah	W 94–87	1–0	Jon M. Huntsman Center (8,127); Salt Lake City, Utah
Sun, Nov 15*; 4:00 pm	at Texas Southern	W 72–65	1–1	Health and Physical Education Arena (659); Houston, Texas
Sat, Nov 21*; 2:00 pm	at North Dakota State	W 81–69	2–1	Bison Sports Arena (3,247); Fargo, North Dakota
Tue, Nov 24*; 7:05 pm	Sacramento State	W 75–61	3–1	Memorial Gym (740); Moscow, Idaho
Sat, Nov 28*; 7:05 pm	Eastern Washington	W 76–54	4–1	Memorial Gym (1,500); Moscow, Idaho
Thu, Dec 3*; 7:05 pm	at Cal-State Northridge	L 93–95	4–2	Matadome (1,175); Northridge, California
Sun, Dec 6*; 5:05 pm, SWX	No. 25 Portland	W 68–48	5–2	Cowan Spectrum (1,500); Moscow, Idaho
Wed, Dec 9*; 8:00 pm, FSN	at Washington State	L 64–76	5–3	Beasley Coliseum (7,285); Pullman, Washington
Sat, Dec 12*; 5:05 pm	Eastern Oregon	W 82–77	6–3	Memorial Gym (1,023); Moscow, Idaho
Tue, Dec 22*; 7:00 pm	Portland	L 52–82	6–4	Chiles Center (1,746); Portland, Oregon
Tue, Dec 29; 7:05 pm	vs. Lewis-Clark State	W 71–52	7–4	Qwest Arena (4,111); Boise, Idaho
Sat, Jan 2; 9:05 pm	at Hawai'i	W 59–52	8–4 (1–0)	Stan Sheriff Center (5,611); Honolulu, Hawaii
Mon, Jan 4; 7:05 pm	at San Jose State	L 75–78	8–5 (1–1)	The Event Center Arena (1,287); San Jose, California
Sat, Jan 9; 5:05 pm	Louisiana Tech	L 71–77	8–6 (1–2)	Cowan Spectrum (2,047); Moscow, Idaho
Mon, Jan 11; 7:05 pm	New Mexico State	L 72–75	8–7 (1–3)	Cowan Spectrum (1,296); Moscow, Idaho
Sat, Jan 16; 7:05 pm	at Nevada	L 68–76	8–8 (1–4)	Lawlor Events Center (6,030); Reno, Nevada
Sat, Jan 23; 5:05 pm	Utah State	L 48–60	8–9 (1–5)	Cowan Spectrum (2,570); Moscow, Idaho
Mon, Jan 25; 8:00 pm, ESPNU	Boise State	L 67–77 ^{OT}	8–10 (1–6)	Cowan Spectrum (4,104); Moscow, Idaho
Thu, Jan 28; 7:05 pm, SWX	Fresno State	W 74–59	9–10 (2–6)	Cowan Spectrum (1,301); Moscow, Idaho
Sat, Jan 30*; 7:10 pm	at Seattle	W 87–85	10–10	KeyArena (4,183); Seattle, Washington
Wed, Feb 3; 8:00 pm, ESPN2	at Utah State	L 62–80	10–11 (2–7)	Smith Spectrum (9,777); Logan, Utah
Sat, Feb 6; 6:05 pm	at Boise State	W 79–55	11–11 (3–7)	Taco Bell Arena (7,734); Boise, Idaho
Wed, Feb 10; 8:00 pm, ESPN2	Nevada	L 66–67	11–12 (3–8)	Cowan Spectrum (1,580); Moscow, Idaho
Sat, Feb 13; 7:00 pm	at Fresno State	W 68–59	12–12 (4–8)	Save Mart Center (8,186); Fresno, California
Thu, Feb 18*; 7:05 pm	Seattle	W 82–72	13–12	Cowan Spectrum (1,287); Moscow, Idaho
Sat, Feb 20*; 5:30 pm	Long Beach State; ESPNU BracketBusters	L 66–77	13–13	Cowan Spectrum (1,554); Moscow, Idaho
Wed, Feb 24; 8:00 pm, ESPN2	at New Mexico State	L 57–74	13–14 (4–9)	Pan American Center (5,834); Las Cruces, New Mexico
Sat, Feb 27; 5:00 pm	at Louisiana Tech	L 49–60	13–15 (4–10)	Thomas Assembly Center (2,669); Ruston, Louisiana
Thu, Mar 4; 7:00 pm, ESPN Regional	San Jose State	W 86–76	14–15 (5–10)	Cowan Spectrum (961); Moscow, Idaho
Sat, Mar 6; 5:05 pm, SWX	Hawai'i	W 78–69	15–15 (6–10)	Cowan Spectrum (1,502); Moscow, Idaho
WAC Tournament
Thu, Mar 11; 6:00 pm	at (2) Nevada; Quarterfinals	L 71–87	15–16	Lawlor Events Center; Reno, Nevada
*Non-conference game. ^{#}Rankings from AP poll. (#) Tournament seedings in parentheses. All times are in Pacific time.
