= 2009–10 Nevada Wolf Pack men's basketball team =

American college basketball season

2009–10 Nevada Wolf Pack men's basketball

NIT, Second Round
- Conference: Western Athletic Conference
- Record: 21–13 (11–5 WAC)
- Head coach: David Carter (1st season)
- Assistant coaches: Doug Novsek; Keith Brown; Dennis Gates
- Home arena: Lawlor Events Center

2009–10 WAC men's basketball standings
	Conf.				Overall
Team	W		L	PCT	W		L	PCT
Utah State	14	–	2	.875	27	–	7	.794
Nevada	11	–	5	.688	21	–	13	.618
New Mexico State†	11	–	5	.688	22	–	11	.667
Louisiana Tech	9	–	7	.563	24	–	11	.686
Fresno State	7	–	9	.438	15	–	18	.455
San Jose State	6	–	10	.375	14	–	17	.452
Idaho	6	–	10	.375	15	–	16	.484
Boise State	5	–	11	.313	15	–	17	.469
Hawai'i	3	–	13	.188	10	–	20	.333
† 2010 WAC tournament winner Rankings from AP Poll

The 2009–10 Nevada Wolf Pack men's basketball team represented the University of Nevada in the 2009–10 college basketball season. This was head coach David Carter's first season as head coach after being a Wolf Pack assistant coach for the previous ten years. They are members of the Western Athletic Conference and play their home games at the Lawlor Events Center. The Wolf Pack finished the season 21–13, 11–5 in WAC play and lost in the semifinals of the 2010 WAC men's basketball tournament. They were invited to the 2010 National Invitation Tournament where they advanced to the second round before falling to Rhode Island.

== Pre-season ==
In the WAC preseason polls, released October 20 via media teleconference Nevada was selected to finish 2nd in the coaches poll and received one first place vote. So. Luke Babbitt and Jr. Armon Johnson were selected to the coach's All-WAC first team and Babbitt was selected as pre-season WAC player of the year.

The media poll almost mirrored the coaches poll as the Wolf Pack were selected to finish 2nd and received 12 first place votes, Babbitt and Johnson were selected to the All-WAC first team and Babbitt was selected as the media WAC pre-season player of the year.

== 2009–10 team ==
=== Roster ===
#	Name	Height	Weight (lbs.)	Position	Class	Hometown	Previous Team(s)
0	Brandon Fields	6'4"	190	G	Sr.	Arlington, Texas	Bowie HS
1	Patrick Nyeko	6'6"	180	G	Fr.	London, UK	Seattle Prep
3	Joey Shaw	6'6"	210	F	Sr.	Glendale, Arizona	Deer Valley High School HS; College of Southern Idaho
5	Luke Babbitt	6'9"	225	F	So.	Reno, Nevada	Galena HS
11	London Giles	6'3"	185	G	So.	Dallas, Texas	Kimball HS
12	Keith Fuetsch	5'11"	170	G	Fr.	Reno, Nevada	Bishop Manogue HS
14	Marko Cukic	6'9"	240	F	Fr.	Belgrade, Serbia	IMG Academy
20	Ray Kraemer	6'4"	220	G	Sr.	Kemah, Texas	Clear Creek HS; Weatherford CC
21	Malik Story	6'5"	225	G	So.	Pasadena, California	Artesia HS; Indiana
23	Armon Johnson	6'3"	195	G	Jr.	Reno, Nevada	Hug HS
33	Adam Carp	6'7"	205	F	Jr.	Clayton, California	Clayton Valley HS
43	Keith Olson	6'9"	260	F	So.	Gardnerville, Nevada	Douglas HS; Northern Arizona
54	Dario Hunt	6'8"	230	F	So.	Colorado Springs, Colorado	Charis Prep

=== Coaching staff ===
Name	Position	Year at Nevada	Alma Mater (Year)
David Carter	Head coach	1st	Saint Mary's (1989)
Doug Novsek	Associate Head Coach	4th	Southern Illinois (1987)
Keith Brown	Assistant coach	1st	Hampton (1993)
Dennis Gates	Assistant coach	1st	California (2001)
Zac Claus	Director of Basketball Operations	5th	Eastern Washington (1998)

== 2009–10 schedule and results ==
- All times are Pacific

Date time, TV	Rank^{#}	Opponent^{#}	Result	Record	Site (attendance) city, state
Exhibition
Tue, Nov 10; 7:05pm		Chico State	W 90–63		Lawlor Events Center (3,687); Reno, Nevada
Regular Season
Sat, Nov 14*; 7:05pm		Montana State	W 75–61	1–0	Lawlor Events Center (7,371); Reno, Nevada
Wed, Nov 18*; 7:30pm		at UNLV	L 75–88	1–1	Thomas & Mack Center (13,113); Paradise, Nevada
Sat, Nov 21*; 8:05pm		Houston	W 112–99	2–1	Lawlor Events Center (5,721); Reno, Nevada
Fri, Nov 27*; 4:30pm		at VCU	L 76–85	2–2	Stuart C. Siegel Center (5,769); Richmond, Virginia
Sun, Nov 29*; 4:45pm, FSN		at No. 11 North Carolina	L 73–80	2–3	Dean Smith Center (17,321); Chapel Hill, North Carolina
Sat, Dec 5*; 7:00pm		at Pacific	L 58–61	2–4	Alex G. Spanos Center (2,801); Stockton, California
Tue, Dec 8*; 7:05pm		Fresno Pacific	W 89–67	3–4	Lawlor Events Center (3,778); Reno, Nevada
Sat, Dec 12*; 7:05pm		South Dakota State	W 92–72	4–4	Lawlor Events Center (3,130); Reno, Nevada
Thu, Dec 17*; 7:05pm		Eastern Washington	W 73–70	5–4	Lawlor Events Center (4,713); Reno, Nevada
Sat, Dec 19*; 7:05pm		Wagner	W 74–61	6–4	Lawlor Events Center (4,692); Reno, Nevada
Tue, Dec 22*; 7:30pm		vs. BYU; Las Vegas Classic	L 104–110	6–5	Orleans Arena (NA); Paradise, Nevada
Wed, Dec 23*; 5:00pm		vs. Tulsa; Las Vegas Classic	W 99–68	7–5	Orleans Arena (NA); Paradise, Nevada
Mon, Dec 28*; 7:05pm		Portland	W 78–69	8–5	Lawlor Events Center (5,827); Reno, Nevada
Sat, Jan 2; 5:00pm		at Louisiana Tech	L 71–77	8–6 (0–1)	Thomas Assembly Center (2,088); Ruston, Louisiana
Mon, Jan 4; 8:00pm, ESPNU		at New Mexico State	W 77–67	9–6 (1–1)	Pan American Center (4,788); Las Cruces, New Mexico
Sat, Jan 9; 7:05pm		San Jose State	W 96–67	10–6 (2–1)	Lawlor Events Center (5,988); Reno, Nevada
Wed, Jan 13; 8:00pm, ESPN2		Utah State	L 72–79 ^{OT}	10–7 (2–2)	Lawlor Events Center (7,035); Reno, Nevada
Sat, Jan 16; 7:05pm		Idaho	W 76–68	11–7 (3–2)	Lawlor Events Center (6,030); Reno, Nevada
Wed, Jan 20; 7:15pm		at Boise State	W 88–62	12–7 (4–2)	Taco Bell Arena (2,833); Boise, Idaho
Sat, Jan 23; 7:00pm		at Fresno State	L 77–87	12–8 (4–3)	Save Mart Center (8,494); Fresno, California
Sat, Jan 30; 7:05pm		Hawai'i	W 66–60	13–8 (5–3)	Lawlor Events Center (7,490); Reno, Nevada
Sat, Feb 6; 7:00pm, ESPNU		at Utah State	L 65–76	13–9 (5–4)	Smith Spectrum (10,270); Logan, Utah
Wed, Feb 10; 8:00pm, ESPN2		at Idaho	W 67–66	14–9 (6–4)	Cowan Spectrum (1,580); Moscow, Idaho
Sat, Feb 13; 7:05pm		Boise State	W 88–80 ^{OT}	15–9 (7–4)	Lawlor Events Center (7,598); Reno, Nevada
Wed, Feb 17; 7:05pm		Fresno State	W 74–70	16–9 (8–4)	Lawlor Events Center (5,479); Reno, Nevada
Sat, Feb 20*; 12:00pm, ESPN2		at Missouri State; ESPN BracketBusters	L 60–62	16–10	JQH Arena (7,805); Springfield, Missouri
Thu, Feb 25; 7:00pm		at San Jose State	W 83–79	17–10 (9–4)	The Event Center (2,385); San Jose, California
Sat, Feb 27; 9:00pm		at Hawai'i	L 74–63	17–11 (9–5)	Stan Sheriff Center (6,025); Honolulu, Hawaii
Thu, Mar 4; 7:05pm		New Mexico State	W 100–92	18–11 (10–5)	Lawlor Events Center (5,878); Reno, Nevada
Sat, Mar 6; 7:05pm		Louisiana Tech	W 79–68	19–11 (11–5)	Lawlor Events Center (7,558); Reno, Nevada
2010 WAC men's basketball tournament
Thu, Mar 11; 6:00pm		Idaho; Quarterfinals	W 87–71	20–11	Lawlor Events Center (NA); Reno, Nevada
Fri, Mar 12; 9:00pm, ESPN2		New Mexico State; Semifinals	L 79–80	20–12	Lawlor Events Center (5,897); Reno, Nevada
2010 National Invitation Tournament
Wed, Mar 17; 5:05pm		at Wichita State; First Round	W 74–70	21–12	Charles Koch Arena (9,112); Wichita, Kansas
Mon, Mar 22; 3:00pm, ESPNU		at Rhode Island; Second Round	L 83–85	21–13	Ryan Center (3,419); Kingston, Rhode Island
*Non-conference game. ^{#}Rankings from AP Poll. (#) Tournament seedings in parentheses.

== Season highlights ==
On November 23, Sr. Joey Shaw was named the WAC player of the week for the second week of the season with weekly averages of 20.5 PPG, 9.0 RPG, 2.5 AST and 61.9 FG%.

On January 11, So. Luke Babbitt was named the WAC player of the week for the ninth week of the season with weekly averages of 23.0 PPG, 10.5 RPG, 3.0 AST and 58.3 FG%.

On February 15, Jr. Armon Johnson was named the WAC player of the week for the fourteenth week of the season with weekly averages of 23.5 PPG, 1.5 RPG, 5.5 AST and 50.0 FG%.
