= 2009–10 San Jose State Spartans men's basketball team =

American college basketball season

2009–10 San Jose State Spartans men's basketball
- Conference: Western Athletic Conference
- Record: 14–17 (6–10 WAC)
- Head coach: George Nessman
- Assistant coaches: Brent Davis; Gary Stepan; Donald Williams
- Home arena: The Event Center

2009–10 WAC men's basketball standings
	Conf.				Overall
Team	W		L	PCT	W		L	PCT
Utah State	14	–	2	.875	27	–	7	.794
Nevada	11	–	5	.688	21	–	13	.618
New Mexico State†	11	–	5	.688	22	–	11	.667
Louisiana Tech	9	–	7	.563	24	–	11	.686
Fresno State	7	–	9	.438	15	–	18	.455
San Jose State	6	–	10	.375	14	–	17	.452
Idaho	6	–	10	.375	15	–	16	.484
Boise State	5	–	11	.313	15	–	17	.469
Hawai'i	3	–	13	.188	10	–	20	.333
† 2010 WAC tournament winner Rankings from AP Poll

The 2009–10 San Jose State Spartans men's basketball team represented San Jose State University during the 2009–10 NCAA Division I men's basketball season. This was George Nessman's fifth season as head coach. The Spartans played their home games at The Event Center and competed in the Western Athletic Conference (WAC). San Jose State finished the season 14–17, and 6–10 in WAC play and lost in the quarterfinals of the 2010 WAC men's basketball tournament to New Mexico State.

== Preseason roster changes ==
=== Recruits ===
College recruiting information
Name	Hometown	School	Height	Weight	Commit date
Anthony Dixon; SG	Chicago, Illinois	Hyde Park Academy HS	6 ft 5 in (1.96 m)	195 lb (88 kg)	Nov 11, 2008
Anthony Dixon; SG	Recruit ratings: No ratings found				
Joe Henson; C	Pasadena, California	Pasadena HS	6 ft 7 in (2.01 m)	220 lb (100 kg)	Oct 20, 2008
Joe Henson; C	Recruit ratings: Scout:				
Aalim Moor; PG	Oakland, California	Saint Mary's College HS	6 ft 1 in (1.85 m)	165 lb (75 kg)	Feb 15, 2008
Aalim Moor; PG	Recruit ratings: Scout: Rivals:				
Overall recruit ranking:
Note: In many cases, Scout, Rivals, 247Sports, On3, and ESPN may conflict in their listings of height and weight.; In these cases, the average was taken. ESPN grades are on a 100-point scale.; Sources: "2009 San Jose St. Basketball Commitment List". Rivals.; "2009 San Jose State Basketball Recruiting". Scout.; "San José St Spartans 2009 Player Commits". ESPN.; "Scout.com Team Recruiting Rankings". Scout.; "2009 Team Ranking". Rivals.

== Preseason ==
In the WAC preseason polls, released October 20 via media teleconference San Jose State was selected to finish 8th in the coaches and media poll.

== Roster ==
2009–10 San Jose State Spartans men's basketball team
Players
Coaches

Pos.	#	Name	Height	Weight	Year	Previous school	Hometown
G	2	Adrian Oliver	6 ft 4 in (1.93 m)	210 lb (95 kg)	RS Jr	U. of Washington	Modesto, California
F	4	Kyle Thomas	6 ft 8 in (2.03 m)	225 lb (102 kg)	RS So	Loyola U. Chicago	Folsom, California
G	5	Justin Graham	6 ft 4 in (1.93 m)	195 lb (88 kg)	RS Jr	Ripon HS	Ripon, California
G	10	Aalim Moor	6 ft 3 in (1.91 m)	183 lb (83 kg)	Fr	Saint Mary's College HS	Oakland, California
F	21	Moses Omolade	6 ft 8 in (2.03 m)	200 lb (91 kg)	Jr	Southwestern CC	Brooklyn, New York
F	22	C. J. Webster	6 ft 9 in (2.06 m)	255 lb (116 kg)	RS Jr	Texas State U.	Missouri City, Texas
G	23	Robert Owens	6 ft 3 in (1.91 m)	195 lb (88 kg)	Sr	CC of San Francisco	Oakland, California
G	24	Chris Jones	6 ft 4 in (1.93 m)	205 lb (93 kg)	Fr	Westwind Prep	Hayward, California
C	30	Chris Oakes	6 ft 10 in (2.08 m)	235 lb (107 kg)	RS Sr	Pepperdine U.	Oakland, California
C	32	Joe Henson	6 ft 8 in (2.03 m)	245 lb (111 kg)	Fr	Pasadena HS	Pasadena, California
G	33	Mac Peterson	6 ft 3 in (1.91 m)	195 lb (88 kg)	Sr	Diablo Valley CC	Antioch, California
G	35	Anthony Dixon	6 ft 5 in (1.96 m)	195 lb (88 kg)	Fr	Hyde Park Academy HS	Chicago, Illinois
F	44	Jerry Casey (W)	6 ft 8 in (2.03 m)	195 lb (88 kg)	Fr	Mission College Prep	San Luis Obispo, California
F	50	Garrett Ton	6 ft 8 in (2.03 m)	222 lb (101 kg)	So	Torrance West HS	Torrance, California
G	52	Jerrelle Wilson	6 ft 1 in (1.85 m)	200 lb (91 kg)	Sr	Sacred Heart Cathedral Prep	San Francisco, California

Head coach

George Nessman (California)

Assistant coach(es)

Brent Davis (San Diego State)
Gary Stepan (California Lutheran)
Donald Williams (Cal State Hayward)

Legend

- (C) Team captain
- (S) Suspended
- (I) Ineligible
- (W) Walk-on
- Injured
- Current redshirt

Roster

== 2009–10 schedule and results ==
- All times are Pacific

Date time, TV	Rank^{#}	Opponent^{#}	Result	Record	Site (attendance) city, state
Mon, Nov 16*; 7:00pm		William Jessup	W 89–63	1–0	The Event Center (1,339); San Jose, California
Fri, Nov 20*; 8:00pm, FSNW		at No. 14 Washington	W 80–70	1–1	Bank of America Arena (8,155); Seattle, Washington
Sun, Nov 22*; 2:00pm		at UC Riverside	W 70–66	1–2	UC Riverside Student Recreation Center (444); Riverside, California
Sat, Nov 28*; 1:00pm		Pacific	W 59–55	2–2	The Event Center (1,123); San Jose, California
Mon, Nov 30*; 7:00pm		Saint Mary's	W 78–71	2–3	The Event Center (2,166); San Jose, California
Sat, Dec 5*; 2:05pm		at Utah Valley	W 82–74	3–3	McKay Events Center (1,124); Orem, Utah
Tue, Dec 8*; 7:00pm		at San Francisco	W 76–71	3–4	War Memorial Gymnasium (1,643); San Francisco, California
Wed, Dec 9*; 7:00pm		Cal State Bakersfield	W 84–80 ^{OT}	4–4	The Event Center (1,158); San Jose, California
Fri, Dec 18*; 7:00pm		at UC Irvine	W 69–56	5–4	Bren Events Center (1,107); Irvine, California
Mon, Dec 21*; 6:35pm		at Northern Colorado	W 93–69	5–5	Butler-Hancock Sports Pavilion (2,698); Greeley, Colorado
Wed, Dec 23*; 7:00pm		at Santa Clara	W 74–68	6–5	Leavey Center (1,634); Santa Clara, California
Mon, Dec 28*; 7:00pm		UC Irvine	W 78–68	7–5	The Event Center (1,358); San Jose, California
Mon, Jan 4; 7:00pm		Idaho	W 78–75	8–5 (1–0)	The Event Center (1,287); San Jose, California
Sat, Jan 9; 7:05pm		at Nevada	W 96–67	8–6 (1–1)	Lawlor Events Center (5,988); Reno, Nevada
Mon, Jan 11; 7:00pm		at Fresno State	W 80–70	8–7 (1–2)	Save Mart Center (7,991); Fresno, California
Thu, Jan 14; 7:00pm		Boise State	W 76–74	9–7 (2–2)	The Event Center (1,382); San Jose, California
Sun, Jan 17; 9:05pm		at Hawai'i	L 68–67	9–8 (2–3)	Stan Sheriff Center (5,723); Honolulu, Hawaii
Thu, Jan 21; 7:00pm		Louisiana Tech	W 87–76	10–8 (3–3)	The Event Center (1,516); San Jose, California
Sat, Jan 23; 7:30pm		New Mexico State	W 93–84	11–8 (4–3)	The Event Center (2,285); San Jose, California
Thu, Jan 28; 7:00pm		Hawai'i	W 83–60	12–8 (5–3)	The Event Center (2,651); San Jose, California
Sat, Jan 30; 7:00pm		at Utah State	L 77–58	12–9 (5–4)	Smith Spectrum (10,270); Logan, Utah
Thu, Feb 4; 8:00pm, ESPN Plus		at Louisiana Tech	W 71–64	12–10 (5–5)	Thomas Assembly Center (2,467); Ruston, Louisiana
Sat, Feb 6; 7:00pm		at New Mexico State	L 94–82	12–11 (5–6)	Pan American Center (6,255); Las Cruces, New Mexico
Sat, Feb 13; 7:00pm		Utah State	L 81–65	12–12 (5–7)	The Event Center (2,128); San Jose, California
Sat, Feb 20*; 7:00pm		at Montana State	W 77–66	13–12	Worthington Arena (3,468); Bozeman, Montana
Mon, Feb 22*; 7:00pm		Seattle	L 90–88	13–13	The Event Center (2,124); San Jose, California
Thu, Feb 25; 7:00pm, CSN		Nevada	L 83–79	13–14 (5–8)	The Event Center (2,385); San Jose, California
Sat, Feb 27; 7:00pm, ESPNU		Fresno State	W 72–45	14–14 (6–8)	The Event Center (3,047); San Jose, California
Thu, Mar 4; 7:00pm, ESPN Plus		at Idaho	L 86–76	14–15 (6–9)	Cowan Spectrum (961); Moscow, Idaho
Sat, Mar 6; 4:15pm		at Boise State	L 85–56	14–16 (6–10)	Taco Bell Arena (3,142); Boise, Idaho
2010 WAC men's basketball tournament
Thu, Mar 11; 8:30pm		vs. New Mexico State; Quarterfinals	L 90–69	14–17	Lawlor Events Center (NA); Reno, Nevada
*Non-conference game. ^{#}Rankings from AP Poll. (#) Tournament seedings in parentheses.

== Season highlights ==
On December 21, Jr. Adrian Oliver was named the WAC player of the week for the sixth week of the season with weekly averages of 31.0 PPG, 8.0 RPG, 2.0 AST, 2.0 Steals, 1.0 Block and 52.6 FG%.

On January 25, Oliver again was named the WAC player of the week for the eleventh week of the season with weekly averages of 30.5 PPG, 5. AST, 3.0 RPG, 2.0 Steals and 54.3 FG%. Oliver was the first player in the WAC to be awarded the WAC Player of the Week twice during the 2009–10 season. On January 26 Oliver was also named the Oscar Robertson National Player of the Week by the U.S. Basketball Writers Association for games ending the week of January 24.
