= 2010 WAC men's basketball tournament =

- Tournament Logo
- Classification: Division I
- Season: 2009–10
- Teams: 8
- Site: Lawlor Events Center; Reno, Nevada
- Champions: New Mexico State (2nd title)
- Winning coach: Marvin Menzies (1st title)
- Television: ESPNU/ESPN2

2009–10 WAC men's basketball standings
	Conf.				Overall
Team	W		L	PCT	W		L	PCT
Utah State	14	–	2	.875	27	–	7	.794
Nevada	11	–	5	.688	21	–	13	.618
New Mexico State†	11	–	5	.688	22	–	11	.667
Louisiana Tech	9	–	7	.563	24	–	11	.686
Fresno State	7	–	9	.438	15	–	18	.455
San Jose State	6	–	10	.375	14	–	17	.452
Idaho	6	–	10	.375	15	–	16	.484
Boise State	5	–	11	.313	15	–	17	.469
Hawai'i	3	–	13	.188	10	–	20	.333
† 2010 WAC tournament winner Rankings from AP Poll

The 2010 WAC men's basketball tournament was held at the Lawlor Events Center in Reno, Nevada from March 11 through March 13, 2010. The winner of the tournament was New Mexico State, who received an automatic bid to the 2010 NCAA Men's Division I Basketball Tournament and was crowned the Western Athletic Conference champion.

== Format ==
Seeding for the tournament was based on the standings from the regular season. The top eight teams qualified. In past years all nine teams qualified and the # 8 and # 9 teams would play an opening round game where the winner would play the # 1 seed. However, for 2010 the opening round game was eliminated.

Two quarterfinal games were broadcast on ESPNU. One semifinal and the championship game were broadcast on ESPN2.

== Bracket ==
Quarterfinals, Thursday, March 11
1	Utah State	84
8	Boise State	60
4	Louisiana Tech	74
5	Fresno State	66
3	New Mexico State	90
6	San Jose State	69
2	Nevada	87
7	Idaho	71

Semifinals, Friday, March 12
1	Utah State	85
4	Louisiana Tech	55
3	New Mexico State	80
2	Nevada	79

Championship, Saturday, March 13
1	Utah State	63
3	New Mexico State	69

Asterisk denotes game ended in overtime.
