= Marvin Menzies =

American college basketball coach (born 1961)

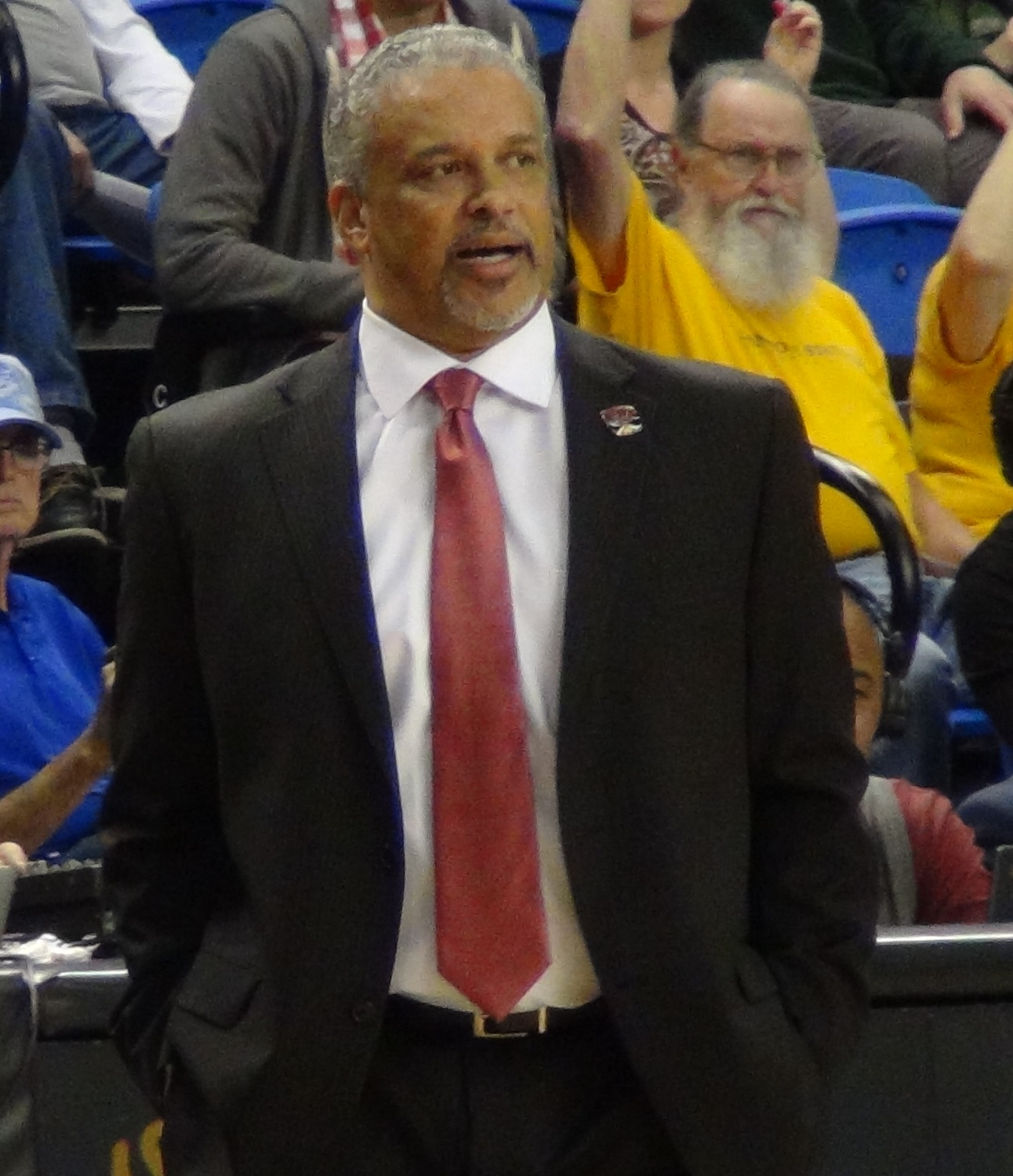
- Menzies in 2017 as UNLV head coach

Biographical details
- Born: October 15, 1961 (age 65); Los Angeles, California, U.S.
- Education: UCLA (BA, 1987); Sacramento State (MA, 2003)

Coaching career (HC unless noted)
- 1983–1991: Hamilton HS (assistant)
- 1991–1994: Santa Monica (assistant)
- 1994–1995: Santa Monica
- 1995–1996: Santa Monica (assistant)
- 1996–1997: Sacramento State (assistant)
- 1997–1999: Santa Monica (assistant)
- 1999–2003: San Diego State (assistant)
- 2003–2004: USC (assistant)
- 2004–2005: UNLV (assistant)
- 2005–2007: Louisville (assistant)
- 2007–2016: New Mexico State
- 2016–2019: UNLV
- 2019–2020: Grand Canyon (assoc. HC)
- 2022–2026: Kansas City

Head coaching record
- Overall: 290–243 (.544) (NCAA); 24–8 (.750) (JUCO)
- Tournaments: 0–5 (.000) (NCAA Division I); 0–1 (.000) (NIT)

Accomplishments and honors

Championships
- Western States Conference Regular Season (1995); 3× WAC regular season (2008, 2015, 2016); 5× WAC tournament (2010, 2012–2015)

Awards
- Western States Conference Coach of the Year (1995); WAC Coach of the Year (2015); Summit League Coach of the Year (2024)

Marvin Eugene Menzies (born October 15, 1961) is an American college basketball coach. He was most recently the men's head coach at the University of Missouri–Kansas City from 2022 to 2026. Previously, he was the head coach for New Mexico State, and UNLV.

== Early life and education ==
Menzies holds a bachelor's degree in economics from UCLA and a master's in education from California State University, Sacramento.

== Coaching career ==
=== New Mexico State ===
Menzies replaced previous New Mexico State coach Reggie Theus in 2007. Like Theus, Menzies came to NMSU after spending the previous two years as an assistant coach under Rick Pitino at Louisville. In fact, Menzies had been hired by Louisville to replace Theus when he left that institution to take the head coaching job at NMSU in 2005. The NMSU job was Menzies' first head coaching position at a four-year institution. Menzies was the 24th person to hold the head coaching position in the history of Aggie basketball. Prior to his stint at Louisville, Menzies had previously served as an assistant coach at USC, San Diego State and Sacramento State and had served as head coach at Santa Monica College. He came to NMSU with 14 years of collegiate coaching experience.

=== UNLV ===
Menzies was announced as UNLV head coach on April 17, 2016, as the successor to Chris Beard, who the previous week had accepted the head coaching position at Texas Tech. Fired from UNLV in March 2019, Menzies was replaced by former South Dakota State head coach T. J. Otzelberger.

=== Grand Canyon ===
Menzies was named as the associate head coach at Grand Canyon University on April 18, 2019. Menzies was not retained when Bryce Drew was named head coach of Grand Canyon in March 2020.

=== Kansas City ===
Menzies was hired as the head coach at Kansas City on April 26, 2022, after former coach Billy Donlon resigned to become an assistant coach at Clemson.

On January 12, 2026, after a 4–14 start, Kansas City announced that Menzies would not be retained after the 2025–26 season. At the time of the announcement, the Roos were two losses into a team season (and Menzies tenure) ending fifteen game losing streak.

== Head coaching record ==
Record table
Season	Team	Overall	Conference	Standing	Postseason
Santa Monica (California) College Corsairs (Western States Conference) (1994–1995)
1994–95	Santa Monica (California) College	24–8	9–1	1st	
Santa Monica (California) College:		24–8 (.750)	9–1 (.900)		
New Mexico State Aggies (Western Athletic Conference) (2007–2016)
2007–08	New Mexico State	21–14	12–4	T–1st	
2008–09	New Mexico State	17–15	9–7	T–3rd	
2009–10	New Mexico State	22–12	11–5	T–2nd	NCAA Division I Round of 64
2010–11	New Mexico State	16–17	9–7	T–3rd	
2011–12	New Mexico State	26–10	10–4	2nd	NCAA Division I Round of 64
2012–13	New Mexico State	24–11	14–4	3rd	NCAA Division I Round of 64
2013–14	New Mexico State	26–10	12–4	2nd	NCAA Division I Round of 64
2014–15	New Mexico State	23–11	13–1	1st	NCAA Division I Round of 64
2015–16	New Mexico State	23–11	13–1	1st	NIT First Round
New Mexico State:		198–111 (.641)	103–37 (.736)		
UNLV Runnin' Rebels (Mountain West Conference) (2016–2019)
2016–17	UNLV	11–21	4–14	11th	
2017–18	UNLV	20–13	8–10	T–7th	
2018–19	UNLV	17–14	11–7	T–4th	
UNLV:		48–48 (.500)	23–31 (.426)		
Kansas City Roos (The Summit League) (2022–2026)
2022–23	Kansas City	11–21	7–11	T–6th	
2023–24	Kansas City	16–16	10–6	T–2nd	
2024–25	Kansas City	13–20	4–12	8th	
2025–26	Kansas City	4–27	1–15	9th	
Kansas City:		44–84 (.344)	22–44 (.333)		
Total:		314–251 (.556)	157–113 (.581)		
National champion Postseason invitational champion Conference regular season champion Conference regular season and conference tournament champion Division regular season champion Division regular season and conference tournament champion Conference tournament champion
