= List of San Jose State University people =

The following is a list of notable persons (students, alumni, faculty or academic affiliates) associated with San José State University, located in the American city of San Jose, California.

== Notable alumni ==
=== Academia ===
- Bettina Aptheker (M.A. 1976) — author, professor, political activist
- Marshall Drummond (B.S. 1964, M.B.A. 1969) — former chancellor, California Community College System
- Harry Edwards (B.A. 1964) — professor emeritus of Sociology, University of California, Berkeley; author of The Revolt of the Black Athlete
- Terry Erwin (B.A. 1964, M.A. 1966) — entomologist, Smithsonian Institution
- Lawrence H. Keeley (B.A. 1970) — archaeologist; professor, University of Illinois Chicago; author of War Before Civilization
- Mary E. Lyons (M.A. 1976) — president, University of San Diego
- Sidney Siegel (B.A. 1951) — psychologist and economist, known for the Siegel–Tukey test and considered a founding father of experimental economics
- Henry Suzzallo (Dip.Ed. 1894) — former president, University of Washington
- Jennifer Wilby (M.S. 1992) — director of the Centre for Systems Studies, University of Hull
- Hamza Yusuf (B.A. 1997) — Islamic scholar

=== Artists and musicians ===
- Amber Aguirre (M.A. 1990, M.L.I.S. 1996) — ceramic sculptor
- Bernd Behr (attended 1995–98) — artist
- Mary Blair (B.F.A. 1931) — artist and illustrator who helped create Disney's Cinderella (1950), Alice in Wonderland (1951) and Peter Pan (1953)
- Lindsey Buckingham (attended 1968–70) — musician best known for Fleetwood Mac
- Doug Clifford — rock drummer best known for his work as a founding member of Creedence Clearwater Revival
- Stu Cook — bass guitarist best known for his work with Creedence Clearwater Revival (attended SJSU, but did not graduate)
- Binh Danh (B.F.A. 2002) —photographer noted for chlorophyll leaf prints and dauggerotypes of National Parks
- Irene Dalis (B.A. 1946) — New York Metropolitan Opera star and founder of Opera San Jose
- Allan Graham (attended 1965) — visual artist
- Robert Graham (attended 1961–63) — internationally acclaimed sculptor whose work includes the Olympic Gateway in Los Angeles
- PJ Hirabayashi (M.U.P. 1977)— co-founder of San Jose Taiko, recipient of National Heritage Fellowship
- Roy Hirabayashi — co-founder of San Jose Taiko, recipient of National Heritage Fellowship
- Shinichi Ishizuka — manga artist
- Tom Johnston — rock guitarist and vocalist best known for his work as a founding member of The Doobie Brothers
- Paul Kantner — rock guitarist best known for his work as a founding member of Jefferson Airplane
- Titus Kaphar (B.F.A. 2001) — contemporary painter and 2018 MacArthur Fellows Program Genius Award recipient
- David Kuraoka (B.A. 1970, M.A. 1971) — ceramic artist
- Peter Wayne Lewis (M.A. 1979) — Jamaican-American contemporary artist known for his large-scale abstract paintings
- Sal Maccarone (B.F.A. 1972) — nationally acclaimed woodworker and sculptor whose work includes The Spirit of Tenaya in Yosemite National Park
- Bryan "Brain" Mantia (A.M. 1985) — drummer, Primus, Guns N' Roses, Tom Waits, Buckethead
- Ann Millikan (B.A. 1986) — musician and composer
- Stevie Nicks (attended 1968–70) — musician best known for Fleetwood Mac

Stevie Nicks (attended 1968–70), musician best known for Fleetwood Mac

- Larry Norman (attended 1965) — Christian rock musician, singer and songwriter; founding member of the '60s rock band People!
- Fred H. Roster (M.A. 1968) — sculptor
- Na Omi Judy Shintani (B.S. 1980) — artist known for works about Japanese internment during WWII; CAAIAF 2023
- Patrick Simmons — rock guitarist and vocalist best known for his work as a founding member of The Doobie Brothers
- Gordon Smedt (attended 1982–84) — pop artist and painter
- Wayne Thiebaud (attended 1949–50) — painter
- Cal Tjader (attended 1946) — Grammy Award-winning jazz musician
- Michael Whelan (B.A. 1973) — artist and illustrator specializing in imaginative realism; Science Fiction Hall of Fame inductee

=== Authors ===
- Lorna Dee Cervantes (B.A. 1984) — poet, Pulitzer Prize nominee
- William J. Craddock (1967) — novelist, author of Be Not Content and Twilight Candelabra
- Carmen Giménez Smith (B.A.) — poet, American Book Award winner
- James D. Houston (B.A. 1965) — co-author of Farewell to Manzanar; author of Continental Drift, Snow Mountain Passage, and others; Lurie Distinguished Visiting professor of Creative Writing at SJSU in Spring 2006
- Jeanne Wakatsuki Houston (B.A. 1956) — co-author of Farewell to Manzanar
- Jayne Ann Krentz (M.A. 1971) — New York Times bestselling author
- Ella Leffland (B.A. 1953) — novelist (Rumors of Peace) and short story writer (Last Courtesies and Other Stories)
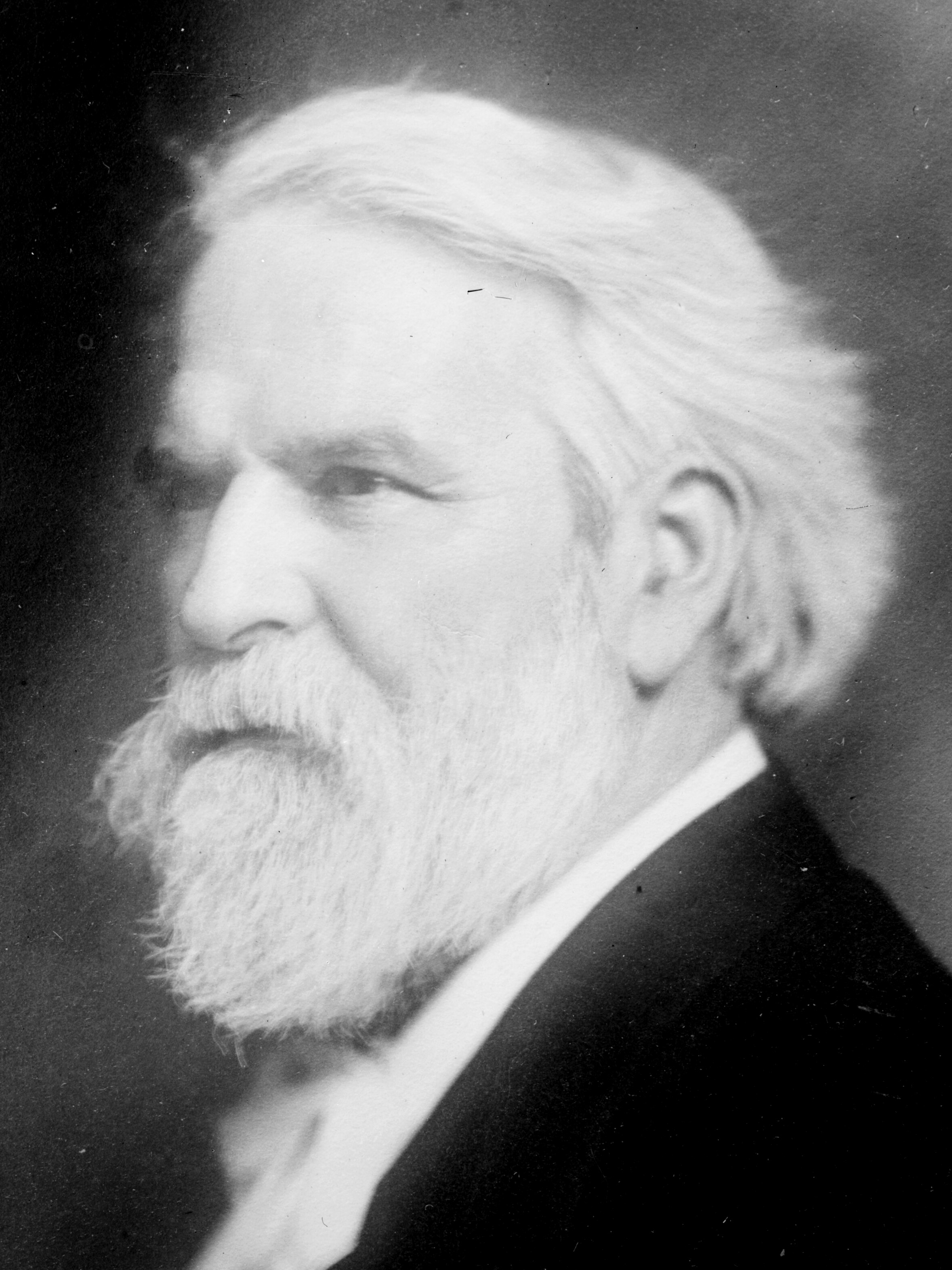
- Edwin Markham (DipEd, 1872), 1st Poet Laureate of Oregon, most known for "The Man with the Hoe"
  Edwin Markham (DipEd, 1872) — 1st Poet Laureate of Oregon, most known for "The Man with the Hoe"
- Patricia A. McKillip (B.A. 1971, M.A. 1972) — novelist
- Sandra McPherson (B.A.) — poet
- Robert Scoble (attended –1993) — blogger, author, and social media pioneer
- Amy Tan (B.A. 1972, M.A. 1973) — novelist; author of The Joy Luck Club

=== Aviation ===
- Jason Dahl (B.S. 1980) — airline pilot and United Airlines Flight 93 captain who died in the September 11 attacks

=== Business ===
- Terry Alderete (B.S.) — businesswoman
- Helder Antunes (B.S.) — senior director, Cisco Systems; chairman of the board, OpenFog Consortium
- James F. Boccardo (A.B. 1931) — trial lawyer, businessman, and philanthropist
- Finis Conner (B.A. 1969) — founder, Conner Peripherals and co-founder of Seagate Technology
- Ron Conway (B.A.) — billionaire angel investor and philanthropist; co-founder and former CEO of Altos Computer Systems
- Robert Frankenberg — former CEO, Novell
- Omid Kordestani (B.S. 1984) — senior vice president, Google
- Brian Krzanich (B.S. 1982) — CEO, CDK Global and former CEO, Intel Corporation
- Jenny Ming (B.A. 1978) — CEO, Charlotte Russe; former CEO of Old Navy

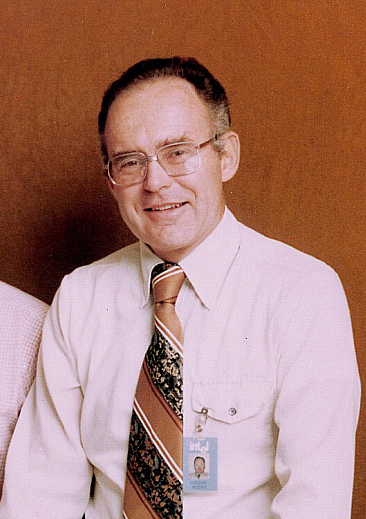
Gordon Moore (attended 1946–47), founder of the Intel Corporation and creator of "Moore's law"

- Gordon Moore (attended 1946–47) — founder of the Intel Corporation and creator of "Moore's law"
- Ed Oates (B.A. 1968) — co-founder, Oracle Corporation
- Daniel R. Scoggin (A.B. 1937) — founder and CEO, TGI Fridays
- Mike Sinyard (B.A. 1973) — founder and CEO, Specialized Bicycle Components
- James E. Thompson (B.S. 1962) — founder and chairman, Crown Worldwide Group

=== Film, theatre, and TV ===
- Stanley Anderson — actor, known for portraying Drew Carey's father on The Drew Carey Show
- Coby Bell (B.A. 1997) — actor; best known for his role as NYPD officer Tyrone Davis, Jr. on the NBC drama Third Watch
- Danny Lee Clark — actor, writer and producer; played Nitro on American Gladiators
- Rosanna DeSoto — film actress, best for her role of Connie Valenzuela in the 1987 film La Bamba
- Yousef Erakat (B.A. 2013) —actor, comedian, vlogger
- Debrah Farentino — film and television actress; model (attended SJSU; transferred to UCLA)
- Michael Forest — actor, known for portraying Apollo, on Star Trek
- Jerry Juhl (B.A. 1961) — head writer and producer for The Muppets and Fraggle Rock
- Omar Benson Miller (attended 1996–2001) — actor
- Steve Silver — founder of Beach Blanket Babylon, a popular cabaret show in San Francisco
- Kurtwood Smith — actor, best known for the role of Red Forman on That '70s Show
- The Smothers Brothers — comedians
- Bobbi Starr — pornographic actress
- Mychal Threets — librarian and media host; host of the YouTube revival of PBS series Reading Rainbow
- Luis Valdez (B.A. 1964) — Chicano playwright, screenwriter and director best known for his movie La Bamba

=== Journalism ===
- Chauncey Bailey — Oakland Post editor-in-chief; murdered in 2007
- Grant Brisbee — San Francisco Giants writer for The Athletic
- Earl Dotter — photojournalist documenting America's most dangerous jobs
- Kim Komenich — photojournalist, filmmaker and teacher; Pulitzer Prize winner (1987)
- John Kouns — photojournalist during the Civil Rights Movement
- Tony Kovaleski — broadcast journalist (KNTV-TV); multiple Emmy awards; winner of the Alfred I. duPont-Columbia University Award (2010)
- Hassina Leelarathna — Sri Lankan-American journalist
- Steve Lopez — newspaper columnist, Los Angeles Times; novelist
- Dave Meltzer —editor of the Wrestling Observer Newsletter
- Anacleto Rapping — photojournalist and teacher; three-time Pulitzer Prize winner
- Marcio Sanchez — photojournalist; Pulitzer Prize winner (2021)
- Steve Starr — photojournalist; Pulitzer Prize winner (1970)
- David Willman — reporter; Pulitzer Prize winner (2001)

=== Miscellaneous ===
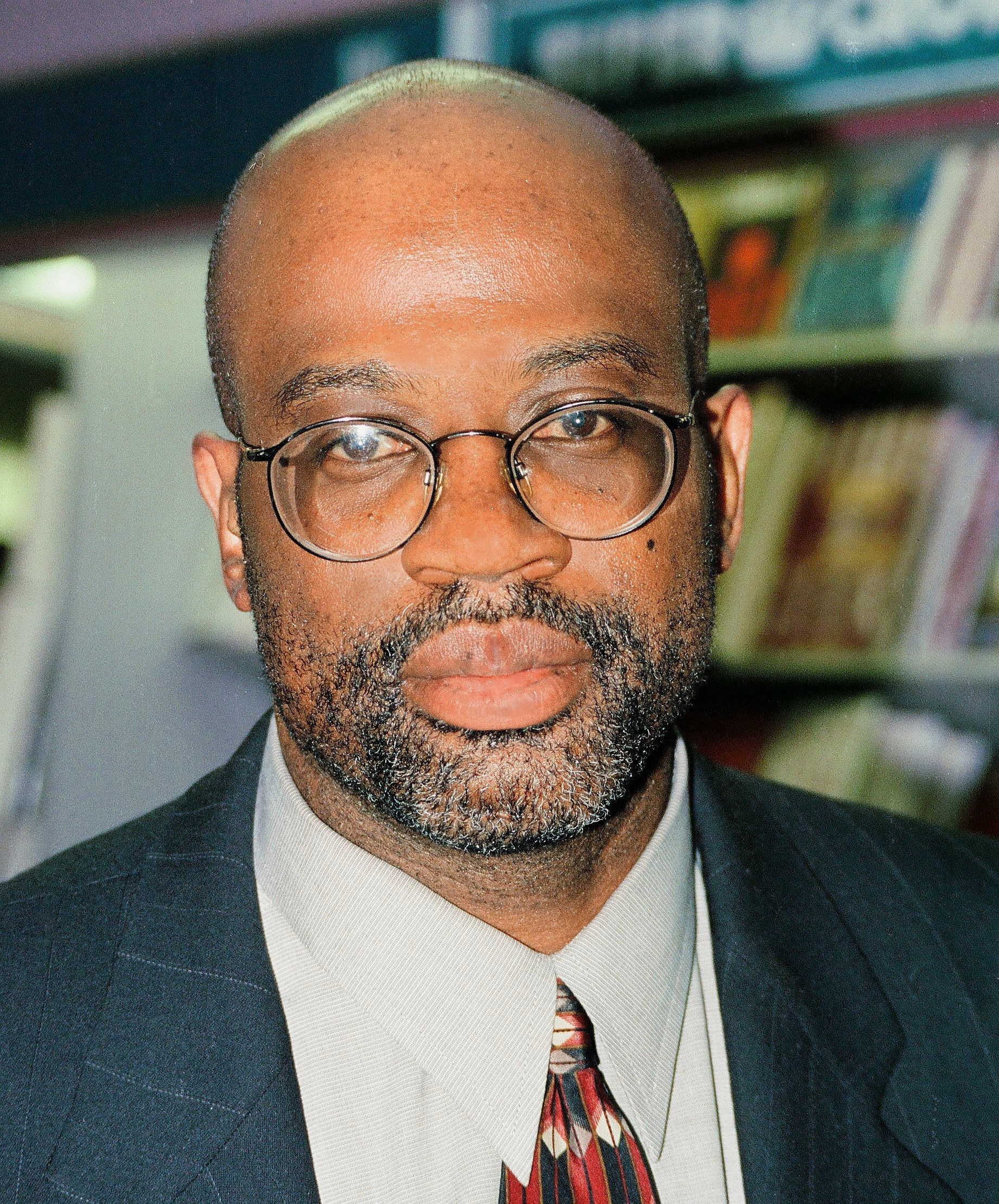
Christopher Darden (B.S. 1977), prosecutor in the O. J. Simpson murder case

- Christopher Darden (B.S. 1977) — prosecutor in the O. J. Simpson murder case
- Dirk Dirksen — godfather of San Francisco punk; tour manager for The Doors, Iron Butterfly, The Supremes and Ray Charles; owner of the Mabuhay Gardens punk club in San Francisco (attended SJSU, but did not graduate)
- Rob Janoff — graphic designer best known for his creation of the Apple logo
- Harry W. Jenkins — major general, U.S. Marine Corps
- Jessica McClintock — fashion designer
- Anthony Poshepny, aka Tony Poe — legendary CIA paramilitary officer
- Edward Soriano — lieutenant general, United States Army; as of April 2009, highest ranking Filipino American in the United States military

=== Politics and government ===
- Richard C. Baldwin — associate justice of the Oregon Supreme Court
- James T. Beall Jr. — California assemblyman, 24th district, and former Santa Clara County supervisor
- Lee P. Brown — former mayor of Houston; former police commissioner of New York City; former director of the Office of National Drug Control Policy
- Ben Nighthorse Campbell (B.A. 1957) — former U.S. senator from Colorado

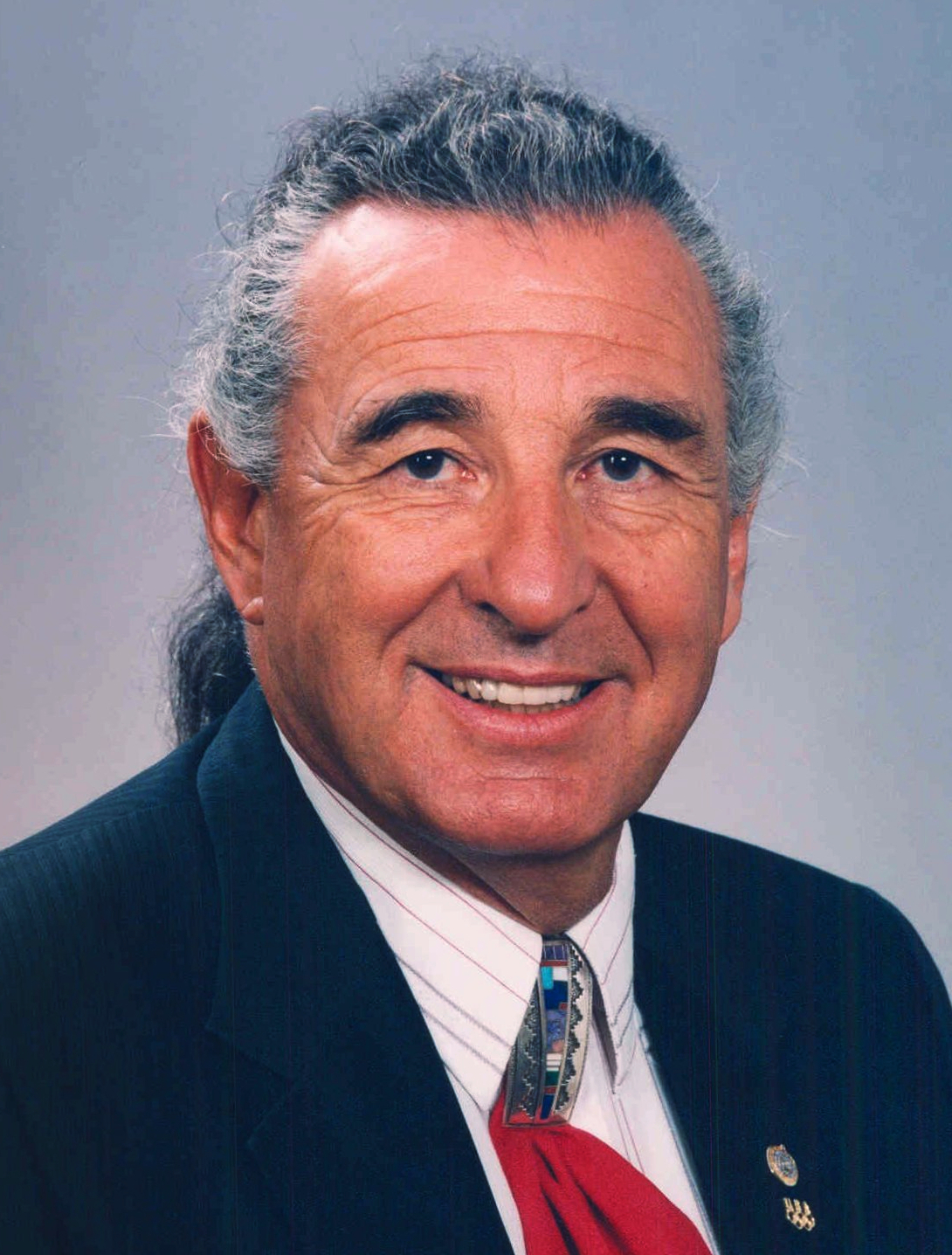
Ben Nighthorse Campbell (B.A. 1957), first Native American to be elected to the United States Senate

- Albert E. Carter — former U.S. congressman
- David C. Casas — former mayor of Los Altos and Los Altos city council member
- Cindy Chavez — former member of San Jose City Council and former vice mayor of San Jose
- Judy Chirco — San José City councilmember, District 9
- William Clark, Jr. — former U.S. ambassador to India
- Michael Deaver — deputy White House chief of staff for President Ronald Reagan
- Robert Doerr — former mayor of San Jose, California (1956–1958)
- Paul Fong — California assemblyman, 22nd district
- Robert "Bob" Foster — mayor of Long Beach, California; former president, Southern California Edison; former CSU trustee
- Mike Honda — U.S. representative from California
- Lou Henry Hoover (Dip.Ed. 1893) — former First Lady of the United States
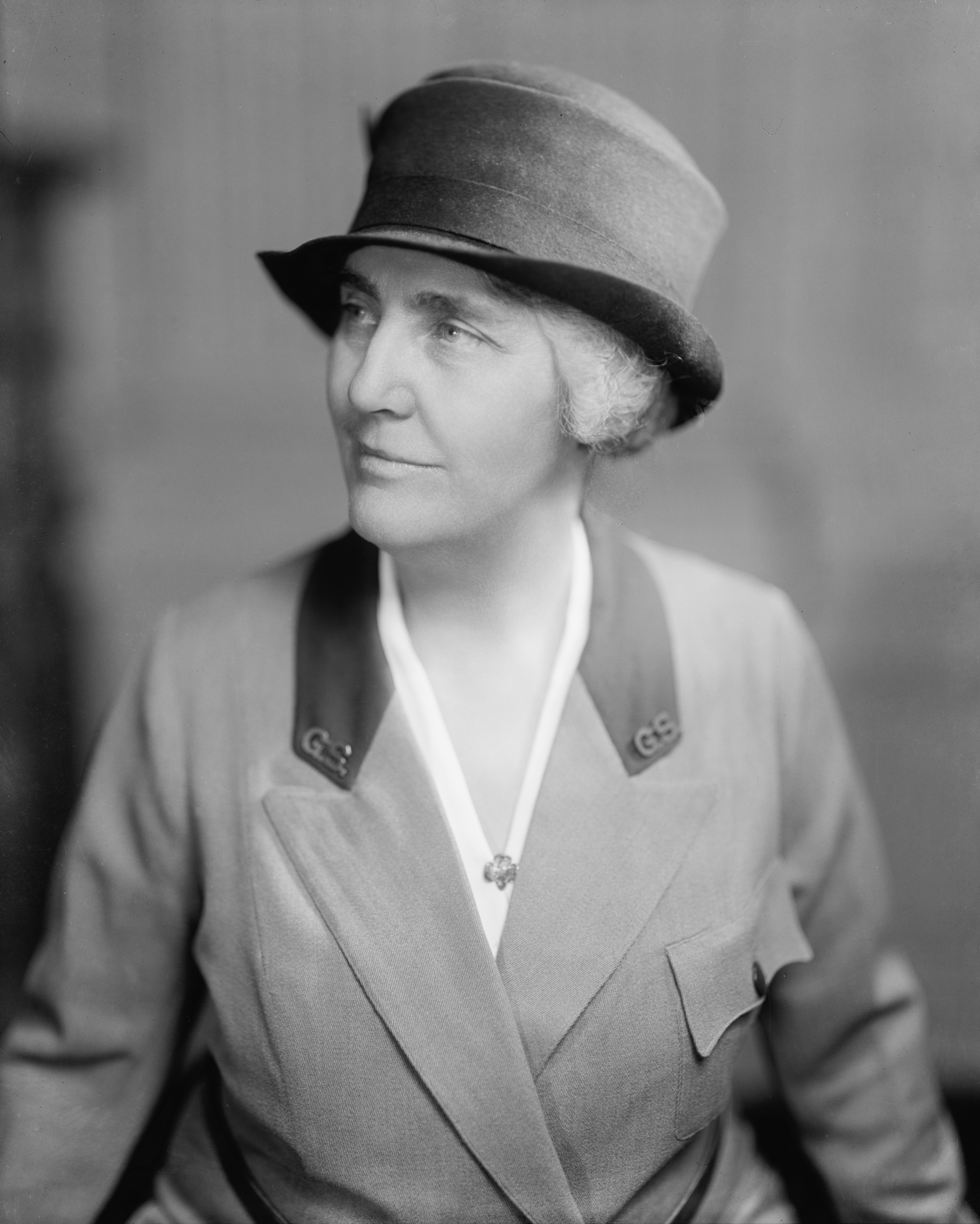
  Lou Henry Hoover (DipEd, 1893), philanthropist and former First Lady of the United States
- Johnny Khamis — councilmember on the San Jose City Council
- William Langdon — former associate justice of the California Supreme Court
- Linda J. LeZotte — San Jose City councilmember, District 1
- Evan Low — California state assemblyman; member of California Legislative LGBTQ Caucus
- Gus Morrison — mayor of Fremont, California (1985–1989; 1994–2004; 2012–2013)
- Gaylord Nelson — former U.S. senator; governor of Wisconsin; founder of Earth Day
- Lyn Nofziger — White House advisor to presidents Richard Nixon and Ronald Reagan
- Robert Rivas — 71st speaker of the California State Assembly
- Ed Rollins — national campaign director for Reagan–Bush (1984) and Mike Huckabee (2007); regular guest political analyst on CNN (attended SJSU; graduated from CSU Chico)
- Jim Silva — California state assemblyman; former mayor of Huntington Beach
- Laurie Smith — sheriff, Santa Clara County; first female county sheriff in the history of the state of California
- Fernando Torres-Gil — first assistant secretary for aging at the Department of Health and Human Services in the Clinton Administration; associate dean of the School of Public Affairs at UCLA
- Joe Trippi — presidential campaign manager for Howard Dean (2004)
- Aisha Wahab — California state senator, 10th district
- Carole Ward Allen — former BART board director, District 4; former Oakland port commissioner
- Kent Wiedemann — former U.S. ambassador to Cambodia
- Ken Yeager — politician, member of Santa Clara County Board of Supervisors

==== International politicians ====
- Yao Ching-ling — Taiwanese politician, magistrate of Taitung
- Amy Khor — Singaporean politician, senior minister of state for transport and senior minister of state for sustainability and the environment
- Morteza Mohammadkhan — Iranian politician, minister of finance
- Sim Tze Tzin — member of the Malaysian Parliament
- Mahmoud Vaezi — chief of staff of the president of Iran

=== Science and technology ===
- Barbara Bekins — hydrologist and National Academy of Engineering fellow
- Daniel W. Bradley — co-discoverer of hepatitis C
- Sarah Clatterbuck — computer engineer
- Ray Dolby — engineer, founder of Dolby Laboratories (studied two years at SJSU; graduated from Stanford University)
- Dian Fossey — ethologist and gorilla expert
- Charles Ginsburg — engineer, inventor of the videocassette recorder; National Inventors Hall of Fame inductee
- Jan Koum — billionaire entrepreneur, co-founder and CEO of WhatsApp; managing director at Facebook, Inc. (attended SJSU, but did not graduate)
- Gordon Moore — scientist, author of Moore's Law
- Roger Wakimoto — atmospheric scientist, tornado expert, director of NCAR and NSF
- James Lewis Wayman — 2013 fellow of the Institute of Electrical and Electronics Engineers

=== Sports ===
==== Baseball ====
- Jeff Ball — former Major League Baseball player, San Francisco Giants
- Aaron Bates — Major League Baseball player, Boston Red Sox
- Mike Brown — former Major League Baseball player, California Angels and Pittsburgh Pirates
- Ken Caminiti — former Major League Baseball player, Houston Astros et al.
- Anthony Chavez — former Major League Baseball player, California Angels
- Chris Codiroli — former Major League Baseball player, Oakland Athletics
- Kevin Frandsen — Major League Baseball player, Philadelphia Phillies
- Gary Hughes — former Major League Baseball assistant coach, Chicago Cubs
- Pat Hughes — play-by-play radio broadcaster for Chicago Cubs
- Jason Jimenez — former Major League Baseball player, Detroit Tigers and Tampa Bay Devil Rays
- Randy Johnson — former Major League Baseball player, Atlanta Braves
- Brad Kilby — Major League Baseball player, Oakland Athletics
- Hal Kolstad — former Major League Baseball player, Boston Red Sox
- Mark Langston — former Major League Baseball player, Seattle Mariners, California Angels, et al.
- Larry Lintz — former Major League Baseball player, Montreal Expos et al.
- John Oldham — former Major League Baseball player, Cincinnati Reds
- Sam Piraro — winningest head baseball coach in SJSU history
- Jason Simontacchi — former Major League Baseball player, St. Louis Cardinals and Washington Nationals
- Anthony Telford — former Major League Baseball player, Baltimore Orioles, Montreal Expos, et al.
- Carlos Torres — Major League Baseball player, Chicago White Sox

==== Basketball ====
- Tariq Abdul-Wahad (Olivier Saint-Jean) — former NBA player (Sacramento Kings)
- Jack Avina — former men's basketball coach for the Portland Pilots
- Ricky Berry — former NBA player (Sacramento Kings)
- Wil Carter — former basketball player who played professionally in the Netherlands, Cyprus, France, and Japan
- Marquin Chandler — former professional basketball player
- Brandon Clarke — NBA player (Memphis Grizzlies)
- Rick Darnell — former ABA player
- Coby Dietrick — former NBA player (San Antonio Spurs and Golden State Warriors)
- Tony Farmer — former NBA player
- Justin Graham — former professional basketball player
- Dick Groves — former NBA player (San Diego Rockets)
- Darnell "Dr. Dunk" Hillman — former NBA player (Indiana Pacers, New Jersey Nets et al.)
- Ed Hughes — former BAA player (Washington Capitols)
- Stu Inman — former NBA player and coach (Chicago Stags, Portland Trail Blazers, et al.)
- James Kinney — professional basketball player
- Steve McKean — former basketball coach for the New Zealand men's national basketball team
- Chris McNealy — former NBA player for the New York Knicks
- Walt McPherson — former San Jose Spartans head coach
- Omari Moore — current NBA player for the Milwaukee Bucks
- Adrian Oliver — former professional basketball player
- Wally Rank — former NBA player (San Diego Clippers)
- C. J. Webster — former professional basketball player
- Sid Williams — former NBA player (Portland Trail Blazers)

==== Football ====
- Courtney Anderson — former NFL tight end, Atlanta Falcons and Oakland Raiders
- Marcus Arroyo — head football coach, UNLV
- Stacey Bailey — former NFL wide receiver, Atlanta Falcons
- Keith Birlem — former SJSU quarterback, NFL player, member of San Jose State Hall of Fame
- Kim Bokamper — former NFL linebacker, Miami Dolphins
- John Broussard — NFL wide receiver, Jacksonville Jaguars
- Gill Byrd — former NFL defensive back, San Diego Chargers; two NFL Pro Bowl appearances
- Jim Cadile — former NFL guard, Chicago Bears
- Sheldon Canley — former NFL running back, San Francisco 49ers and New York Jets
- Matt Castelo — former NFL linebacker, Seattle Seahawks; former CFL linebacker, Hamilton Tiger-cats
- Andre Chachere — NFL safety, Philadelphia Eagles
- Steve Clarkson — nationally renowned quarterbacks coach; founder of Steve Clarkson Dreammaker quarterback camp
- Sherman Cocroft — former NFL defensive back, Kansas City Chiefs
- Neal Dahlen — former SJSU quarterback, NFL manager and scout; holds the record for the most earned Super Bowl rings at seven
- Rashied Davis — NFL wide receiver, Chicago Bears
- Yonus Davis — CFL running back, BC Lions
- Steve DeBerg — former NFL quarterback, Dallas Cowboys
- David Diaz-Infante — former NFL and CFL offensive guard, San Diego Chargers, Denver Broncos, Philadelphia Eagles, and Sacramento Gold Miners
- Oscar Donahue — former NFL wide receiver, Minnesota Vikings
- Terry Donahue — UCLA head football coach; College Football Hall of Fame inductee (attended SJSU for one year)
- Leon Donohue — former NFL offensive lineman, San Francisco 49ers and Dallas Cowboys
- Carl Ekern — former NFL linebacker, Los Angeles Rams; one NFL Pro Bowl appearance
- David Fales — NFL quarterback, New York Jets
- Wilson Faumuina — former NFL defensive tackle, Atlanta Falcons
- Mervyn Fernandez —former NFL wide receiver, Los Angeles Raiders
- Coye Francies — NFL defensive back, Cleveland Browns
- Chon Gallegos — former NFL quarterback with the Oakland Raiders
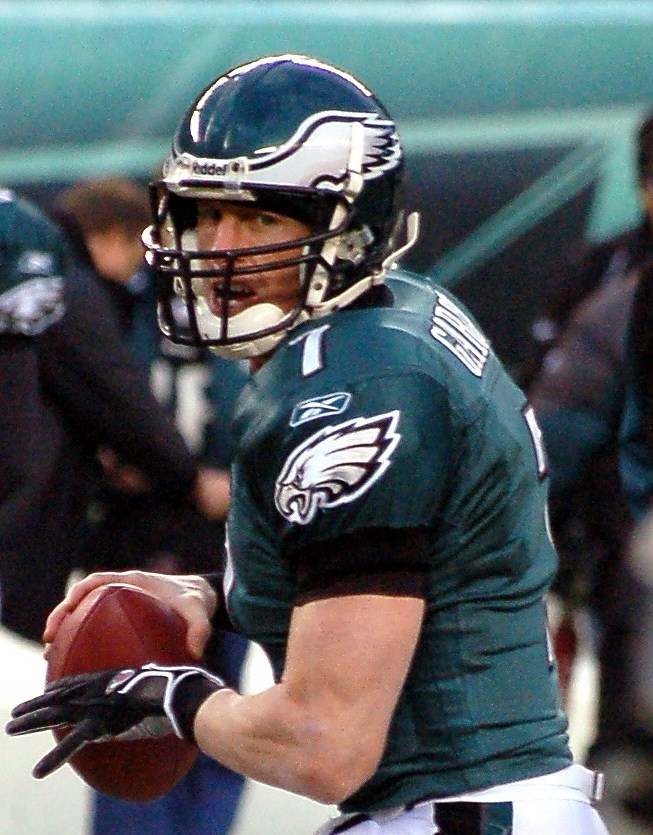
- Jeff Garcia (B.S. 1994) NFL quarterback, four NFL Pro Bowl appearances
  Jeff Garcia (B.S. 1994) — NFL quarterback, San Francisco 49ers et al.; four NFL Pro Bowl appearances
- Trestin George — CFL defensive back, BC Lions
- Jarron Gilbert — NFL defensive tackle, Chicago Bears
- Charley Harraway — former NFL running back, Washington Redskins and Cleveland Browns
- Paul Held — former NFL quarterback, Pittsburgh Steelers and Green Bay Packers
- Willie Heston (attended 1898–1900) — former SJSU halfback; College Football Hall of Fame inductee
- James Hodgins — former NFL fullback, St. Louis Rams et al.
- Duke Ihenacho — NFL safety, Denver Broncos
- Johnny Johnson — former NFL running back, New York Jets; one NFL Pro Bowl appearance; consensus choice for Rookie of the Year (1990)
- Cody Jones — NFL defensive tackle, Los Angeles Rams; one NFL Pro Bowl appearance
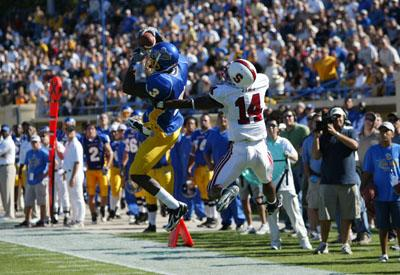
- James Jones catches a touchdown pass against Stanford in the 2006 Bill Walsh Legacy Game.
  James Jones — NFL wide receiver, Oakland Raiders
- Kevin Jurovich — former NFL wide receiver, Philadelphia Eagles; San Francisco 49ers
- Rick Kane — former NFL running back, Detroit Lions
- Keala Keanaaina — former American football fullback
- Bob Ladouceur — among winningest high school football coaches in U.S. history; coached De La Salle High Spartans to 151 consecutive wins 1992–2003
- Bill Leavy — NFL referee; officiated Super Bowl XL
- Josh Love — former NFL quarterback for the Los Angeles Rams and the Cleveland Browns
- Dwight Lowery — NFL defensive back, New York Jets and two-time All-American at SJSU
- Ken Lutz — former Arena Football League quarterback, Columbus Thunderbolts, San Antonio Force, player
- Frank Manumaleuga — former NFL linebacker, Kansas City Chiefs
- Frank Minini — former NFL halfback, Chicago Bears, Pittsburgh Steelers
- Nick Nash — Unanimous All-American, NFL wide receiver, Washington Commanders
- Joe Nedney — NFL kicker, San Francisco 49ers
- William Yaw Obeng — Arena Football League lineman, San Jose SaberCats
- Josh Oliver — NFL tight end, Baltimore Ravens
- Chris Owens — NFL defensive back, Atlanta Falcons
- Mike Perez — former NFL quarterback, New York Giants; named 1987 Big West Conference Offensive Player of the year, 1987 Pop Warner Trophy recipient and 1986 National UPI Player of the Year
- Tom Petithomme — former AFL player, San Jose Sabercats
- Art Powell — NFL wide receiver, Oakland Raiders; Raiders' 7th all-time leading receiver
- Waylon Prather — former NFL punter, New Orleans Saints, New York Jets and Arizona Cardinals
- Jim Psaltis — former NFL defensive back
- David Quessenberry — NFL offensive tackle, Buffalo Bills, Tennessee Titans and Houston Texans
- David Richmond — NFL wide receiver, Cincinnati Bengals
- Scott Rislov — AFL quarterback, San Jose SaberCats
- Saint Saffold — former NFL player, Cincinnati Bengals
- Al Saunders — former NFL head coach for the San Diego Chargers
- Wes Schweitzer — former NFL offensive linemen with the New York Jets
- Rufus Skillern — CFL and NFL wide receiver, BC Lions and Baltimore Ravens
- Gerald Small — former NFL defensive back, Miami Dolphins
- Keith Smith — NFL fullback and former linebacker, Atlanta Falcons, Oakland Raiders and Dallas Cowboys
- Shane Smith — former NFL fullback, New York Giants and New Orleans Saints
- Carl Sullivan — former NFL defensive end, Green Bay Packers
- Adam Tafralis — CFL quarterback, Hamilton Tiger-Cats
- Tyson Thompson — NFL kick returner, Dallas Cowboys
- Bob Titchenal — former NFL linebacker, Washington Redskins and Los Angeles Dons; one Pro Bowl appearance; former head football coach, University of New Mexico and SJSU
- Paul Varelans — retired professional MMA fighter formerly with the UFC
- Dick Vermeil — NFL head coach; winning coach, Super Bowl XXXIV
- Bill Walsh (B.A. 1955) — NFL head coach; winning coach, Super Bowl XVI, Super Bowl XIX, and Super Bowl XXIII; Pro Football Hall of Fame inductee

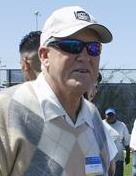
Bill Walsh (B.A, 1955), football coach in the Pro Football Hall of Fame and three time Super Bowl champion

- Gerald Willhite — former NFL running back, Denver Broncos
- Billy Wilson — former NFL receiver, San Francisco 49ers; six NFL Pro Bowl appearances
- Louis Wright — former NFL defensive back, Denver Broncos; 1st round NFL draft pick; five NFL Pro Bowl appearances
- Roy Zimmerman — former NFL quarterback, Washington Redskins; one Pro Bowl appearance

==== Golf ====
- Danielle Ammaccapane — LPGA Tour golfer
- Ron Cerrudo — PGA golfer and tour winner
- Bob Eastwood — PGA golfer and tour winner
- Pat Hurst — LPGA golfer and tour winner; #16 on the all-time LPGA money list
- Juli Inkster — LPGA golfer; two-time U.S. Women's Open winner (1999 and 2002); #4 on the all-time LPGA money list
- Mark Lye — PGA golfer and tour winner
- Roger Maltbie — PGA golfer and tour winner
- Janice Moodie — LPGA golfer and tour winner
- Arron Oberholser — PGA golfer; AT&T Pebble Beach National Pro-Am winner (2006)
- Patty Sheehan — LPGA golfer; two-time U.S. Women's Open winner (1992 and 1994)
- Ken Venturi — PGA golfer; 1964 U.S. Open winner and Sports Illustrated "Sportsman of the Year"
- Mark Wiebe — PGA golfer and tour winner

==== Judo ====
- Howard Fish —1967 Summer Universiade; bronze medalist
- Taylor Ibera — 2008 Pan American Judo Championships gold medalist
- Paul Maruyama — three-time USA Judo National Champion
- Amy Tong — 1999 Pan American Judo Championships bronze medalist
- George Uchida — 1972 Olympic judo coach
- Yoshihiro Uchida — head coach, SJSU judo team; team coach, 1964 U.S. Olympic judo team; instrumental in developing organized intercollegiate judo competition in the U.S.

==== Olympic Games ====
- Charles Adkins — 1952 Olympian (boxing); gold medalist
- Kevin Asano — 1988 Olympian (judo); silver medalist; USA Judo Hall of Fame inductee
- Sandra Bacher —1992, 1996, and 2000 Olympian (judo); sixteen-time USA Judo medalist
- Bob Berland — 1984 Olympian (judo); silver medalist
- Felix Böhni — 1980 and 1984 Olympian (pole vault)
- Suzannah Brookshire-Gonzales — 2020 Olympian (softball)
- Colton Brown — 2016 and 2020 Olympian (judo)
- Ed Burke — 1964 and 1968 Olympian (track and field), USA flagbearer at the 1984 Opening Ceremonies in Los Angeles
- Robin Campbell — 1984 Olympian (track and field – 800 metres)
- John Carlos (attended 1968–1969) — 1968 Olympian (track and field – 200 meters); bronze medalist; best known for giving raised fist salute from the medalists' podium during the 1968 Summer Olympic Games in Mexico City

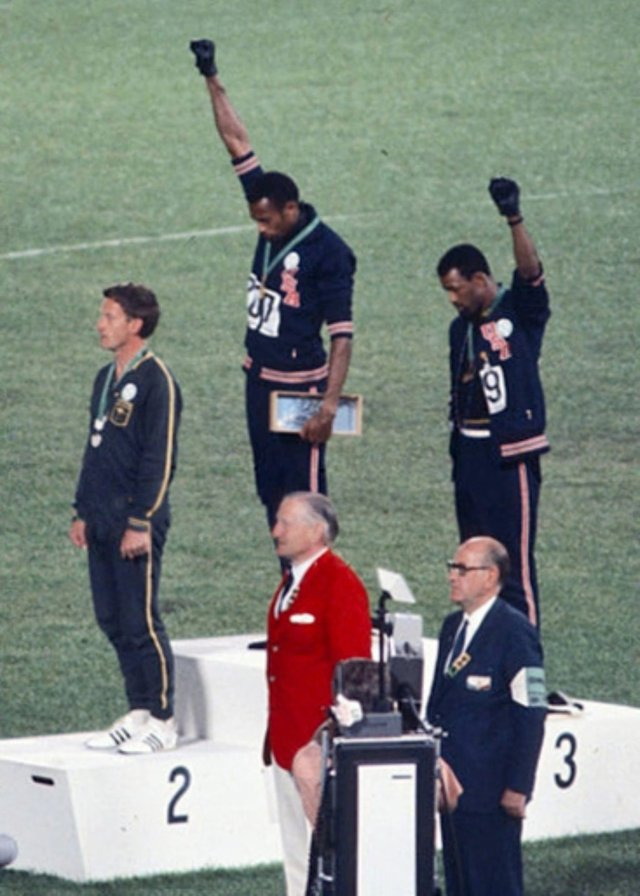
John Carlos (right) (attended 1968–69) and Tommie Smith (center) (B.A., 1969), track and field athletes known for a 1968 civil rights protest

- Dedy Cooper — 1980 Olympian (track and field – 110 meter hurdles)
- Michelle Cox — 2020 Olympian (softball)
- Jim Doehring — 1992 Olympian (track and field – shot put); silver medalist
- Emma Entzminger — 2020 Olympian (softball)
- Clara Espar Llaquet — 2020 Olympian (water polo); silver medalist
- Lee Evans — 1968 Olympian (track and field – 4×400 meters and 400 meters); two-time gold medalist and world record holder
- Jeff Fishback — 1964 Olympian (track and field)
- George Haines — swim coach for seven U.S. Olympic teams; head swim coach at UCLA and Stanford University
- Steve Hamann — 1980 Olympian (water polo)
- Mike Hernandez — 1972 Olympian (soccer)
- Mitch Ivey — 1968 and 1972 Olympian (swimming); silver and bronze medalist
- Margaret Jenkins — 1928 Olympian (track and field)
- Stacey Johnson — 1980 Olympian (fencing)
- Marti Malloy — 2012 Olympian (judo); bronze medalist
- Keith Nakasone — 1980 Olympian (judo)
- Ben Nighthorse Campbell — 1964 Olympian (judo)
- Ray Norton — 1960 Olympian (track and field)
- Christos Papanikolaou — 1968 Olympian (track and field – pole vault); world record holder (first man over 18 feet)
- John Powell — 1976 and 1984 Olympian (track and field – discus); two-time bronze medalist
- Raju Rai — 2008 Olympian (men's singles badminton)
- Ronnie Ray Smith — 1968 Olympian (track and field athlete – 4 × 100 meters); gold medalist and world record holder
- Tommie Smith (B.A. 1969) — 1968 Olympian (track and field athlete – 200 meters); gold medalist; best known for giving raised fist salute from the medalists' podium during the 1968 Summer Olympic Games
- Willie Steele —1948 Olympian (track and field – long jump); gold medalist
- Robyn Stevens — 2020 Olympian (20k race walking)
- Jill Sudduth — 1996 Olympian (synchronized swimming): gold medalist
- Mike Swain — 1988 Olympian (judo); bronze medalist; first American male to win the World Judo Championships
- Taylor Takata — 2008 Olympian (judo)
- Lynn Vidali — 1968 and 1972 Olympian (swimming); silver and bronze medalist
- Jim Zylker — 1972 Olympian (soccer)

==== Other ====
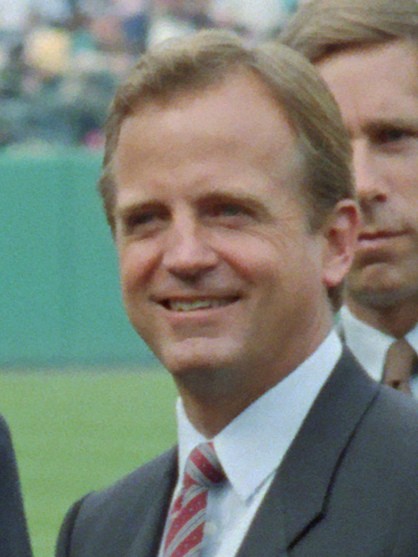
Peter Ueberroth (B.A. 1959) Major League Baseball Commissioner; U.S. Olympic Committee chair; Time magazine's "Man of the Year"

- C.J. Brown — MLS soccer player (Chicago Fire)
- Joey Chestnut — competitive eater; world record holder
- Shane Golobic — dirt track racing driver
- Krazy George Henderson — professional cheerleader and inventor of the audience wave
- Ryan Lowe — ECHL goaltender (Utah Grizzlies)
- Ernie Reyes Sr. — world-renowned martial artist
- Tony Reyes — Professional Bowlers Association member; 17th bowler to throw a perfect 300 game on television; PBA tour winner
- Peter Schifrin — (born 1958), Olympic fencer and NCAA champion; sculptor
- Ryan Suarez — former MLS soccer player (Los Angeles Galaxy and Dallas Burn)
- Peter Ueberroth (B.A. 1959) — Major League Baseball Commissioner (1984–1989); U.S. Olympic Committee chair; Time magazine's "Man of the Year"
- Robert Wall — actor and martial artist
- Justin Willis — professional mixed martial artist, current UFC heavyweight

=== Fictional alumni ===
- Amir Qadiri — protagonist of the novel The Kite Runner

== Faculty and staff ==
- James J. Asher — professor emeritus of psychology; inventor of Total Physical Response (TPR)
- Dwight Bentel — driving force behind the development of the SJSU School of Journalism and Mass Communications
- Elbert Botts — former chemistry professor; California Department of Transportation employee; inventor of Botts dots
- Celia Correas de Zapata — former Spanish professor; world expert on Latin American women's fiction; widely published author
- Paul Douglass — English professor; renowned literary scholar; winner of the 2007 Elma Dangerfield award for his publication of new and original work related to the life and times of the poet Lord Byron;
- Bob Gliner — emeritus faculty of sociology
- Daniel Goldston — mathematics professor; developed breakthrough methods for proving there are arbitrarily large primes that are unusually close together
- Lou Harrison — former composer-in-residence; world-renowned composer
- Fred Iltis — Holocaust emigre and entomologist
- Persis Karim — former co-director of the Persian Studies Program, and professor
- Jessica Mitford — former sociology professor; renowned muckraking journalist; author of The American Way of Death
- Bruce Ogilvie — psychology professor; renowned sports psychologist
- Sam Richardson — post-war artist known for minimalist sculpture
- Rudy Rucker — former computer science professor; renowned science fiction author; often credited as a founding father of cyberpunk
- Frederick Spratt — art professor (1956–1989) and art department chair; known for his Color Theory paintings; founder of the Frederick Spratt Gallery in San Jose
- Shelby Steele — former English professor; writer; documentary filmmaker; author of The Content of our Character; Emmy Award winner; National Book Critics Circle Award winner
- Allen Strange — professor emeritus of music; renowned musician and composer; author of Electronic Music: Systems, Techniques, and Controls, a key text on modular analog synthesis; author of other texts on modern music practices
- Jacqueline Thurston — professor emerita of Art; visual artist and writer
- Lloyd (Bud) Winter — track coach; produced over 100 All-Americans and nine Olympians at SJSU; coached SJSU track team to two NCAA national titles; National Track and Field Hall of Fame inductee; author of So You Want to be a Sprinter
