= Jose Villa =

American fine art wedding photographer

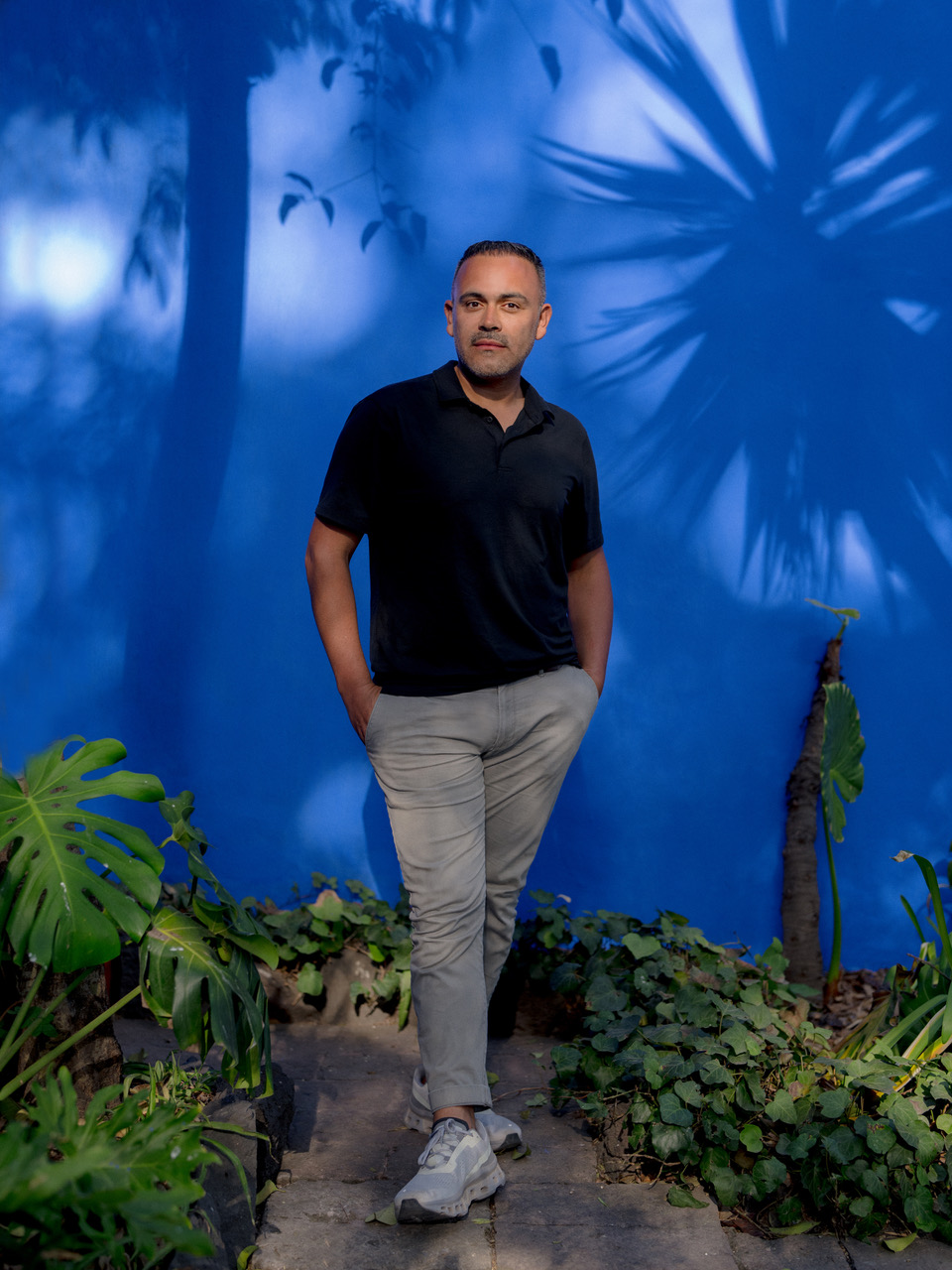
- Jose Villa in California
- Born: Jose Villa; September 15, 1980 (age 46); Los Guerrero, Mexico
- Education: Brooks Institute of Photography
- Occupation: photographer
- Years active: 2001 — date
- Style: film photography; wedding photography; fine art photography
- Spouse: Joel Serrato (m. 2011)

Jose Villa (born 15 September 1980) is an American fine art wedding photographer known for his work with natural light and film photography. He is the exclusive photographer of various celebrity weddings, including those of Justin Bieber and Hailey Baldwin, Demi Lovato and Jordan Lutes, Hailee Steinfeld and Josh Allen, and Priyanka Chopra and Nick Jonas. He was named among the top 10 wedding photographers in the world by Harper's Bazaar and American Photo, and his work has appeared in publications such as Vogue, Harper’s Bazaar, People, Martha Stewart Weddings, Instyle Weddings, Brides, Essence, Town & Country, American Photo, Hello!, Fortune and New York Times.

== Background and early life ==
Villa was born in Los Guerrero, Mexico and moved to Solvang, California where he was raised on a farm ranch. He developed an interest in photography during his high school years, initially focusing on portraiture. He pursued a degree in photography at the Brooks Institute of Photography in Santa Barbara, California, where he developed a passion for film photography.

== Career ==
Villa began his career photographing children’s sessions before transitioning into wedding photography. After eight years in the industry, he gained traction when he photographed the wedding of Martha Stewart’s niece in Las Vegas, a milestone that led to full-page spreads in Martha Stewart Weddings magazine. The exposure opened the door to more high-profile assignments. According to Vogue Australia, Villa has photographed four of the eighteen most extravagant weddings in the magazine’s history. He was named one of the world's top 10 wedding photographers by Harper's Bazaar and by American Photo in 2008.

Villa has served as the exclusive photographer for the weddings of numerous celebrities, including Nick Jonas and Priyanka Chopra. His photograph of the couple appeared on the cover of lifestyle magazines Hello! and People

Additional celebrity weddings photographed by him include Justin Bieber and Hailey Baldwin, as well as Paris Hilton and Carter Reum — both featured prominently by Vogue and People magazines. He also captured the weddings of Samira Wiley and Lauren Morelli, Tobias Alexander Engel and Ivy Getty, Demi Lovato and Jordan Lutes, Adam Housley and Tamera Mowry, and Hailee Steinfeld and Josh Allen. Some other celebrity weddings he covered include the weddings of Becca Bloom and David Pownall, and Temi Otedola and Mr Eazi.

Villa authored the book Fine Art Wedding Photography: How to Capture Images with Style for The Modern Bride. He founded the Fine Art direction and he created his preset collections on DVLOP titled For the Love of Film: Kodak, Fuji, B&W and Studio, to recreate his signature film look using digital tools like Lightroom, Camera Raw, and Capture One.

== Style ==
Jose Villa’s style is defined by soft, romantic, and ethereal imagery, often achieved through natural light and medium format film. He also incorporates digital photography in his work. His work blends fine art and fashion influences, resulting in photographs that are both visually striking and emotionally resonant. He credits his upbringing on a farm ranch in Solvang, California for shaping his appreciation and perception of light and warmth. Villa’s signature look is achieved using the Contax 645 medium format film camera paired with Zeiss lenses and Kodak Portra film — a combination known for producing soft, romantic images with sharpness, natural color, and wide exposure latitude.

== Personal life ==
He is married to photographer Joel Serrato and is established in Santa Barbara, California.
