= Brooks Institute =

Private art college in California, U.S. (1945–2016)

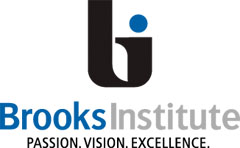
- Motto: Passion. Vision. Excellence.
- Type: Private for-profit art school
- Active: 1945–2016
- President: Edward Clift
- Provost: Victoria Liptak
- Location: Ventura and Santa Barbara, California, U.S.
- Campus: Suburban
- Website: www.brooks.edu, defunct

The Brooks Institute was a private for-profit art school in Ventura, California. It was formerly the Brooks Institute of Photography and was originally based in Montecito and Santa Barbara. Brooks Institute offered four majors and two graduate programs. The college was last owned by Gphomestay. The college consolidated and moved operations from Santa Barbara to the Ventura Campus before autumn 2015.

The college abruptly announced it was closing on August 12, 2016. The last term was the summer 2016 semester. Enrollment had declined by 90% to 250 students, completion rates ranged from 3% to 40% by program, and there was controversy surrounding advertising using inflated job placement rates, unusual loan policies, and surprise fees.

== History ==
=== Brooks family ===
Brooks Institute of Photography was founded in 1945 by Ernest H. Brooks Sr. over a bakery on State Street in Santa Barbara, California. The school's first photography students were primarily World War II veterans supported by the G.I. Bill.

In 1952, the Brooks family purchased the former David Gray estate 'Graholm' after the owner at that time, Herschel McGraw, died. Ernest purchased the property for $61,000. The property was located on Alston Road in Montecito, a community adjacent to Santa Barbara. This served as the home of Brooks Institute of Photography, as well as for Ernest H. Brooks, Sr.'s growing family.

Ernest H. Brooks Sr. stayed on as president of the school until 1971, when he became board chairperson. He died in 1990. His personal passion for underwater photography inspired the underwater still photography and video courses that started in the late 1960s, and continued until the school closed.

At the time of his retirement as president, his son, Ernest H. Brooks, Jr. 'stepped into his father's shoes' and served as the school's president from 1971 until 1999. He continued to expand the Brooks Institute of Photography facilities.

In 1976 Brooks purchased the former Jefferson School in the Riviera neighborhood of Santa Barbara, that had been slated for demolition, and opened the Brooks Jefferson Campus.

Brooks Institute has been involved in many extraordinary projects in recent years, but this forward vision and involvement was happening even in the 1980s when the institute was permitted to photograph the Shroud of Turin. Professor Vernon Miller, then head of the Industrial/Scientific program, led a team of photographers as they photographed the cloth for documentation and study.

=== Career Education Corporation ownership ===
In 1999 the Brooks Institute of Photography was sold by Ernest H. Brooks Jr. to Career Education Corporation (CEC), a for-profit higher education corporation. CEC expanded the school. That included the acquisition of an 8 acres (3.2 ha) former movie production studio in Ventura in 2002, from which to base the school's motion picture program, later becoming the Ventura Campus for consolidating the entire school.

In 2007, the school changed its name to the Brooks Institute, from the Brooks Institute of Photography.

In 2011, Brooks Institute moved its programs and offices located on the Brooks Jefferson Campus in Santa Barbara to the new Ventura Campus. In 2014 it moved the programs, library, and offices at the Mason Street Campus (Santa Barbara) to the Cota Street Campus in Downtown Santa Barbara, before the final move to the Ventura Campus.

==== Campus consolidation ====
In 2013 Brooks announced its consolidation of all its educational programs to the Ventura Campus, and departure from Santa Barbara planned for 2015. From the Cota Street Campus in Santa Barbara, it moved its Professional Photography baccalaureate program in Autumn 2013 and MFA in Photography in Autumn 2014 to its now solo Ventura Campus, where the other baccalaureate programs in Film, Graphic Design, and Visual Journalism were already located.

=== Gphomestay ownership ===
In June 2015 the Brooks Institute was sold by CEC to Gphomestay—Massachusetts Homestay Company, a Waltham, Massachusetts-based company that specializes in finding homes for international students studying abroad in the United States. In July Gphomestay announced Edward Clift as president, and Victoria Liptak as provost of Brooks. In August 2016, Edward Clift was dismissed as president and a majority of the board of directors resigned. On August 12, 2016, Brooks Institute announced it was closing and canceled the Fall 2016 semester.

== Campus and student life ==
Brooks Institute completed consolidating all its visual arts education programs and facilities for new students onto one campus in the Autumn of 2014, the Ventura Campus, located on North Ventura Avenue in the city of Ventura. The Professional Photography Program and MFA, Visual Journalism, Film and Video Production, Business Administration and Graphic Design programs' classes shared the single campus, "providing cross-platform opportunities in one location." The Brooks Library was on the campus, containing thousands of books, journals, and other publications and media.

Brooks Institute had a research vessel, 'Just Love,' on which Ernest H. Brooks II led a photographic research and travel expedition to the Sea of Cortez in 1986.

Brooks Institute had two public art galleries that display student, faculty, alumni, and guest photographer work: the Gallery 27 at the former Cota Street Campus in Santa Barbara; and the Visions Gallery in Ventura, operated in conjunction with the Marriott Ventura Beach.

=== Ventura Campus ===
The Ventura campus housed faculty and administrative offices and offers serviced such as counseling, financial aid, academic affairs, admissions, accounting, career services and the library.

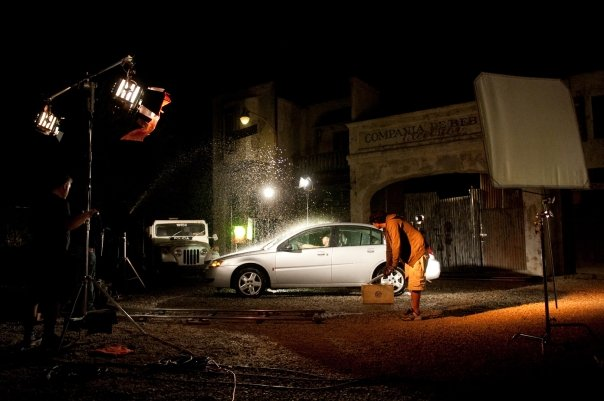
Students filming a project on the on-campus movie set "The Mexican Village".

Film

Before Brooks Institute acquired the Ventura Campus and renovated its buildings for the school, the property was used by 'Hollywood' movie production companies to shoot motion pictures. The Ventura Campus contained professional sound stages, a screening room, digital video editing studios, a post-production facility, and a movie backlot with an outdoor movie set.

Scenes from both Titanic and Cast Away were shot on there. In 2010 "The Mexican Village" movie set was used for filming the feature film Without Men, directed by Gabriela Tagliavini.

==== Visual Journalism Program ====
The Visual Journalism Program had a documentary-focused class. This was a class-based program that all Brooks undergraduates can participate in. The documentary class took students all over the world to document various cultures. Students spent a scholastic session (approximately 2 months) in another country and return to California to edit a multimedia presentation. The documentary class took students to many countries, including: Ireland, India, Mexico, Cuba, West Africa, Czech Republic, Costa Rica, Australia, Argentina, China and Chile.

== Accreditation ==
Brooks was nationally accredited by the Accrediting Council for Independent Colleges and Schools which offered accreditation to mostly vocational schools.

Up until the mid-1980s, Brooks Institute was the only national level university program regionally accredited to offer a full Bachelor of Arts degree in photographic sciences, underwritten by WASC. But because of financial reporting irregularities discovered during its reaccreditation cycle, Brooks lost its standing with WASC and sought accreditation through other oversight bodies. Ernest Brooks II, president of the institute and son of founder Ernest Brooks, eventually lost control of the institute and surrendered his role as president shortly thereafter.

In August 2008, Brooks Institute had successfully completed "Eligibility," the first step to receiving regional accreditation by the Western Association of Schools and Colleges (WASC). However, at the time of its closing, Brooks did not have regional accreditation.

== Controversy ==
In July 2005, the California Bureau for Private Postsecondary and Vocational Education (BPPVE) accused the Brooks Institute of Photography and its then parent corporation Career Education Corporation of persuading prospective students to enroll by "willfully misleading" them, and "falsifying and omitting critical information." Brooks was given only a conditional approval to operate for the next two years with a hearing scheduled for February 2006, and ordered to provide "equitable restitution" to students going back to 1999. However, Brooks appealed the decision and at the hearing the judge determining that BPPVE had not complied with the mandatory provisions of the Education Code, and that it had wrongly denied Brooks Institute an opportunity to contest the Bureau's action prior to the time it was imposed. The California Department of Consumer Affairs (which oversees BPPVE) later reached the same conclusion. Although Brooks ultimately received unconditional renewal of its license, it settled with a class action lawsuit for $12,250,000.

=== Restructuring ===
In November 2008, Brooks laid off five faculty members and 12 staff members as part of a restructuring. The school reports that its enrollment dropped from 2,300 in 2004 to 1,200 in 2008. The restructuring was in addition to the faculty who had been 'seemingly dismissed' in recent years. Together these created tensions at Brooks Institute going back to January 2007.

In 2015 Gphomestay purchased the Brooks Institute from Career Education Corporation, and appointed new leadership.

== Notable faculty and alumni ==
Some notable alumni and faculty include:

=== Faculty ===
- Anacleto Rapping
- Paul F. Ryan, Film faculty, director of Home Room
- Tracy Trotter, Film faculty member and principal of Trotter Productions, received his third Emmy in 2008 for directing the Public Service Announcement, "Voter."
- Michael W. Fortune - Photography faculty.

=== Alumni ===
- Douglas Bizzaro, Fashion photographer, clients include Jean Paul Gaultier and Chrome Hearts.
- Devyn Galindo, artist and filmmaker
- Mark Mabry, photographer, journalist, and activist.
- Javier Manzano, winner of the 2013 Pulitzer Prize for Feature Photography for his work in Syria. He has also won two World Press Photo awards.
- James Neihouse, 1976 Professional Photography graduate, works with IMAX as their director of Photography.
- Lennette Newell, animal, advertising, fashion, commercial and wildlife photography
- Holly Randall, photographer, director and producer of pornographic films and podcast host
- Matt Revolter, film producer & photographer
- Jeremy Roloff, photographer
- Kevin Shulman, Writer, Producer, Director
- Michael Thompson, photographer; clients include W, Details, Allure, Harper's Bazaar, Vogue, Tiffany & Co., and DeBeers.
- Theeradej Wongpuapan, Thai actor
- Zoë Marieh Urness, photographer
- David Zimmerman, fine-art photographer & filmmaker

The film program at Brooks Institute began in the mid-1950s. Graduates include:

- Matt Alonzo, music video director
- Othman Karim, Award-winning Swedish film director and TV personality
- Isidore Mankofsky, Cinematography for The Muppet Movie and Somewhere in Time
- Jose Villa, wedding photographer

== See also ==
- Art schools in California
- List of art schools
- Film school
- Film schools in California
