= The Spartan Daily =

Student newspaper at San José State University

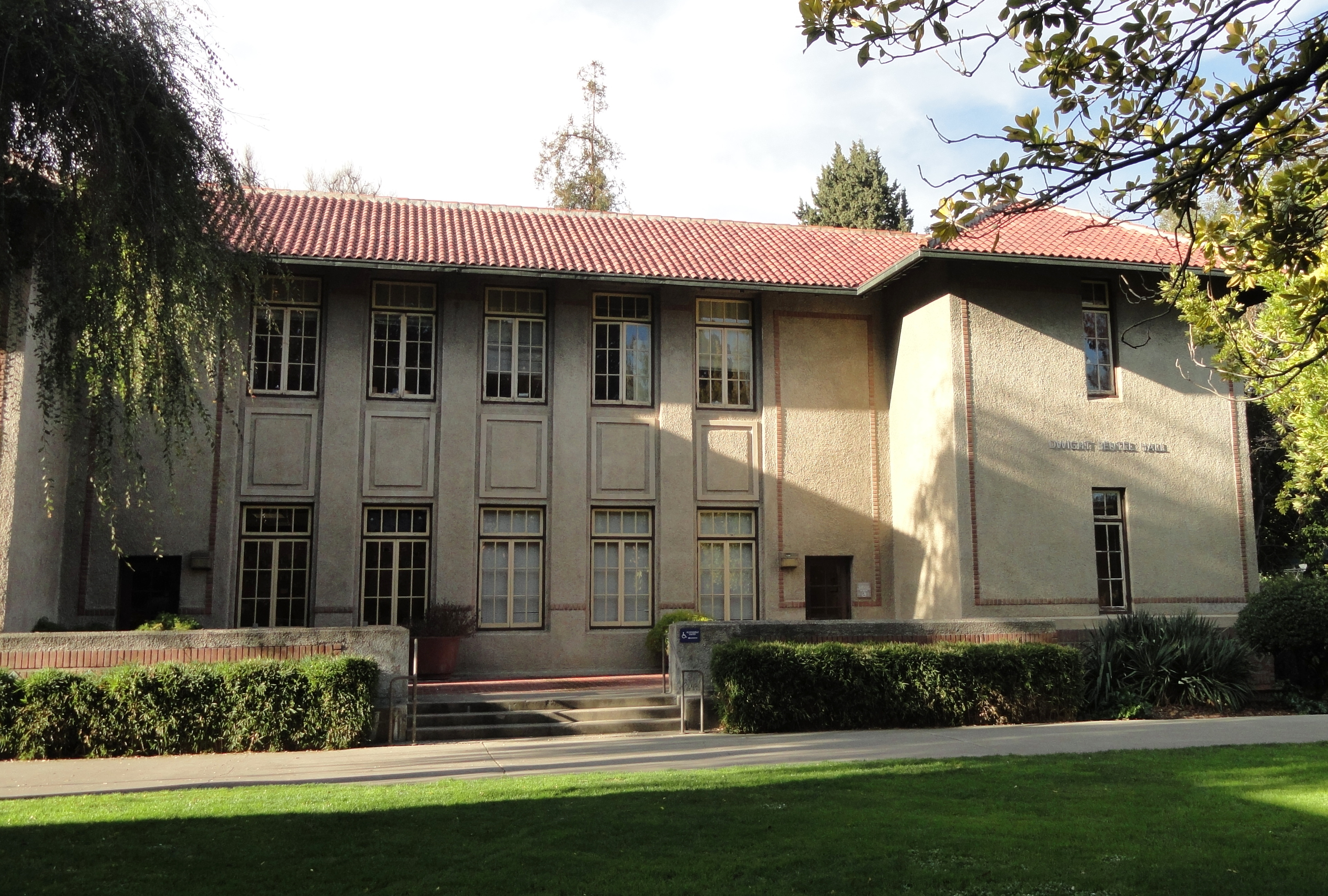
- Dwight Bentel Hall, School of Journalism at San Jose State University
- Type: Student Newspaper
- Format: Broadsheet
- School: San José State University
- Founder: Dwight Bentel
- Founded: 1934; 92 years ago
- Language: English
- Headquarters: San Jose, California
- Circulation: 6,000
- Website: https://sjsunews.com/
- Free online archives: https://scholarworks.sjsu.edu/spartan_daily/

The Spartan Daily is a not-for-profit, independent student newspaper serving San José State University and the surrounding Bay Area in San Jose, California.

As of 2023, The Spartan Daily publishes in print three times a week, and online daily when the university is in session (excluding holidays). It serves a student population of over 35,000 and a faculty and staff population of over 3,000. It is named for the university's mascot, the Spartan.

== History ==
The first student newspaper at San Jose State was The Normal Times, which was a weekly paper published from October 1909 through June 1920. In September 1921 the student newspaper relaunched under the name The College Times though it soon changed its name to the State Teachers College Times in November 1921. This name would remain through the 1925–1926 academic year, before being changed to the State College Times before the start of the 1926–1927 academic year.

Desiring to transition from a weekly paper to a daily paper, students, under the guidance of Dwight Bentel, launched The Spartan Daily in April 1934. For Bentel's help in creating the paper, as well as his contributions to founding the School of Journalism and Mass Communications at San Jose State, the building which both houses the school and headquarters The Spartan Daily was named in his honor in 1982.

== Publications ==
The Spartan Daily also has separate publications on specialized topics, these include:

- The Spear, which provides coverage of the campus' athletic and club sports programs.
- Update News, which is a weekly, student-produced television newscast that airs every weekend on KICU, Channel 36 in San Jose. The newscast is produced by San Jose State broadcast journalism students, and has aired in the Bay Area since 1982. The newscast previously aired on educational station KTEH. Update News also features a daily live webcast.
- Equal Time is a news magazine show produced by the San Jose State School of Journalism and Mass Communications. Each half-hour episode examines a different issue in depth, and ends with a roundtable discussion featuring professors and other experts in search of solutions. Equal Time airs Saturday afternoons on KQED+ (Channel 54 or Comcast Channel 10) in the Bay Area.

== Awards and notable alumni ==
Since 2015, The Spartan Daily has won 30 national journalism awards and 120 state awards. As of 2023, eight San Jose State journalist alumni have won Pulitzer Prizes, including:

- Steve Starr (1970)
- Kim Komenich (1987)
- Anacleto Rapping (1996)
- David Willman (2001)
- Marcio Sanchez (2021)
