= Zoë Marieh Urness =

Native American photographer

Zoë Marieh Urness (born 1984) is a photographer of Alaskan Tlingit and Cherokee Native American heritage. She creates portraits of modern Indigenous cultures in traditional regalia and settings.

== Early life and education ==
Urness was born in Washington, adopted at the age of four and raised by her great-great uncle and aunt. Her guardians fostered her education in tribal arts and history with the Alaskan Native Cultural Heritage Association in Seattle from kindergarten through high school graduation, ensuring that her Indigenous education was an integral part of her upbringing. While her non-native schoolmates had soccer practices on school nights and games on the weekends, she and her twin sister gathered with other Tlingit youth and elders to don their traditional regalia, learn, practice and share their traditional songs and dances. With her tribe, she traveled the state of Washington, the United States, and Europe performing and sharing their stories as a cultural ambassador. The experience left a lasting impression that would later become the foundation of her photographic work.

At the age of seven, Urness received her first camera from her grandmother. Photography became her passion and professional pursuit. She attended college and earned art degrees from Skagit Valley College in Mount Vernon, Washington and the Brooks Institute of Photography in Santa Barbara, California.

== Early career ==
After college graduation in 2008, she initially intended to become a magazine photographer and began freelancing in Santa Barbara and Seattle, shooting for Outside and Trend magazines.

In her early career, she began studying the work of Edward S. Curtis, a renowned documentary photographer of European descent whose mission was to document Indigenous peoples as a 'vanishing race'. His black-and-white and sepia toned portraits of Native subjects in their traditional regalia comprise some of the earliest and most revered photographic records of Native Americans in existence. Urness saw herself and her own tribal members in Curtis' images, and dedicated herself to capturing and telling the visual narrative of current Native peoples and cultures.

In 2014, she launched a Kickstarter campaign for her first photo project, 'Native Americans: Keeping the Traditions Alive', intended to "emphasize critically endangered languages captured with video and still imagery." In this project she photographed tribes across the US, including visits to the Havasupai at the bottom of the Grand Canyon, the Hopi at Second Mesa, the Apache Crown Dancers at Monument Valley, and Alaskan natives at the Biennial Celebrations in Juneau. Urness became interested in documenting and exploring the nuances of each tribe's expression of their culture and traditions in connection to their ancestral landscape and habitat.

== Career honors and accomplishments ==
Urness has shown her work in international and domestic US art exhibitions, been published in major media publications, had her work acquired by museums, hung her work in galleries in the US and overseas, and participated in many Native art shows and markets.

Her greatest honors in the art market circuit include showing her Alaskan work at the Indigenous Fine Art Market and Santa Fe Indian Market for many seasons, winning Best in Division and Best in Category at Santa Fe Indian Market for multiple years, and being recognized by the California-based Autry Museum of the American West, the Art Basel fair in Miami, the Native Treasures Indian Arts Festival, and the Heard Museum Guild Indian Fair and Market in Arizona.

In the gallery and museum sector she has shown at Photo L.A. SPECTRUM and several other galleries in New Mexico, Arizona and the UK, including the ZOHI Gallery in Santa Fe, NM (which she co-owned). Her print "December 5th, 2016: No Spiritual Surrender" was acquired by two museums, the Autry Museum of the American West, and the Birmingham Museum of Art. She has also been in six national and international traveling exhibitions at various galleries and venues in Russia, Washington, D.C., California, Tennessee, Minnesota, New Mexico, Georgia, Arizona, Oklahoma and more from 2017 to 2020. A group of her photographs is a part of the Tia Collection in Santa Fe, New Mexico.

Her photograph "Dec. 5, 2016: No Spiritual Surrender", at the Oceti Sakowin Camp on Standing Rock Sioux Reservation at the Dakota Access Pipeline Protests, was nominated for a Pulitzer Prize in Feature Photography by World Literature Today, and appeared on the cover of the magazine's May 2017 issue, "New Native Writing: From Wounded Knee to Standing Rock". She also received awards from the Autry Museum and SWAIA Santa Fe Indian Market between 2015 and 2017.

In March 2022, Urness received the Sony Alpha+ Female Grant for her "Indigenous Motherhood" project, and is currently in the process of producing this body of work.

== Personal life ==
Urness gave birth to her first child in winter 2021.

== Awards ==
- 2018: Pulitzer Prize Nomination, Feature Photography Cover of World Literature today May – August 2017
- 2017: Autry Museum of the American West, Best in Photography, 1st place
- 2016: SWAIA Santa Fe Indian Market, Best in Photography, 1st place
- 2016: Autry Museum of the American West, Acknowledgement
- 2015: SWAIA Santa Fe Indian Market, Best in Black and White Photography, 1st place

== Acquisitions ==
"Raven Tells his Story in the Fog"

- 2021: Tacoma Art Museum – Tacoma, Washington
- 2018: Western Spirit Scottsdale's Museum of the West – Scottsdale, Arizona
- 2017: Birmingham Museum of Art: Birmingham, Alabama

"December 5th, 2016: No Spiritual Surrender"

- 2018: Autry Museum of the American West, 40x32 Desaturated Metallic C-Print mounted to plexiglass Edition 1 of 1
- 2017: Birmingham Museum of Art, 50x40 Metallic C-Print mounted to plexiglass Edition 1 of 1

== Galleries ==
- 2018: Webster Collections – Santa Fe, New Mexico
- 2017 to present: Altamira Fine Art, Scottsdale, Arizona / Jackson Hole, Wyoming
- 2017: Zohi, Santa Fe, New Mexico
- 2016 to present: Mountain Trails Fine Art, Santa Fe, New Mexico
- 2015 to 2017: Rainmaker Gallery, Bristol, United Kingdom
- 2015: Manitou Galleries, Santa Fe, New Mexico

== Exhibitions ==
"Hearts of our People: Native American Women in the Arts", Traveling Group Exhibition produced by Minneapolis Institute of Art

- 2020 Fall: Renwick Gallery / Smithsonian Institution Washington DC
- 2020 Summer: Philbrook Museum of Art, Oklahoma
- 2020 Spring: Fowler Museum UCL A, California
- 2019- 2020 September to January: First Center of Visual Arts Nashville, Tennessee
- 2019 May to August: Minneapolis Institute of Art Minneapolis, Minnesota

"Borrowing the Earth", Russian Traveling Group Exhibition (10 images provided by artist)

- 2019 February to March: Orenburg Fine Arts Museum
- 2019 March to April: Ufa Fina Arts Museum
- 2019 May to June: Izhevsk
- 2019 July to August: Noviy Urengoy
- 2019 August to September: Noyabrsk
- 2019 September to October: South Urals History Museum in Chelyabinsk
- 2019 November to December: Tyumen Fine Arts Museum

"Beyond Standing Rock", Group Exhibition

- 2019 February to August: Santa Fe, New Mexico

"Zoe Urness: Keeping the Traditions Alive", Solo Exhibition

- 2017–2018 November to May: Booth Western Art Museum, Cartersville, Georgia

"Standing Rock: Art and Solidarity", Group Exhibition

- 2017–2018 May to February: Autry Museum of the American West, California

"Untitled", Joint show with Navajo Painter Tony Abeyta

- 2017 March: Altamira Fine Art, Scottsdale, Arizona

== Publications ==
- 2018 January: First American Art Magazine
- 2017 August/September: Native American Art
- 2017 August: Indian Country Today
- 2017 July 3: Santa Fe Reporter
- 2017 May: World Literature Today (cover)
- 2017: Native Peoples
- 2016: BLOUIN International Art Collector Magazine
- 2016: Western Art Collector
