= Tracy Trotter =

Tracy Trotter is a cinematographer. Trotter has over thirty-five years of experience as a director of photography and has won three Emmy Awards for his cinematography. Trotter also teaches cinematography at Brooks Institute in Ventura, California.
