= Photo L.A. =

Annual photography event

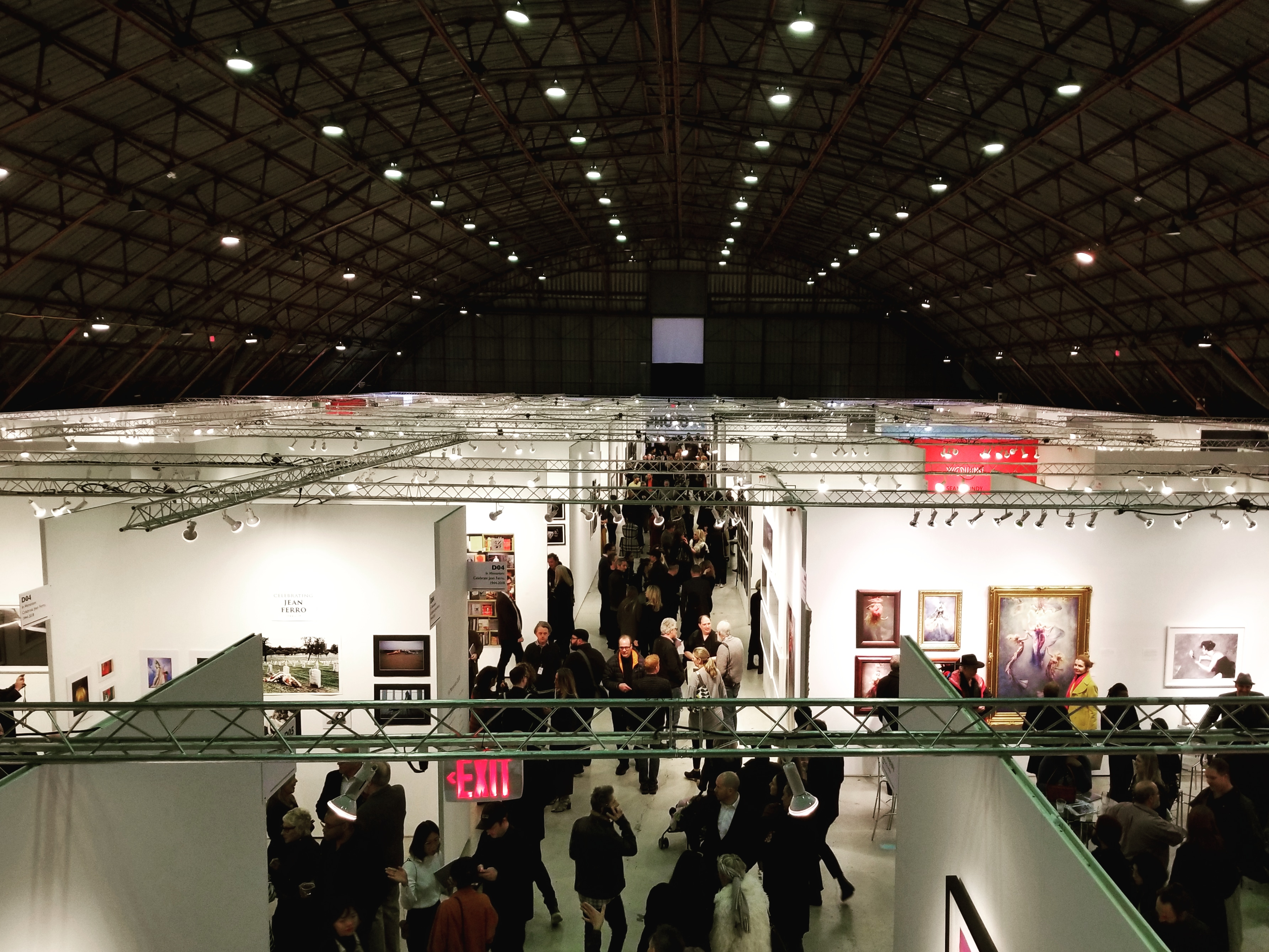
Photo L.A. at the Barker Hangar

Photo L.A. is an international art photography fair held annually in Los Angeles. The fair was established in 1992 and is visited by between ten and eighteen thousand attendees annually.

== History ==
Photo L.A. was founded in 1992 by photography dealer and gallerist Stephen Cohen. It was initially officially called the Los Angeles International Photographic Print Exposition. The first edition (1991) was a table-top exposition at Butterfield & Butterfield auction house on Sunset Boulevard in Los Angeles, California. In 2011, Photo L.A. joined artLA Projects, a citywide program of art installations, exhibitions, seminars, and conversations at the Santa Monica Civic Auditorium. In 2014, it moved to The LA Mart building in Downtown Los Angeles.

In 2018, Claudia James Bartlett became owner and director of Photo L.A. In 2019, Photo L.A. moved to the Barker Hangar, Santa Monica. The hangar's 35,000 square foot space hosted 60+ galleries, collectives, non-profit organizations, art schools, and booksellers from China, France, the Netherlands, Switzerland, Hungary, Peru, and more. The opening night honored LA-based artist Jo Ann Callis and benefitted Venice Arts.

In response to the COVID-19 pandemic during June 2020, Photo L.A. hosted its first art photography virtual fair with virtual installation showcases presented by the J. Paul Getty Museum and the Philadelphia Museum of Art.

== Description ==
Photo L.A. hosts a content series during each fair, with lectures, panel discussions, and docent tours led by professionals in photography.

== Past honorees ==
- Weston Naef,
- James Welling,
- Catherine Opie,
- Jo Ann Callis,
- Anthony Hernandez
