= Paul F. Ryan =

American film producer and director

Paul F. Ryan is an American film producer, director, and teacher. He is best known for writing, directing and producing the 1998 short film The List, and the 2002 independent film Home Room.

== Early life ==
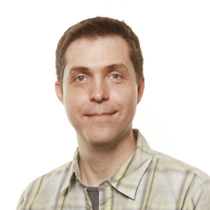
Paul F. Ryan, Brooks Institute

Paul F. Ryan attended Texas A&M University in 1992, for a BA in marketing. He earned his MA in Cinema/Television at University of Southern California in 1998. After graduating from school, Paul started to work on being a director, producer, and film editor. Since the 1990s, he has worked on featured independent films and founded MOR Entertainment, which is located in Manhattan Beach, California, where he began his film career. In the last decade or so, MOR Entertainment has worked with many film production companies such as Miramar Films, The Weinstein Company, Rogue Pictures, Dimension Films, and Paramount Digital Entertainment, and well-known corporate companies such as Anheuser-Busch, Pepsi, and Myspace.

== Career ==
=== Home Room ===
In 2003, Ryan wrote and directed a drama award-winning independent film called Home Room. Home Room is a 133-minute feature debut and was released on September 5, 2003. The film is about two teenagers dealing with a post-Columbine experience. Home Room focuses more on the physiological side of events throughout the film. The two teenage girls in the movie, Deanna (Erika Christensen) and Alicia (Busy Philipps), are troubled after the high school massacre. Deanna, described by Holden as “perky and so habitually upbeat,” suffers a head injury from the shooting, and Alicia, “dresses like a punk goth,” is ordered by the principal (James Pickens Jr.) to visit Deanna in the hospital. While that happens, police detectives investigate whether Alicia was involved in the shooting, due to claims of her standing next to the shooters before attacking. The film explores the depth of both teenage girls and focuses on the friendship they develop throughout the movie. The movie received mixed reviews from critics. Steven Holden, film and music critic for The New York Times, said that the film is “sluggishly paced and refuses to lighten up for even a second,” but continued to state that “as the police story plods along, it eventually seems like a structural contrivance. You come away from the movie not only caring about both girls, but believing that the bond they develop is genuine.” LA Times Staff Writer, Kevin Crust, stated, “With an unconscionably long running time of 2 hours and 11 minutes for what is essentially a two-hander between Philipps and Christensen, 'Home Room' feels like detention—without the possibility of recess.”

=== Films ===
- Home Room
- Eye of the Storm
- The List
- Mascots
- The Dirt
- The Lovebirds

== Personal life ==
Ryan worked in a handful of award-winning independent films. He took part in the project Eye of the Storm, which received the Harold Lloyd Scholarship for Film Editing. He did a thesis film called The List, which was rewarded first place drama at the College Emmy Awards. He was a production manager for several films including Mascots (2016), The Dirt (2019), and The Lovebirds (2020).

Ryan was a lecturer at Loyola Marymount University and Chapman University in film courses and taught classes on directing, producing, and film editing at the now-defunct Brooks Institute.
