= Douglas Bizzaro and Elizabeth Moss =

American photography and filmmaking duo

Douglas Bizzaro
- Born: New York City, New York, U.S.
- Occupation(s): Photographer, film director

Elizabeth Moss
- Born: Nashville, Tennessee, U.S.
- Occupation(s): Photographer, film director, model

Douglas Bizzaro and Elizabeth Moss are American photographers and film directors working in the fields of fashion, advertising, and fine art.

== Career ==
=== Douglas Bizzaro ===
Bizzaro was raised in New York City and started taking pictures at age 12. He attended the Brooks Institute of Photography where he received a bachelor's degree. He then returned to New York, shooting for designers such as Jean Paul Gaultier and Chrome Hearts.

=== Elizabeth Moss ===
Moss was born in Nashville, Tennessee. She got her start in the industry as a model at age 13, living in Europe and Japan. She moved to New York at age 17 and soon after began working as an Art Director and Digital retouching artist. By age 20 her clients included Vogue Italia, W, and Yves Saint Laurent. She was featured in the documentary Body Image directed by two time Academy Award winning director Barbara Kopple, where she demonstrated her retouching works.

=== Joint career ===
Bizzaro and Moss have been collaborating since 1999. In the beginning of their career together they found most of their success in the fine art field, receiving awards for their black and white gallery prints. As their style progressed, they moved into more commercial assignments with print campaigns for The Ritz Carlton, Rampage, and Three Olives Vodka as well as television commercials for clients such as Ford Motors. They are noted for being on the forefront of high-end digital imaging. They worked directly with the Leaf Medium Format Photography company in developing its digital camera back. They have photographed celebrities including Madonna, Cher, and Drew Barrymore. Bizzaro and Moss were the first featured photographer guests on the reality television series America's Next Top Model in 2003. Their 2006 gallery exhibition "RIO" was critically acclaimed and showed a different side of the duo.

== Rare Digital Art ==
In 2006 Bizzaro and Moss founded Rare Digital Art, a postproduction house specializing in high end digital retouching. Their clients include Vogue, Grey Global Group, David LaChapelle, Vanity Fair, Elle, GQ, Skyy Vodka, and The New York Times.

== Books ==
"The World's Greatest Black & White Photography No.1" (contributors) ISBN 978-0-9557837-0-8

== Personal life ==
Bizzaro and Moss were married in October 2005 in Brazil. They live together in New York City.
