= Barbara Bekins =

Research hydrologist

Barbara A. Bekins
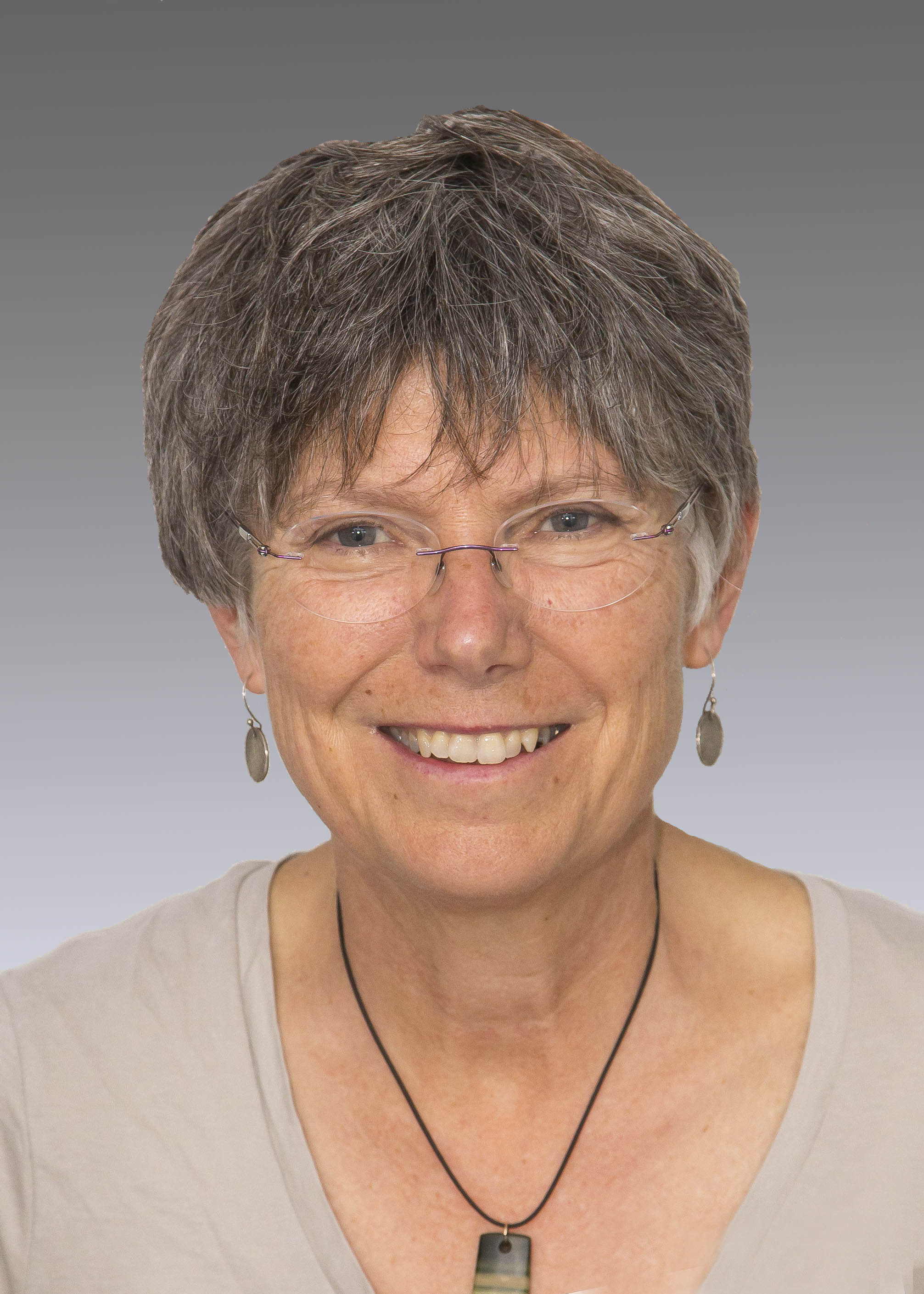
- Bekins profile photograph at the USGS in 2017
- Education: University of California, Santa Cruz (PhD); San Jose State University (MS); University of California, Los Angeles (BSc)
- Scientific career
- Workplaces: United States Geological Survey; Stanford University
- Thesis: A simplified analysis of parameters controlling dewatering in accretionary prisms (1993)

Barbara A. Bekins is a research hydrologist at the United States Geological Survey. She studies the environmental impact of a crude oil spill near Bemidji, Minnesota. She was elected a member of the National Academy of Engineering in 2020 for contributions to characterizing subsurface microbial populations related to contaminant degradation.

== Early life and education ==
Bekins studied mathematics at the University of California, Los Angeles, and graduated summa cum laude in 1975. She moved to San José State University for her master's studies, before moving to the University of California, Santa Cruz. Her doctoral research, under the supervision of Shirley J. Dreiss, used numerical modelling to understand accretionary prisms and the degradation of phenols in groundwater. She was appointed as a United States Environmental Protection Agency (EPA) postdoctoral research associate to measure the biodegradation of groundwater contaminants.

== Research and career ==
In 1997 Bekins joined the staff at the United States Geological Survey, where she combines field research with computer models to understand the geology of North America. In 1998 Bekins was appointed to the National Research Council Intrinsic Remediation committee, with whom she wrote the book Natural Attenuation for Groundwater Remediation.

She studies the attenuation of petroleum hydrocarbons and the effects of fluids on boundary faults. To investigate these, Bekins served as the onboard scientist for several Ocean Drilling Program vessels, including trips to Lesser Antilles, the Peru margin and the Mariana Convergent margin. Her research has evaluated the attenuation of source zone and groundwater plume as a result of the Bemidji oil spill. After the rupture of a high-pressure oil pipe in 1979, the United States Geological Survey established a crude oil research site in an effort to understand the natural attenuation of hydrocarbons. A combination of fermentation and methanogenesis is the main Natural Source Zone Depletion process (NSZD). NSZDs describe the change in composition of oil or fuel that occurs naturally due to volatilisation, biodegradation or dissolution. The majority of the carbon dioxide, which is primarily produced by the oxidation of methane, that leaves the surface does so as CO_{2} efflux. By monitoring the groundwater plume, Bekins has shown that the degradation of benzene is coupled to the reduction of iron. She has monitored a hydrocarbon plume through measurements of the non-volatile dissolved carbon, and showed that over the course of twenty years it expanded by 20 m. Whilst most of this carbon has degraded around 200 m from the source, some remains up to 300 m away.

=== Awards and honours ===
Her awards and honours include:

- 2004 Elected a Fellow of the Geological Society of America
- 2019 Elected a Fellow of the American Geophysical Union
- 2020 Elected a Member of the National Academy of Engineering

=== Selected publications ===
Her publications include:

- Distributions of microbial activities in deep subseafloor sediments (DOI: 10.1126/science.1101155)
- Sharp increase in central Oklahoma seismicity since 2008 induced by massive wastewater injection (DOI: 10.1126/science.1255802)
- A comparison of zero-order, first-order, and monod biotransformation models (DOI: 10.1111/j.1745-6584.1998.tb01091.x)
