= Devyn Galindo =

American photographer

- Born: Orange, California, U.S.
- Education: Brooks Institute
- Occupations: Photographer, artist, filmmaker

Devyn Galindo is an American two-spirit photographer, artist and filmmaker. Galindo uses the pronouns they/their. Their multidisciplinary practice includes filmmaking, photography, installation, and sculpture, addressing themes of pre-colonial gender systems and the reclamation of ancestral knowledge across the Latine diaspora.

== Biography ==
Devyn Galindo was born in Orange, California, and has lived throughout the American south and midwest. Their family roots span the southwest United States from Texas to California. Galindo began experimenting with film photography at the age of 13. Galindo identifies as two-spirit, and is nonbinary which uses the pronouns they/their.

Galindo received a bachelor's degree in photography in 2009 from the Brooks Institute located in Ventura, California.

Influenced by previous movements of the 1960s and 1970s, they seek to hold space for contemporary narratives of queer people of color and the LGBTQIA+ community. Inspirations for Galindo include photographers Laura Aguilar and Catherine Opie. Galindo's work has been featured in Vogue showcasing portraits of the Los Angeles Pride Parade in 2018.

=== Lost Bois ===
Lost Bois is a short film, directed by Galindo, that explores the themes of self-indulgence, desire and transmasculine brotherhood. The three protagonists of this film, Samp, Gian, and Tyler are transgender individuals, who share their life experiences while living in New York City. Galindo was inspired by the classic films Stand By Me, The Outsiders and Lost Boys. Lost Bois closely resonates with the themes of queer youth rebellion present in these films creating a utopian society where members of the LBTQIA+ community can live freely on their own conditions. This notion is meant for Galindo to present a world where traditional values are no longer accepted. The film premiered at the Tribeca Film Festival in 2024.

=== Van Dykes Project ===
The Van Dykes Project is an ongoing project started by Galindo, working alongside writer Hope Steinman-Iacullo, that is in part a photo journalism project and part queer camp organization. Inspired by the story of the Van Dykes, who were a group of lesbians traveling through the United States and Mexico by bus, Galindo acquired a 1978 green Westfalia Vanagon, which they named Sweetpea, and embarked on a three-month road trip from California to the Pacific Northwest. During the three month road trip, Galindo and Steinman-Iacullo interviewed queer people and photographed them, with their consent, as a way of documenting their journey. With the assistance of queer designer Cherish Chang, this roadtrip resulted in the publication of two volumes of travelogue journals documenting the trip and the people Galindo met along the way.

=== We are Still Here ===
We Are Still Here is a photobook created by Galindo in 2017, which captures the effect on Los Angeles based upon the Chicanx and other indigenous resistance movements that have occurred in the past. The photobook serves to rebel against the colonialist white-American perspectives, which have marginalized the Mexican-American communities for decades. Overall, Galindo created this book to preserve the Chicanx culture and fight for the expansion of their identity and pride.

== Notable work ==
- We Are Still Here (2017), debut artist book featuring xicanx individuals in Los Angeles, California.
- BUTCH BALLET (2017), collaboration project with playwright and director Gina Young that is a compilation of portraits featuring a "butch" (including nonbinary and transmasculine) representation of ballet.
- Van Dykes Project: Vol. I; Vol. II, photo-journals documenting a queer road trip through the pacific northwest

== Exhibitions ==
- A Universal History of Infamy: Those of This America, exhibition at LACMA's satellite gallery at Charles White Elementary School

== Publications ==
- Galindo, Devyn (2017). We Are Still Here (artist book). D. Galindo.
- Galindo, Devyn (2026). God in Drag (artist book). D. Galindo.
- Van Dykes Journal: Vol. I by Devyn Galindo
- Van Dykes Journal: Vol. II by Devyn Galindo
