= Matt Revolter =

American film producer and photographer (born 1984)

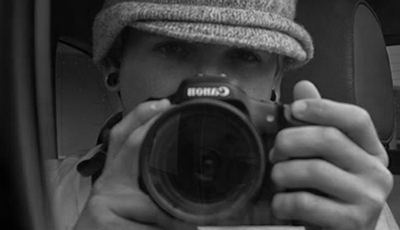
- Revolter in the self-portrait Impression
- Born: Matthew Pappas; November 6, 1984 (age 41); Santa Barbara, California, United States
- Education: Brooks Institute
- Occupations: Gunsmith, machinist, film producer, film director, cinematographer, photographer
- Years active: 2006–present
- Website: www.mattrevolter.com

Matt Revolter is an American film producer and photographer who is best known for producing music videos, short films, and fine art.

== Biography ==
=== Early life ===
Revolter was born and raised in Santa Barbara, California. He started as a graffiti artist and graphic designer before receiving a formal education in media production. He began his professional career working as an illustrator creating original works for corporate advertising, fashion companies, and musicians. During this time he also ran a successful marketing firm in Los Angeles, and has had success working as a commercial artist and marketer.

His work often deals with such themes as identity, empathy, and death. When he was ten years old his neighbor was attacked and killed by a great white shark. Tragic life experiences have given him creative inspiration.

Revolter has an extensive collection of vintage cameras, and has a preference to acquire items that often have connections to famous filmmakers or movies.

=== Education ===
Revolter graduated summa cum laude from Brooks Institute, where he received a Master of Fine Arts in Photography, Bachelor of Fine Arts in Film, and a Certificate in Cinematography.

=== Style ===
Revolter is known for creating empathetic and dark imagery set in high-concept settings. He claims to be "format agnostic" as he typically shoots with Red Digital Cinema Camera Company, Arri Alexa, Hasselblad, Phase One, Leica Camera, and Canon Inc. camera systems. He has incorporated principles derived from traditional cinema while shooting, which includes using film equipment and lighting techniques. Most of his scenes include real subjects in authentic locations, and he uses very little digital post-processing afterwards. Revolter's photographs are usually projected in large spaces, as opposed to being displayed in frames.

== Career ==
=== Producer ===
In 2014 Revolter produced a winning short film titled The Way We Were, directed by Ayasylla Ghosn, for the Santa Barbara Film Festival's 10-10-10 Student Filmmaking Competition. He also produced Schoolboy Q's music video for "Hoover Street" that same year. In 2013 he produced the music video for Cali Swag District's "Shake Something".

=== Photographer ===
In 2015 Revolter installed a multimedia projection titled "Bodies on the Wall" on various buildings throughout California. The project was part of his graduating thesis and questioned how viewers analyzed, participated, and remembered their experiences regarding artwork in the digital age.

In 2014 Revolter's photography was installed on the Studio Wall at Brooks Institute. The images he displayed questioned the viewers' understanding of both the meaning, and the relationship between the photographs.

=== Firearm Manufacturer ===
In 2018 Revolter started manufacturing firearms under the name Revolt Arms in Santa Barbara, CA.

== Filmography/exhibits ==
Notable work Revolter has produced include:

=== Short films ===
Year	Title	Role
2014	The Way We Were	Producer
2013	The Visitation	Producer, production manager
2013	Finale	Producer
2013	The BURB$	Executive producer
2012	CHUCK'D	Director, writer, editor

=== Music videos ===
Year	Artist	Song title	Role
2014	Kembe X	"As I Unfold"	Producer
2014	Schoolboy Q	"Hoover Street"	Producer
2014	Cali Swag District	"Pill Head"	Producer
2014	Cali Swag District	"Love Drug"	Producer
2013	Cali Swag District	"Shake Somethin"	Producer

=== Exhibitions ===
Year	Title	Gallery	City	Type	Type
2016	Deceptive Thoughts	Ethos Gallery	Santorini, Greece	Solo	Installation (digital motion still projection)
2015	Bodies on the Wall	Gallery 27 (Second Nature)	Santa Barbara, California	Group	Installation (digital motion still projection)
2015	Snap and Reframe	Brooks Institute	Ventura, California	Group	Photography
2014	Convergence of Thought	Venice Art Wall	Venice Beach, California	Solo	Photographic paint installation
2014	Projected Dreams	Ethos Gallery (Projected Dreams)	Santorini, Greece	Solo	Installation (digital motion still projection)
2014	Third Effect	Brooks Institute (Studio Wall Project)	Santa Barbara, California	Group	Photography
2012	Intangible Assets	Stage C (Intangible Assets)	Ventura, California	Solo	Installation (digital motion still projection)
2010	Photosynthesis	The Estate	Los Angeles, California	Solo	Installation (digital motion still projection)
