= Home Room (2002 film) =

Film by Paul F. Ryan

- DVD cover
- Directed by: Paul F. Ryan
- Written by: Paul F. Ryan
- Produced by: Benjamin Ormand
- Starring: Busy Philipps; Erika Christensen; Ken Jenkins; Raphael Sbarge; James Pickens Jr.; Roxanne Hart; Richard Gilliland; Agnes Bruckner; Arthur Taxier; Constance Zimmer; Holland Taylor; Victor Garber
- Cinematography: Rebecca Baehler
- Edited by: Paul F. Ryan
- Music by: Michael Shapiro
- Distributed by: DEJ Productions
- Release dates: April 12, 2002 (Taos Talking Pictures Film Festival); September 5, 2003 (United States)
- Running time: 132 minutes
- Country: United States
- Language: English
- Budget: <$500,000
- Box office: $5,216

Home Room is an independent film written and directed by Paul F. Ryan, and starring Busy Philipps, Erika Christensen, Holland Taylor and Victor Garber. It premiered at the Taos Talking Pictures Film Festival on April 12, 2002, before being given a limited theatrical release on September 5, 2003.

== Plot ==
A school shooting leaves seven students and the shooter's parents dead and one student named Deanna Cartwright seriously injured. The shooter himself is dead, shot by police during the confrontation after the actual shooting, and the only witness (and possible suspect) is Alicia Browning, a goth student who is now under the attention of the detective in charge of the case, Det. Martin Van Zandt.

The school principal asks Alicia to visit Deanna in the hospital. Right away, their differences are evident. Alicia is an outsider from a single-parent family who shuns the society that similarly shuns her, while Deanna is from a wealthy family, gets good grades and is popular with her classmates.

At first, Deanna seems upbeat and cheerful, but soon it becomes apparent that beneath this exterior are psychological scars left behind by the incident. Alicia starts to empathize with her, as she herself is battling her own demons as well, including a previous suicide attempt. Through these similar emotional bonds, the two form an unlikely friendship as they both try to cope with their separate psychological problems.

== Cast ==
- Busy Philipps as Alicia
- Erika Christensen as Deanna
- Victor Garber as Det. Martin Van Zandt
- Raphael Sbarge as Det. Macready
- Ken Jenkins as Police Captain
- Holland Taylor as Dr. Hollander
- Arthur Taxier as Mr. Browning
- James Pickens Jr. as Principal Robbins
- Constance Zimmer as Assistant Kelly
- Richard Gilliland as Mr. Cartwright
- Roxanne Hart as Mrs. Cartwright
- Agnes Bruckner as Cathy

== Home Room and Columbine ==
Even though he started writing the script before the event, director Paul F. Ryan later based the film on the Columbine High School massacre; the film was released only three years after the incident. Ryan and Christensen visited Columbine High School before the film's release to speak to students, faculty and parents, who received a private screening of the film. The response was generally positive and Ryan has since returned as a guest of the school twice.

While a large part of the public wishes to figure out why such massacres happen, some have lauded Home Room simply for not explaining why they happen; the film does not place blame on violent video games or films, and concludes that finding a single reason for these events is impossible.

In addition, the film focuses on what happens to the community long after the news crews have left. In an interview, Ryan explains, "What changed my mind was watching what happened in Littleton afterwards. CNN reported the story for about two weeks, then left. The rest of America moved on, but the people in Littleton didn't. How do you start living your life again after such a terrible thing?"

== Reception ==
=== Box office ===
In the United States, Home Room had an opening weekend of $3,467 from three theaters. By the end of its run, it grossed a total of $5,216.

=== Critical response ===
On review aggregator website Rotten Tomatoes, the film holds an approval rating of 55%, based on 22 reviews, with an average rating of 5.6/10. The site's critics consensus reads "Honorable intentions and some strong performances aren't enough to keep Home Room from occasionally slipping into distractingly didactic messaging". On Metacritic, the film holds 43 out of a 100 based on 10 reviews, indicating "mixed or average" reviews.
