= Roy Hirabayashi =

American Taiko musician and composer

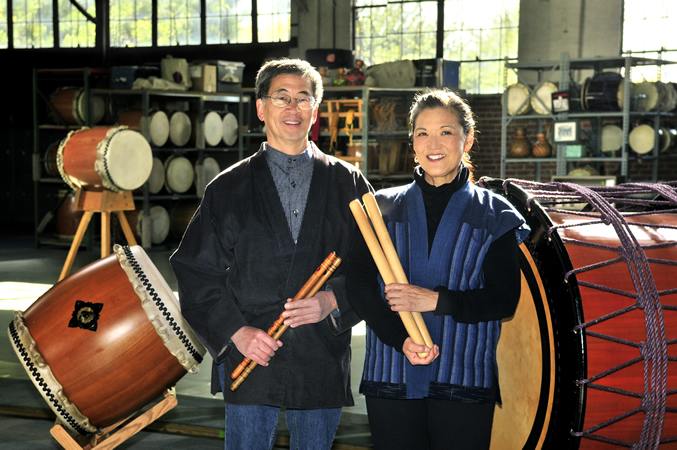
- Roy (left) and PJ Hirabayashi in 2011
- Born: 1951 (age 74–75); Berkeley, California, U.S.
- Occupations: Musician, composer
- Spouse: PJ Hirabayashi

Roy Mitsuru Hirabayashi (Japanese: 平林 満, born 1951) is a Japanese American composer, performer, teacher and community leader known for co-founding San Jose Taiko and his work supporting the San Jose Japan Town Community.

He, alongside his artistic partner and wife, PJ Hirabayashi, were awarded the National Heritage Fellowship in 2011 by the National Endowment for the Arts, the United States' highest honor in the folk and traditional arts.

== Early life ==
Roy Hirabayashi was born in 1951 in Berkeley, California. His parents, although born in the United States, were raised and educated in Japan. Hirabayashi, however, grew up in Oakland California and was active in the Oakland Buddhist Temple.

In 1961 he attended San Jose State University, initially to pursue engineering, but ultimately studied a combination of Psychology and Philosophy. Hirabayashi was also involved with the creation and continuation of the Asian American Studies minor at San Jose State University.

== Career ==
After graduating from San Jose State University, Hirabayashi was hired by the San Jose Betsuin as a youth activity program coordinator. At the time, Revered Hiroshi Abiko wanted to encourage the younger generation to be more involved with the church. Having seen Kinnara Taiko in Los Angeles, Reverend Abiko recruited Hirabayashi and Dean Miyakusu (a classmate of Hirabayashi from San Jose State University) to fundraise money to start a taiko group. With the money they gathered, they visited Kinnara Taiko, where Reverend Mas Kodani, founder of Kinnara Taiko, taught them how to build drums out of wine barrels. They brought materials back and built their first drums, and began to hold open practices after Sunday church services open to all. They gave their first performance in October 1973, making San Jose Taiko the third taiko group to form in North America.

The following year, Hirabayashi and the core San Jose Taiko members were invited to study under Seiichi Tanaka in 1974 at San Francisco Taiko Dojo. After studying with Tanaka for a year, Hirabayashi departed and focused on developing San Jose Taiko's unique style and sound, specifically centering it around the Japanese American, or Nikkei, identity and experience.

Hirabayashi also toured with Kodo during their 1982 US and Japan tour as a stage manager. It was after this experience that Hirabayashi pushed for San Jose Taiko to develop a professional level of performance and become more concert oriented.

Hirabayashi was San Jose Taiko's Executive Director from its founding in 1973 to his departure in 2011. During his time with the group, he also served as a workshop instructor, performer, and composer.

== Community Work ==
Hirabayashi has been part of various boards and committees, and continues to serve the San Jose and greater Californian community. He is currently a part of

- American Leadership Forum Silicon Valley, Senior Fellow
- Japantown Community Congress of San Jose, Board Member (former President, 2011)
- Asian Pacific American Leadership Institute, Senior Fellow
- California Japanese American Community Leadership Council board

== Awards ==
- Arts Council of Silicon Valley commendation for community leadership, 1994
- Preservation Action Council of San Jose, 2004
- Foreign Minister of Japan Commendation Award, 2010
- National Heritage Fellowship awarded by the National Endowment for the Arts, 2011
- The Japanese American of the Biennium Award by Japanese American Citizens League, 2014
- John W. Gardner Leadership Award by American Leadership Forum Silicon Valley, 2015
- Cornerstone of the Arts by San Jose Arts Commission and Office of Cultural Affairs, 2016
- San Jose Cornerstone Creative Impact Award for MALI by City of San Jose, 2021
- California Arts Council Legacy Artist Awardee, 2023.
