= Hassina Leelarathna =

Sri Lankan-American journalist (1948–2021)

- Born: June 22, 1948; Colombo
- Died: October 17, 2021 (aged 73); Sherman Oaks
- Spouse: Deeptha Leelarathna (died 2006)
- Children: 1

Hassina Leelarathna (June 22, 1948 – October 17, 2021) was a Sri Lankan-American journalist.

== Early life ==
Leelarathna was born in Colombo. She was raised in a Muslim family in Sri Lanka's Malay community.

In 1975, Leelarathna and her husband moved to the U.S., settling in the San Francisco Bay Area and then in Southern California. She earned a master's degree in English from San Jose State University.

== Career ==
In 1980, Leelarathna and her husband founded a newspaper, the Sri Lankan Express. The paper published bi-weekly in English, becoming an online newspaper in 2015. It covered issues such as the 2004 Indian Ocean earthquake and tsunami, the Sri Lankan Civil War and problems faced by new immigrants to the U.S.

Leelarathna also worked as a financial analyst for the Department of Veterans Affairs. She and her husband ran Tharanga, a radio program broadcast in Sinhala and English for the Sri Lankan community in Los Angeles.

== Personal life ==
Leelarathna was married to journalist Deeptha Leelarathna, whom she met at The Times of Ceylon. They have a son. Deeptha died in 2006.

Leelarathna died of lung cancer at Sherman Oaks on October 17, 2021.
