= Martha Stewart Weddings =

Online magazine

- Frequency: Quarterly
- Total circulation: 223,606 (2011) (2011)
- Founded: 1994
- Final issue: 2018 (print)
- Company: Dotdash Meredith
- Country: United States
- Based in: New York City
- Language: English
- Website: www.marthastewartweddings.com
- ISSN: 1534-553X

Martha Stewart Weddings is an online weddings magazine published by Martha Stewart Living Omnimedia. Martha Stewart Weddings was launched as an annual publication in 1994, and was expanded to quarterly in 1999. It was the second magazine title published by Martha Stewart Living Omnimedia, and was primarily distributed through newsstands.

In November 2014 the magazine was licensed to Meredith Corporation for ten-year period. In 2018, the magazine moved online-only.
