= Bob Gliner =

American film director (born c. 1940s)

Bob Gliner (born c. 1940s) is an independent documentary film director and emeritus Faculty of Sociology at San Jose State University. Gliner's work focuses on social change throughout the world and covers such topics as the challenges facing developing nations, school reform, consumerism, climate change, college athletics, the military–industrial complex and the disabled. Gliner's programs air on PBS stations nationwide. Gliner lives in the Santa Cruz Mountains in California.

== Awards ==
- 2008 Bronze Remi. WorldFest International Independent Film Festival. Democracy Left Behind.
- 2005 Cine Golden Eagle. Playing for Keeps
- 2005 Worldfest Gold Jury Special Award, Heifer
- 2004 Columbus International Film & Video Festival, Bronze Plaque, Education For What? Learning Social Responsibility
- 1994 Cine Golden Eagle, Vietnam: At the Crossroads
- 1989 National Educational Film & Video Festival, Silver Apple Award, Defending America: The Price We Pay
- 1989 National Educational Film & Video Festival, Golden Apple Award. Russia Off The Record
