= PJ Hirabayashi =

American taiko musician and composer

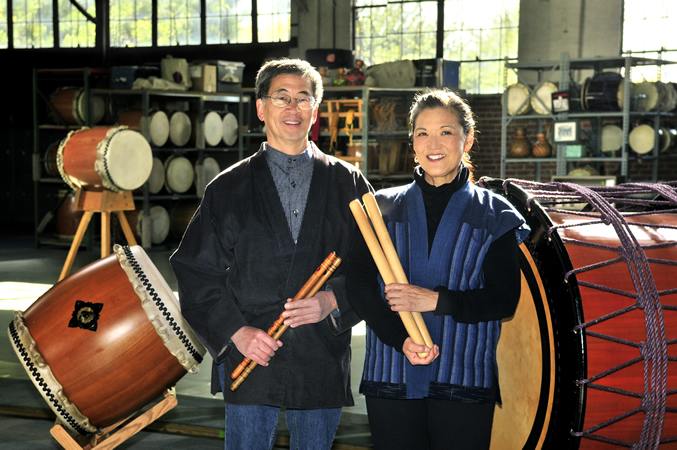
- Roy and PJ (right) Hirabayashi in 2011

Background information
- Born: May 18, 1950 (age 76); San Rafael, California, U.S.
- Genres: Taiko, Asian American traditional and folk music
- Occupations: Musician, composer
- Years active: 1973–present

Patti Jo "PJ" Hirabayashi (Japanese: 平林 嬢, born May 18, 1950) is one of the pioneers of the North American Taiko movement. She is the founder of TaikoPeace, President of Kodo Arts Sphere America (KASA), and co-founder of Creatives for Compassionate Communities-a grassroots art-ivist group originating in San Jose, California. She is also the Artistic Director Emeritus and charter member of San Jose Taiko, the third taiko group to form in the United States. Her signature composition, "Ei Ja Nai Ka", is a celebration of immigrant life expressed in taiko drumming, dance, and voice that continues to be performed around the world.

She and her husband Roy Hirabayashi are recipients of the 2011 National Heritage Fellowship awarded by the National Endowment for the Arts, which is the United States government's highest honor in the folk and traditional arts.

== Personal life ==
Hirabayashi was born on May 18, 1950, in San Rafael, California. She is a third-generation Japanese (Sansei) and was raised in the San Francisco Bay Area. As a child, Hirabayashi got involved in dance, studying styles such as tap, ballet, and acrobatics. She attended Irvington High School where she would study piano and guitar in addition to dance.

For college, she initially attended California State University, Hayward (CSU Hayward) where she majored in math for two years with the plan to become a computer analyst. Hirabayashi's years in college coincided with the Civil Rights Movement, which gained a lot of steam in colleges across the nation in terms of organized protest. While in college Hirabayashi began to become aware of the internment experience of WWII and of other injustices to people of color, and because of this she began to get involved in community activism and Asian American studies. She then transferred to University of California, Berkeley with a Social Science major (a combination of ethnic studies, sociology, and psychology) where she focused on Asian-American studies. After obtaining her degree in Social Science from Berkeley, she spent a year in Japan before returning to San Jose to obtain a master's degree in Urban and Regional Planning from San Jose State University in 1977. Her master's thesis is on the preservation of San Jose's Japantown, and has become a widely used reference for research and for community action committees currently discussing the preservation of San Jose Japantown. From 1977 to 1979, she served as Acting Coordinator for "Asian American Communities" classes and supervisor for students gaining fieldwork experience in Asian American service organizations.

She began to get involved in the early formations of San Jose Taiko in 1973 through Roy Hirabayashi whom she met in 1969 during her years at CSU Hayward. They would eventually get married and become the leaders of San Jose Taiko, he as the managing director and she as the artistic director.

== Taiko involvement ==
Hirabayashi had some exposure to taiko through Obon festivals growing up. However, she was finally struck by it during a performance by San Francisco Taiko Dojo through a cultural program featured through the Issei project she was involved with. In this performance she saw two women performing on equal level with the men and, "remembered thinking, that's fantastic to see women play such a powerful activity, [yet] still be connected to Japanese culture." After this, Hirabayashi had an interest to connect to her Japanese heritage through the art of taiko. When she returned to San Jose State in 1973 she was able to get involved with taiko because Roy Hirabayashi had just started San Jose Taiko. Even though Hirabayashi had never had any prior instruction of taiko before, under training from groups such as Ondekoza, Kodo, Warabi-za, and Oedo Sukeroku, Hirabayashi went on to become a leading taiko artist and teacher.

In 1987, San Jose Taiko was first invited to tour Japan through the group Ondekoza. Even though San Jose had at times been called illegitimate because of their break from traditional Japanese taiko and an embracing of a more fused sound combining Japanese rhythms with American and World influences, they were widely received by Japanese audiences. This inspired San Jose to become a more serious professional taiko group. In 1991, San Jose Taiko went on their first touring series across the United States to present the unique style of San Jose Taiko to parts of America that may not have had any exposure to the art form previously. Hirabayashi is a part of the touring group that tours both the US and internationally, presenting taiko to over 100,000 people per year.

Until July 2011, Hirabayashi was the artistic director of San Jose Taiko where she oversaw rehearsals, developed the training program and curriculum of San Jose Taiko, developed costumes, composed some of the repertoire, and facilitated the artistic development of the group. In addition to this, she also directed the performing company's workshops, master classes, and audition process.

Considered a pioneer of North American taiko, she is known in the international taiko community for her performance and teaching style.

== Collaborations and awards ==
=== Collaborations ===
Hirabayashi has participated in notable San Jose Taiko collaborations including George Coates Performance Works, American Conservatory Theater, Asian American Jazz Orchestra, San Jose Repertory Theater, Brenda Wong Aoki, Zakir Hussain, Kagemusha Taiko and Kodo. As a solo artist, she has performed with Hiroshima, David Benoit, San Jose Symphony, San Francisco Symphone, Ondekoza, Margaret Wingrove Dance Company, and Teatre Yugen.

=== Awards ===
- Pacific Asian Women's "Woman Warrior Award" in the Arts, 1987
- Women's Fund Award in the Arts, Santa Clara County, 1990
- Arts Council of Silicon Valley commendation for community leadership, 1994
- Preservation Action Council of San Jose, 2004
- Silicon Valley Arts and Business Awards' Arts Leadership Award, 2010
- Foreign Minister of Japan Commendation Award, 2010
- National Heritage Fellowship awarded by the National Endowment for the Arts, 2011
- Silicon Valley Creates Legacy Laureate, 2014
- National Japanese American Citizens League Japanese American of the Biennium Award, 2014

For her activism she has received the Asian Americans for Community Involvement's "Arts Community Star Award" (2003), the Silicon Valley Asian Pacific American Democratic Club's "Community Activist Award"(2005), and the Japanese American Citizens' League's "Community Recognition Award"(2007).

== Works ==
=== Compositions ===
- Hachijo/Noto (Co-written with Roy Hirabayashi) 1987
- Miyoshi no Ki (Co-written with Roy Hirabayashi) 1987
- Bamboo Drums (Co-written with Roy Hirabayashi) 1990
- Celebration (Co-written with Roy Hirabayashi) 1992
- Ei Ja Nai Ka? 1994
- Matsuri Gensokyoku (Co-written with Yumi Ishihara, Anna Lin & Jeremy Nishihara) 1995
- Fukai Tokoro Kara 1995
- Do-Kan 2001
- Tottemo Yoi (Co-written with Yumi Ishihara) 2002
- Ichigo Ichie (Co-written with Nobuko Miyamoto & Yoko Fujimoto) 2003
- Moving in Time (Co-written with Roy Hirabayashi) 2004

=== Recordings ===
- San Jose Taiko Group, Bamboo Brew Productions 1978
- San Jose Taiko "15th Anniversary Concert", Sokai Audio 1988
- San Jose Taiko, "Insight Through Sound", Sokai Audio 1991
- San Jose Taiko, "Kodama, Echoes of the Soul", SJT 1993
- San Jose Taiko, "Moichi Do - One More Time", SJT/Sokai Audio 1996
- Anthony Brown, "Family", Asian Improv 1996
- Asian American Jazz Orchestra, "Big Bands Behind Barbed Wire", Asian Improv 1998
- Mark Izu, "Last Dance", Asian Improv 1998
- "Rhythm Journey", San Jose Taiko 2005
- The Triangle Project: "Journey of the Dandelion", Bindu Records 2005
- "3-Decades", San Jose Taiko (DVD) 2008
