= Shirley J. Dreiss =

American scientist (1949–1993)

- Born: Shirley Jean Dreiss
- Died: December 14, 1993 (aged 43–44); California, US
- Awards: Birdsall Distinguished Lectureship
- Scientific career
- Fields: Hydrology; Hydrogeology
- Workplaces: University of California, Santa Cruz

Shirley Jean Dreiss (1949–1993) was an American scientist working in the fields of hydrology and hydrogeology. After gaining her PhD from Stanford University, she joined the faculty of the University of California, Santa Cruz, where she became Professor and Chair of the Department of Earth Sciences. At the time of her death in a car accident, she was studying the groundwater system of Mono Lake in California. She was awarded the Birdsall Distinguished Lectureship from the Geological Society of America, which was renamed the Birdsall-Dreiss Distinguished Lectureship after her death.

== Life ==
Shirley Dreiss was born in 1949. She died on December 14, 1993, at the age of 44, in a car accident.

== Education ==
Dreiss earned her Bachelor of Science degree in geology, from the University of Texas at Austin, and her master's degree from the University of Missouri, advised by Stan Davis. Dreiss gained her doctorate from Stanford University, where she worked with Irwin Remson and developed a new approach to describe water flow through karst aquifers. Remson described her as a "gifted scientist" who created "brilliant formulations" in her thesis.

== Career and research ==
Dreiss joined the faculty of the University of California, Santa Cruz in 1979. At the time of her death in 1993, she was professor and chair of the Department of Earth Sciences at UCSC.

Continuing the descriptions of karst water flow that she developed for her PhD, Dreiss expanded her work to regional-scale transport through karst.

Dreiss was a member of a National Academy of Sciences committee to study the Mono Lake ecosystem. At the time of her death, Dreiss was working on Mono Lake groundwater hydrology, and several papers were published after her death describing this work.

Dreiss undertook pioneering work on fluid flow in subduction zones, and seafloor sediments. She served on two panels for the international Ocean Drilling Program.

Dreiss was a member of the Coordinating Board of the California Water Resources Center, and a member of the National Academy of Sciences Committee to Review the EPA's Environmental Monitoring and Assessment Program.

== Awards and recognition ==
In 1991, Dreiss was awarded the prestigious Birdsall Distinguished Lectureship for the Hydrogeology Division of the Geological Society of America. Her lectures were titled "The Hydrogeology of an Active Subduction Zone" and "Regional Scale Transport in a Karst Aquifer." After her death, and through contributions by friends and colleagues, the lectureship was renamed as the Birdsall-Dreiss Lectureship.

A special section of the journal Water Resources Research was created in her honor.

Dreiss is profiled by the American Geophysical Union Virtual Hydrologists Project that aims to recognize the legacy of eminent hydrologists.
