= Los Guerrero =

- Town
- Location within Jalisco Location within Mexico
- Coordinates: 20°26′N 103°53′W
- Country: Mexico
- State: Jalisco
- Municipality: San Martin de Hidalgo
- Elevation: 1,285 m (4,216 ft)

Population
  - Total: 674

Los Guerrero is a town in the municipality of San Martín de Hidalgo in the state of Jalisco, Mexico. It has a population of 674 inhabitants.
