= Dwight Bentel =

American journalist

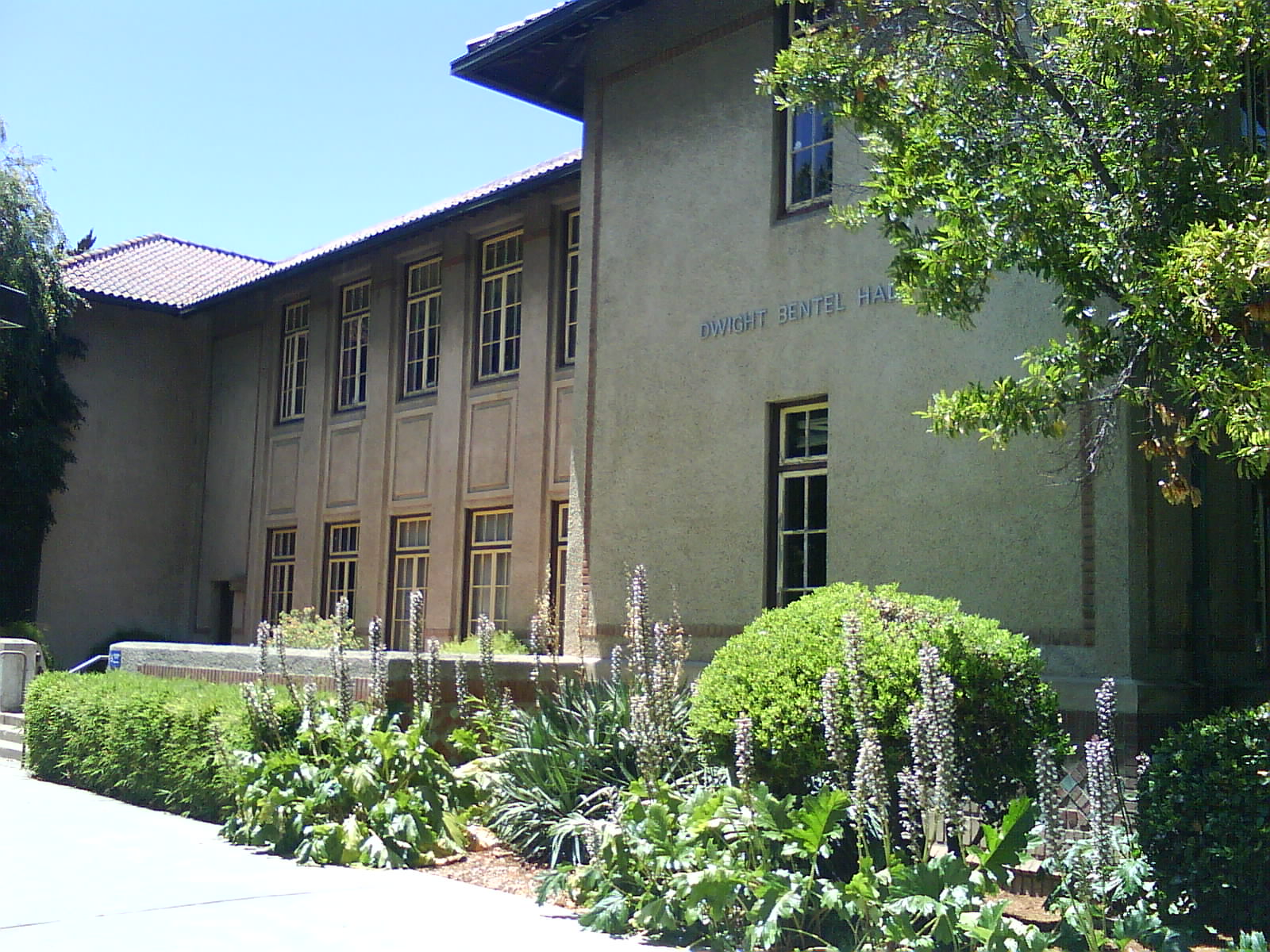
Dwight Bentel Hall, School of Journalism at San Jose State University

Dwight Essler Bentel (April 15, 1909 Walla Walla, Washington - May 16, 2012 Saratoga, California) was an American journalist and professor. He has been called "the father of journalism" at San Jose State University. In 1934, he founded the Spartan Daily, the campus newspaper. In 1936, he founded the School of Journalism and Mass Communications, which has produced six Pulitzer Prize winners and thousands of journalists, and is one of the largest programs of its kind in the nation. The school renamed the building that houses the school "Dwight Bentel Hall" in 1982. Subsequently, the on campus advertising agency has been named Dwight, Bentel and Hall Communications.

"You were just determined to be as good as you could because you knew that was what Dwight expected of you,"

— Professor Emeritus Gordon Greb,

Bentel started as a reporter for the San Jose Mercury Herald, in the lineage of the San Jose Mercury News in 1928. At the time the paper was engaged in a Prohibition era campaign to eliminate Speakeasys from San Jose. His first day on the job, editor Merle Gray handed Bentel a Spanish–American War-era Colt .45 revolver for his protection. He was thought to be the oldest living former member of the San Jose Mercury News staff. He also worked for the Associated Press and the San Francisco Call-Bulletin.

Bentel began his collegiate education at San Jose State College also in 1928, before moving to Stanford University where he earned his B.A. in 1932 and masters in 1934. Shortly after that he was hired by San Jose State College President T. W. MacQuarrie. His short conversation was:

"Dwight, I would like you to possibly do a little publicity with the college, to teach some basic course or two in journalism and … Dwight, I don’t really know what your job is."

That led to the eventual establishment of the School of Journalism. Working on his own, he established the volunteer-run State College Times into a professionally run daily student newspaper.

"Beginning immediately, you are now on a standard three-unit performance — three units of payment as a requirement — and you do not come wandering in when you are ready to work. You are to come in at 1 in the afternoon and work until 4. Whether you have a story due, you come in at 1. At that time we did a review of that day’s paper and saw what was good. But it was no longer a choice of you to say whether you would come in and work.” “Who said we could give three units of credit? I did. Later I had a word with the administration.”

— Bentel,

"(The department) was his child. Dwight, until his last breath, was all about the importance of words and communication. His legacy is that there's power in that and there's power in what we do -- and with power comes responsibility."

— Valerie Coleman Morris, Emmy award- winning ex-CNN anchor,

During World War II, Bentel left the department in the hands of Dolores Freitas Spurgeon, while he worked as a war news writer in New York City. He studied at Columbia University, eventually earning his doctoral degree. Meanwhile, Spurgeon kept the Spartan Daily alive by printing on a Mimeograph while newsprint was in short supply.

Bentel returned to San Jose State University (formerly San Jose State College) in 1947 after earning his doctoral degree and continued to teach there until his retirement in 1974. The program grew to one of the largest in the country, including specialties in advertising, public relations, photojournalism and radio and television broadcasting. The department was one of the first to require internships for graduation.

Bentel was a staunch defender of the First Amendment, reminding students from the first day:

Congress shall make no law abridging freedom of the press.

Congress was making no law when the executive branch imposed bureaucratic secrecy, he would explain, or when the judicial branch issued contempt citations to reporters protecting confidential news sources. The only guarantees, he would add, were the public's insistence that no one intrude on its right to know and the determination by the news media to fight for that right.

Truth is an absolute defense!

Bentel wrote a column for Editor and Publisher, plus wrote Stories of Santa Clara Valley, co-authored by Freitas Spurgeon and jointly authored The Encyclopedia of Photography; the Complete Photographer; the Comprehensive Guide and Reference for All Photographers. Bentel also had a lifelong passion for Death Valley, and spent many hours visiting, studying and researching the Valley and the people who inhabited it.
