= Photo (American magazine) =

PHOTO was the name of an American photographic magazine geared towards men. It was published monthly by the Official Magazine Corporation beginning in June 1952. The magazine mainly featured photographs of scantily clad women, although there were also exposés, featured articles, and examples of photojournalism.

== See also ==
- Cover girl
- List of men's magazines
- Pin-up girl
