= Jo Ann Callis =

American artist

- Born: 1940 (age 85–86); Cincinnati, Ohio, United States
- Education: University of California, Los Angeles (UCLA)
- Known for: Photography
- Employer: California Institute of the Arts

Jo Ann Callis (born 1940) is an American artist who works with photography and is based in California. Her work is held in various public collections.

== Life and work ==
Callis was born in Cincinnati, Ohio. Though she initially pursued a degree at Ohio State University in 1958, she dropped out in her second year when she got married. She and her husband moved to Southern California in 1961. Her father died after the birth of her first son, Stephen, in the same year. In 1963, her second son Michael was born. Callis enrolled at University of California, Los Angeles (UCLA) in 1970 initially in graphic design. When she took a course from Robert Heinecken in photography, she was encouraged by Heinecken to explore things within her mind.

In 1975, while still a student at UCLA, a year before finishing her Masters in Fine Arts, she was offered a position to work at California Institute of the Arts, where she works as of 2017.

Callis's work is primarily surrealist. Her themes have included domestic spaces and the role of motherhood, as demonstrated in Dish Trick (1985).

== Exhibitions ==
- Woman Twirling, J. Paul Getty Museum, Los Angeles, 2009
- Jo Ann Callis: Dish Trick, ROSEGALLERY, Santa Monica, CA, 2025

== Publications ==
- Woman Twirling. Los Angeles, CA: J. Paul Getty Museum, 2009. Text by Judith Keller.
- Decor. Thistle & Weed, 2013. Essay by Jennifer A. Watts.
- Other Rooms. New York: Aperture, 2014. ISBN 978-1-59711-275-8.

== Collections ==
Callis' work is held in the following public collections:

- Museum of Modern Art, New York.
- Los Angeles County Museum of Art, Los Angeles.
- J. Paul Getty Museum, Los Angeles.
