= James Lewis Wayman =

James Lewis Wayman from the San Jose State University, Pebble Beach, CA was named Fellow of the Institute of Electrical and Electronics Engineers (IEEE) in 2013 for contributions to standards, testing, and analysis of biometrics in automated human recognition systems.
