= Anacleto Rapping =

- Born: Nov 26, 1954; San Jose, California, U.S.
- Died: September 17, 2017 (aged 62)
- Occupations: photographer, pedagogue
- Years active: 1978–2017
- Spouse: Terrie L. Rapping (m. 1981)
- Children: Matthew, Ariel
- Website: arapping.com

Anacleto Rapping (November 26, 1954 – September 17, 2017) was an American photographer and pedagogue.

== Education ==
Anacleto Rapping studied journalism at San Jose State University (class of 1978).

== Career ==
As a staff photographer at the Los Angeles Times for over two decades, Rapping covered presidential campaigns, Olympic Games, World Cup Soccer tournaments and the Academy Awards. He has also served as an instructor at Brooks Institute of Photography, where he stressed the importance of foreign travel. Rapping also helped launch three new feature sections at the Los Angeles Times—Sunday Calendar, Home, and Outdoors.

Rapping previously worked for the Hartford Courant in Connecticut and the Thousand Oaks News Chronicle in California. He has taken assignments in South Africa, Australia, Papua New Guinea, Indonesia, Singapore, Guatemala, Mexico, Canada and throughout the United States. He has photographed four summer Olympic Games, one winter Olympics and three World Cup Soccer tournaments.

== Awards ==
Rapping has the distinct honor of sharing three Pulitzer Prizes for team coverage in news. Individually he received a Pulitzer nomination for his photography at the 1996 Summer Olympics in Atlanta. In 1986 he was awarded 2nd prize in the World Press Photo contest, and in 1996 he received three POYI awards.

== Death ==
On September 17, 2017, at the age of 62, Rapping died after a 3-year battle with cancer.
