= 2026 San Jose City Council election =

Local election in California

- June 2 (primary); November 3 (runoff)

5 of 10 seats on San Jose City Council

The 2026 San Jose City Council election took place on June 2, 2026, to elect five of the ten seats of the San Jose City Council, with runoff elections taking place on November 3, 2026. Runoffs will only occur if no candidate receives more than 50% of the votes cast in the contest. Local elections in California are officially nonpartisan. Each councilmember is term-limited after two consecutive terms in office.

== District 1 ==
Incumbent Rosemary Kamei was elected to the 1st district in 2022 in the primary with 65.7% of the vote. She is eligible for reelection.

=== Candidates ===
One candidate has successfully filed to run for the 1st district:

- Rosemary Kamei

=== Endorsements ===
Rosemary Kamei

Labor unions

- IBEW Local 332
- SEIU Local 1021
- South Bay Labor Council

Political parties

- Santa Clara County Democratic Party

Organizations

- Bay Area Municipal Elections Committee
- Dean Democratic Club of Silicon Valley
- Democratic Activists for Women Now (DAWN)
- Planned Parenthood Advocates Mar Monte
- UA Local 393

=== Results ===
2026 San Jose City Council 1st district election
Primary election
Candidate	Votes	%
Rosemary Kamei (incumbent)	12,261	100.0
Total votes	12,261	100.0

== District 3 ==
Omar Torres was elected to the 3rd district in 2022 in the runoff with 65.6% of the vote. Torres resigned his seat on November 5, 2024, before the end of his term. He was charged and convicted on several child molestation charges. Anthony Tordillos won the special election runoff in 2025 with 64.4% of the vote to finish the remainder of the term. Tordillos assumed office on August 12, 2025, and is eligible for reelection.

=== Candidates ===
One candidate has successfully filed to run for the 3rd district:

- Anthony Tordillos

=== Endorsements ===
Anthony Tordillos

Local officials

- David Cohen, San Jose city councilor from the 4th district (2020-present)
- Matt Mahan, Mayor of San Jose (2023-present)
- Michael Mulcahy, San Jose city councilor from the 6th district (2024-present)

Labor unions

- IFPTE Local 21
- OE Local 3
- South Bay Labor Council
- UA Local 393

Organizations

- Bay Area Municipal Elections Committee
- Dean Democratic Club of Silicon Valley
- Equality California
- Housing Action Coalition
- LGBTQ Victory Fund
- Planned Parenthood Advocates Mar Monte
- Victory Fund

Political parties

- Santa Clara County Democratic Party

=== Results ===
2026 San Jose City Council 3rd district election
Primary election
Candidate	Votes	%
Anthony Tordillos (incumbent)	10,588	100.0
Total votes	10,588	100.0

== District 5 ==
Incumbent Peter Ortiz was elected to the 5th district in 2022 in the runoff with 54.8% of the vote. He is eligible for reelection. Nora Campos previously held the 5th district seat from 2001 to 2010.

=== Candidates ===
Four candidates have successfully filed to run for the 5th district:

- Nora Campos
- Vy Dang
- Karen Martinez
- Peter Ortiz

=== Endorsements ===
Peter Ortiz

Labor unions

- AFSCME Council 57
- IBEW Local 332
- IFPTE Local 21
- OE Local 3
- SEIU Local 521
- SEIU Local 1021
- South Bay Labor Council
- UA Local 393

Political party organizations

- Santa Clara County Democratic Party
- California Working Families Party

Organizations

- Bay Area Municipal Elections Committee
- Dean Democratic Club of Silicon Valley
- Democratic Activists for Women Now (DAWN)
- South Bay Progressive Alliance
- Planned Parenthood Advocates Mar Monte
- Vote for Peace

=== Results ===
2026 San Jose City Council 5th district election
Primary election
Candidate	Votes	%
Peter Ortiz (incumbent)	6,183	45.0
Nora Campos	2,786	20.3
Karen Martinez	2,399	17.5
Vy Dang	2,377	17.3
Total votes	13,745	100.0
General election
Peter Ortiz (incumbent)		
Nora Campos		
Total votes		100.0

== District 7 ==
Incumbent Bien Doan was elected to the 7th district in 2022 in the runoff with 53.8% of the vote. He is eligible for reelection.

=== Candidates ===
Four candidates have successfully filed to run for the 7th district:

- Bien Doan
- Rafael Garcia
- Van Le
- Hanh-Giao Nguyen

=== Endorsements ===
Bien Doan

Labor unions

- South Bay Labor Council (co-endorsement with Nguyen and Garcia)
- UA Local 393 (co-endorsement with Garcia and Nguyen)

Organizations

- Silicon Valley Biz PAC
Rafael Garcia

Labor unions

- AFSCME Council 57 (co-endorsement with Nguyen)
- IBEW Local 332
- SEIU Local 1021 (co-endorsement with Nguyen)
- South Bay Labor Council (co-endorsement with Doan and Nguyen)
- UA Local 393 (co-endorsement with Doan and Nguyen)

Political party organizations

- Santa Clara County Democratic Party (co-endorsement with Nguyen)
Hanh-Giao Nguyen

Labor unions

- AFSCME Council 57 (co-endorsement with Garcia)
- SEIU Local 1021 (co-endorsement with Garcia)
- South Bay Labor Council (co-endorsement with Doan and Garcia)
- Teamsters Joint Council 42
- UA Local 393 (co-endorsement with Doan and Garcia)

Political party organizations

- Santa Clara County Democratic Party (co-endorsement with Garcia)

Organizations

- Democratic Activists for Women Now (DAWN)
- Planned Parenthood Advocates Mar Monte
- South Bay Progressive Alliance

=== Results ===
2026 San Jose City Council 7th district election
Primary election
Candidate	Votes	%
Bien Doan (incumbent)	6,201	47.9
Van Le	2,907	22.4
Rafael Garcia	2,614	20.2
Hanh-Giao Nguyen	1,232	9.5
Total votes	12,954	100.0
General election
Bien Doan (incumbent)		
Van Le		
Total votes		100.0

== District 9 ==
Incumbent Pam Foley was elected to the 9th district in 2018 and 2022. She is ineligible for reelection.

=== Candidates ===
Five candidates have successfully filed to run for the 9th district:

- Genny Altwer
- Rick Ator
- Gordon Chester
- Mike Hennessy
- Scott Hughes

=== Endorsements ===
Genny Altwer

Newspapers

- The Mercury News/East Bay Times

Federal officials

- Sam Liccardo, U.S. representative from California's 16th district (2025–present)

Local officials

- Margaret Abe-Koga, member of the Santa Clara County Board of Supervisors from District 5
- Pam Foley, vice mayor of San Jose
- Mike Hennessy, former candidate for district 9 of San Jose City Council
- Matt Mahan, mayor of San Jose (2023–present)
- Michael Mulcahy, member of the San Jose City Council from District 6
- Madison Nguyen, former vice mayor of San Jose

Organizations

- Planned Parenthood Advocates Mar Monte

Labor unions

- UA Local 393 (co-endorsement with Chester and Hughes)
Gordon Chester

Labor unions

- AFSCME Council 57
- IBEW Local 332
- SEIU Local 521
- SEIU Local 1021
- South Bay Labor Council (co-endorsement with Hennessy)
- UA Local 393 (co-endorsement with Altwer and Hughes)

Political party organizations

- Santa Clara County Democratic Party

Organizations

- Democratic Activists for Women Now (DAWN)
- South Bay Progressive Alliance
- South Bay YIMBY
- Vote for Peace

State legislators

- Dave Cortese, member of the California State Senate from the 15th district (2020-present) (runoff election)
Mike Hennessy

State legislators

- Dave Cortese, member of the California State Senate from the 15th district (2020-present) (primary election)

Labor unions

- South Bay Labor Council (co-endorsement with Chester)
Scott Hughes

Local officials

- Pam Foley, Vice Mayor of San Jose
- Don Rocha, former member of the San Jose City Council from the 9th district

Organizations

- Bay Area Municipal Elections Committee

Labor unions

- UA Local 393 (co-endorsement with Altwer and Chester)

=== Results ===
2026 San Jose City Council 9th district election
Primary election
Candidate	Votes	%
Genny Altwer	7,846	35.5
Gordon Chester	4,906	22.2
Scott Hughes	4,186	19.0
Mike Hennessy	3,941	17.9
Rick Ator	1,194	5.4
Total votes	22,073	100.0
General election
Genny Altwer		
Gordon Chester		
Total votes		100.0
