= 2022 San Jose City Council election =

Local election in California

- June 7 (primary); November 8 (runoff)

5 of 10 seats on San Jose City Council

The 2022 San Jose City Council election took place on June 7, 2022, to elect five of the ten seats of the San Jose City Council, with runoff elections taking place on November 8, 2022. Runoffs only occurred if no candidate received more than 50% of the votes cast in the contest. Local elections in California are officially nonpartisan. Each councilmember is term-limited after two consecutive terms in office.

== District 1 ==
Incumbent Charles Jones was elected to the 1st district in 2014 and 2018. He was ineligible to run for reelection.

=== Endorsements ===
Rosemary Kamei

Individuals

- Jim Beall
- Dave Cortese
- Anna Eshoo
- Sergio Jimenez
- Charles Jones
- Ash Kalra
- Evan Low
- Raul Peralez
- Ro Khanna

Organizations

- Dean Democratic Club of Silicon Valley
- San Jose Fire Fighters
- Santa Clara County League of Conservation Voters

Labor unions

- AFL-CIO South Bay Labor Council

Newspapers

- The Mercury News

Political organizations

- Santa Clara County Democratic Party
- Silicon Valley Young Democrats
Ramona Arellano Snyder

Organizations

- Silicon Valley Biz PAC

Individuals

- Johnny Khamis
- Dev Davis

=== Results ===
2022 San Jose City Council 1st district election
Primary election
| Candidate | Votes | % |
|---|---|---|
| Rosemary Kamei | 9,943 | 65.7 |
| Ramona Arellano Snyder | 3,913 | 25.9 |
| Tim Gildersleeve | 1,280 | 8.5 |
| Total votes | 15,136 | 100.0 |

== District 3 ==
Incumbent Raul Peralez was elected to the 3rd district in 2014 and 2018. He was ineligible to run for reelection.

=== Endorsements ===
Omar Torres

Labor unions

- AFL-CIO South Bay Labor Council
- UA Local 393

Organizations

- Santa Clara County League of Conservation Voters (dual endorsement)
- Equality California
- HONOR PAC
- Bay Area Municipal Elections Committee

Individuals

- Magdalena Carrasco
- Cindy Chavez
- Ro Khanna
- Evan Low
- Raul Peralez
- Ken Yeager

Political organizations

- Santa Clara County Democratic Party
Joanna Rauh

Organizations

- Santa Clara County League of Conservation Voters (dual endorsement)
- San Jose Police Officers’ Association
- South Bay Progressive Alliance

Individuals

- Sam Liccardo
- Tom McEnery

Newspapers

- The Mercury News
Irene Smith

Organizations

- Citizens for Fiscal Responsibility
- Silicon Valley Business PAC

Individuals

- Dev Davis
- Pam Foley
Ivan Torres

Organizations

- Progressive Democrats for Social Justice

=== Results ===
2022 San Jose City Council 3rd district election
Primary election
| Candidate | Votes | % |
|---|---|---|
| Omar Torres | 5,182 | 44.2 |
| Irene Smith | 2,340 | 19.9 |
| Joanna Rauh | 1,776 | 15.1 |
| Elizabeth Chien-Hale | 1,647 | 14.0 |
| Ivan Torres | 785 | 6.7 |
| Total votes | 11,730 | 100.0 |
General election
| Omar Torres | 11,657 | 65.6 |
| Irene Smith | 6,107 | 34.4 |
| Total votes | 17,764 | 100.0 |

== District 5 ==
Incumbent Magdalena Carrasco was elected to the 5th district in 2014 and 2018. She was ineligible to run for reelection. Nora Campos previously held the 5th district seat from 2001 to 2010.

=== Endorsements ===
Peter Ortiz

Organizations

- Dean Democratic Club of Silicon Valley (runoff election)
- Santa Clara County League of Conservation Voters
- South Bay Progressive Alliance

Labor unions

- National Nurses United
- AFL-CIO South Bay Labor Council (dual endorsement)
- UA Local 393 (dual endorsement)

Political organizations

- Santa Clara County Democratic Party
- Silicon Valley Young Democrats

Individuals

- Bob Wieckowski
- Jim Beall
Andrés Quintero

Organizations

- Dean Democratic Club of Silicon Valley (primary election)

Individuals

- Jeff Rosen
- Cindy Chavez
- Marc Berman
Nora Campos

Labor unions

- San Jose Police Officers' Association
- AFL-CIO South Bay Labor Council (dual endorsement)
- UA Local 393 (dual endorsement)

Individuals

- Dave Cortese
Rolando Bonilla

Individuals

- Josh Becker
- Sergio Jimenez
- David Cohen

Organizations

- Silicon Valley Biz PAC

=== Results ===
2022 San Jose City Council 5th district election
Primary election
| Candidate | Votes | % |
|---|---|---|
| Nora Campos | 3,545 | 30.9 |
| Peter Ortiz | 2,577 | 22.5 |
| Hg "Hanh Gaio" Nguyen | 1,960 | 17.1 |
| Rolando Bonilla | 1,788 | 15.6 |
| Andrés Quintero | 1,594 | 13.9 |
| Total votes | 11,464 | 100.0 |
General election
| Peter Ortiz | 9,074 | 54.8 |
| Nora Campos | 7,479 | 45.2 |
| Total votes | 16,553 | 100.0 |

== District 7 ==
Incumbent Maya Esparza was elected to the 7th district in 2018 in the runoff with 54.2% of the vote. She was eligible for reelection.

=== Endorsements ===
Maya Esparza

Labor unions

- IBEW Local 332
- AFL-CIO South Bay Labor Council
- UA Local 393
- San Jose Fire Fighters Local 230

Organizations

- Santa Clara County League of Conservation Voters

Political organizations

- Santa Clara County Democratic Party
- Silicon Valley Young Democrats

Newspapers

- The Mercury News

Individuals

- Zoe Lofgren
Bien Doan

Organizations

- Silicon Valley Biz PAC

Individuals

- Dev Davis
- Tam Nguyen
- Johnny Khamis
Van Le

Individuals

- Otto Lee
- J. Manuel Herrera

=== Results ===
2022 San Jose City Council 7th district election
Primary election
| Candidate | Votes | % |
|---|---|---|
| Maya Esparza (incumbent) | 5,449 | 47.5 |
| Bien Doan | 3,298 | 28.8 |
| Van Le | 2,719 | 23.7 |
| Total votes | 11,466 | 100.0 |
General election
| Bien Doan | 9,170 | 53.8 |
| Maya Esparza (incumbent) | 7,877 | 46.2 |
| Total votes | 17,047 | 100.0 |

== District 9 ==
Incumbent Pam Foley was elected to the 9th district in 2018 in the runoff with 50.8% of the vote. She was eligible for reelection.

=== Endorsements ===
Pam Foley

Organizations

- Silicon Valley Biz PAC

=== Results ===
2022 San Jose City Council 9th district election
Primary election
| Candidate | Votes | % |
|---|---|---|
| Pam Foley (incumbent) | 16,051 | 100.0 |
| Total votes | 16,051 | 100.0 |
