= 2006 San Jose City Council election =

Local election in California

- June 6 (primary); November 7 (runoff)

5 of 10 seats on San Jose City Council

The 2006 San Jose City Council election took place on June 6, 2006, to elect five of the ten seats of the San Jose City Council, with runoff elections taking place on November 7, 2006. Runoffs only occurred if no candidate received more than 50% of the votes cast in the contest. Local elections in California are officially nonpartisan. Each councilmember is term-limited after two consecutive terms in office.

== District 1 ==
Incumbent Linda J. LeZotte was elected to the 1st district in 1998 and 2002. She was ineligible to run for reelection.

=== Endorsements ===
Jay James

Labor unions

- Teamsters Joint Council 7

=== Results ===
2006 San Jose City Council 1st district election
Primary election
| Candidate | Votes | % |
|---|---|---|
| Pete Constant | 7,066 | 64.5 |
| Jay James | 3,324 | 30.4 |
| Ross Signorino | 558 | 5.1 |
| Total votes | 10,948 | 100.0 |

== District 3 ==
Incumbent Cindy Chavez was elected to the 3rd district in 1998 and 2002. She was ineligible to run for reelection.

=== Endorsements ===
Sam Liccardo

Organizations

- Santa Clara County League of Conservation Voters
Manny Diaz

Labor unions

- Teamsters Joint Council 7

=== Results ===
2006 San Jose City Council 3rd district election
Primary election
| Candidate | Votes | % |
|---|---|---|
| Sam Liccardo | 3,616 | 43.0 |
| Manny Diaz | 3,022 | 35.9 |
| Joel Wyrick | 742 | 8.8 |
| Jose Posadas | 315 | 3.7 |
| Bill Chew | 247 | 2.9 |
| Dennis Kyne | 205 | 2.4 |
| Candy Russell | 134 | 1.6 |
| Andrew Abraham Diaz | 128 | 1.5 |
| Total votes | 8,409 | 100.0 |
General election
| Sam Liccardo | 7,883 | 61.3 |
| Manny Diaz | 4,977 | 38.7 |
| Total votes | 12,860 | 100.0 |

== District 5 ==
Incumbent Nora Campos was elected to the 5th district in 2001 in the special election primary, and was subsequently reelected in 2002. She was eligible to run for reelection.

=== Endorsements ===
Nora Campos

Labor unions

- Teamsters Joint Council 7

=== Results ===
2006 San Jose City Council 5th district election
Primary election
| Candidate | Votes | % |
|---|---|---|
| Nora Campos (incumbent) | 6,056 | 100.0 |
| Total votes | 6,056 | 100.0 |

== District 7 ==
Terrance "Terry" Gregory was elected to the 7th district in 2002 in the runoff with 60.7% of the vote. He later resigned from his seat due to corruption charges. Incumbent Madison Nguyen was elected in 2005 in the special election runoff with 62.5% of the vote.

=== Endorsements ===
Madison Nguyen

Labor unions

- Teamsters Joint Council 7

=== Results ===
2006 San Jose City Council 7th district election
Primary election
| Candidate | Votes | % |
|---|---|---|
| Madison Nguyen (incumbent) | 7,179 | 100.0 |
| Total votes | 7,179 | 100.0 |

== District 9 ==
Incumbent Judy Chirco was elected to the 5th district in 2002 in the primary with 57.1% of the vote. She was eligible to run for reelection.

=== Endorsements ===
Judy Chirco

Labor unions

- Teamsters Joint Council 7

=== Results ===
2006 San Jose City Council 9th district election
Primary election
| Candidate | Votes | % |
|---|---|---|
| Judy Chirco (incumbent) | 9,553 | 63.6 |
| Kevin Fanning | 2,913 | 19.4 |
| David Cueva | 2,548 | 17.0 |
| Total votes | 15,014 | 100.0 |
