= 2010 San Jose City Council election =

Local election in California

- June 8 (primary); November 2 (runoff)

5 of 10 seats on San Jose City Council

The 2010 San Jose City Council election took place on June 8, 2010, to elect five of the ten seats of the San Jose City Council, with runoff elections taking place on November 2, 2010. Runoffs only occurred if no candidate received more than 50% of the votes cast in the contest. Local elections in California are officially nonpartisan. Each councilmember is term-limited after two consecutive terms in office.

== District 1 ==
Incumbent Pete Constant was elected to the 1st district in 2006 in the primary with 64.5% of the vote. He was eligible to run for reelection.

=== Results ===
2010 San Jose City Council 1st district election
Primary election
Candidate	Votes	%
Pete Constant (incumbent)	7,968	66.3
David Clancy	2,439	20.3
Tom Johnston	1,609	13.4
Total votes	12,016	100.0

== District 3 ==
Incumbent Sam Liccardo was elected to the 3rd district in 2006 in the runoff with 61.3% of the vote. He was eligible to run for reelection.

=== Results ===
2010 San Jose City Council 3rd district election
Primary election
Candidate	Votes	%
Sam Liccardo (incumbent)	6,305	80.2
Timothy Hennessey	1,561	19.8
Total votes	7,866	100.0

== District 5 ==
Incumbent Nora Campos was elected to the 5th district in a special election in 2005 in a special election primary, and was subsequently reelected in 2002 and 2006. She was ineligible to run for reelection.

=== Endorsements ===
Magdalena Carrasco

Newspapers

- San Jose Inside

Organizations

- San Jose Silicon Valley ChamberPAC
- Sierra Club Loma Prieta

=== Results ===
2010 San Jose City Council 5th district election
Primary election
Candidate	Votes	%
Xavier Campos	2,791	35.4
Magdalena Carrasco	2,771	35.2
J. Manuel Herrera	1,797	22.8
Aaron Resendez	517	6.6
Total votes	7,876	100.0
General election
Xavier Campos	5,218	51.8
Magdalena Carrasco	4,847	48.2
Total votes	9,975	100.0

== District 7 ==
Incumbent Madison Nguyen was elected to the 7th district in 2006 in the primary with 100% of the vote. She was eligible to run for reelection.

=== Endorsements ===
Madison Nguyen

Newspapers

- San Jose Inside

Organizations

- Sierra Club Loma Prieta
Minh Duong

Organizations

- San Jose Silicon Valley Chamber of Commerce

=== Results ===
2010 San Jose City Council 7th district election
Primary election
Candidate	Votes	%
Madison Nguyen (incumbent)	4,578	41.3
Minh Duong	2,666	24.1
Patrick Phu Le	1,895	17.1
Rudy J. Rodriguez	1,586	14.3
Vietnam Nguyen	351	3.2
Total votes	11,076	100.0
General election
Madison Nguyen	7,625	54.3
Minh Duong	6,410	45.7
Total votes	14,035	100.0

== District 9 ==
Incumbent Judy Chirco was elected to the 9th district in 2002 and 2006. She was ineligible to run for reelection.

=== Endorsements ===
Donald Rocha

Newspapers

- San Jose Inside

Organizations

- Sierra Club Loma Prieta

Labor unions

- AFL-CIO South Bay Labor Council

=== Results ===
2010 San Jose City Council 9th district election
Primary election
Candidate	Votes	%
Donald Rocha	7,474	43.0
Larry Pegram	4,284	26.0
Jim Cogan	2,295	13.2
Robert Cortese	1,265	7.3
Chad Greer	1,128	6.5
David Cueva	930	5.7
Total votes	16,446	100.0
General election
Donald Rocha	15,549	63.0
Larry Pegram	9,139	37.0
Total votes	24,688	100.0
