= 2018 San Jose City Council election =

Local election in California

- June 5 (primary); November 6 (runoff)

5 of 10 seats on San Jose City Council

The 2018 San Jose City Council election took place on June 5, 2018, to elect five of the ten seats of the San Jose City Council, with runoff elections taking place on November 6, 2018. Runoffs only occurred if no candidate received more than 50% of the votes cast in the contest. Local elections in California are officially nonpartisan. Each councilmember is term-limited after two consecutive terms in office.

== District 1 ==
Incumbent Charles Jones was elected to the 1st district in 2014 in the runoff with 59.3% of the vote. He was eligible to run for reelection.

=== Results ===
2018 San Jose City Council 1st district election
Primary election
Candidate	Votes	%
Charles "Chappie" Jones (incumbent)	12,440	100.0
Total votes	12,440	100.0

== District 3 ==
Incumbent Raul Peralez was elected to the 3rd district in 2014 in the runoff with 59.1% of the vote. He was eligible to run for reelection.

=== Endorsements ===
Raul Peralez

Political organizations

- Santa Clara County Democratic Party
- Silicon Valley Young Democrats

Labor unions

- International Union of Bricklayers and Allied Craftworkers Local 3 California
- AFL-CIO South Bay Labor Council

=== Results ===
2018 San Jose City Council 3rd district election
Primary election
Candidate	Votes	%
Raul Peralez (incumbent)	10,077	100.0
Total votes	10,077	100.0

== District 5 ==
Incumbent Magdalena Carrasco was elected to the 5th district in 2014 in the primary with 53.1% of the vote. She was eligible to run for reelection.

=== Endorsements ===
Magdalena Carrasco

Labor unions

- International Union of Bricklayers and Allied Craftworkers Local 3 California
- AFL-CIO South Bay Labor Council

Political organizations

- Santa Clara County Democratic Party

=== Results ===
2018 San Jose City Council 5th district election
Primary election
Candidate	Votes	%
Magdalena Carrasco (incumbent)	6,707	68.9
Jennifer Imhoff	1,525	15.7
Danny Garza	1,497	15.4
Total votes	9,729	100.0

== District 7 ==
Incumbent Tam Nguyen was elected to the 7th district in 2014 in the runoff with 50.8% of the vote. He was eligible for reelection.

=== Endorsements ===
Maya Esparza

Labor unions

- AFSCME Council 57
- IFPTE Local 21
- International Union of Bricklayers and Allied Craftworkers Local 3 California
- Teamsters Joint Council 7
- AFL-CIO South Bay Labor Council

Political organizations

- Santa Clara County Democratic Party

Organizations

- Bay Area Municipal Elections Commission (BAYMEC)
- Santa Clara County League of Conservation Voters

Individuals

- Cindy Chavez
- Dave Cortese
- Sergio Jimenez
- Ro Khanna
- Raul Peralez
- Ken Yeager
Tam Nguyen

Organizations

- Sierra Club Loma Prieta Chapter
Thomas Duong

Newspapers

- The Mercury News
Omar Vasquez

Organizations

- South Bay Progressive Alliance

=== Results ===
2018 San Jose City Council 7th district election
Primary election
Candidate	Votes	%
Tam Nguyen (incumbent)	3,560	30.2
Maya Esparza	2,952	25.1
Van T. Le	1,549	13.2
Thomas Duong	1,382	11.7
Jonathan Benjamin Fleming	1,275	10.8
Omar Vasquez	716	6.1
Hoang "Chris" Le	344	2.9
Total votes	11,778	100.0
General election
Maya Esparza	11,165	54.2
Tam Nguyen (incumbent)	9,452	45.8
Total votes	20,617	100.0

== District 9 ==
Incumbent Donald Rocha was elected to the 9th district in 2010 and 2014. He was ineligible for reelection.

=== Endorsements ===
Kalen Gallagher

Political organizations

- Silicon Valley Young Democrats
- Santa Clara County Democratic Party (runoff election)
- Dean Democratic Club of Silicon Valley (dual endorsement)

Organizations

- Santa Clara County League of Conservation Voters (runoff election)

Individuals

- Marc Berman
Shay Franco-Clausen

Labor unions

- AFL-CIO South Bay Labor Council
- International Union of Bricklayers and Allied Craftworkers Local 3 California

Political organizations

- Santa Clara County Democratic Party (primary election

Organizations

- Bay Area Municipal Elections Commission (BAYMEC)
- Equality California
- Santa Clara County League of Conservation Voters (primary election)
- South Bay Progressive Alliance

Individuals

- Sergio Jimenez
Pam Foley

Organizations

- Bay Area Municipal Elections Commission (BAYMEC)
- Silicon Valley Organization
- Santa Clara County Association of Realtors

Individuals

- Judy Chirco
- Johnny Khamis
- Sam Liccardo
- Madison Nguyen
- Chuck Reed

Newspapers

- The Mercury News
Rosie Zepeda

Political organizations

- Dean Democratic Club of Silicon Valley (dual endorsement)

=== Results ===
2018 San Jose City Council 9th district election
Primary election
Candidate	Votes	%
Pam Foley	6,339	31.4
Kalen Gallagher	6,119	30.3
Shay Franco-Clausen	3,674	18.2
Rosie Zepeda	1,488	7.4
Scott D. Nelson	1,359	6.7
Sabuhi Siddique	1,225	6.1
Total votes	20,204	100.0
General election
Pam Foley	15,930	50.8
Kalen Gallagher	15,414	49.2
Total votes	31,344	100.0
