= 2014 San Jose City Council election =

Local election in California

- June 3 (primary); November 4 (runoff)

5 of 10 seats on San Jose City Council

The 2014 San Jose City Council election took place on June 3, 2014, to elect five of the ten seats of the San Jose City Council, with runoff elections taking place on November 4, 2014. Runoffs only occurred if no candidate received more than 50% of the votes cast in the contest. Local elections in California are officially nonpartisan. Each councilmember is term-limited after two consecutive terms in office.

== District 1 ==
Incumbent Pete Constant was elected to the 1st district in 2006 and 2010. He was ineligible to run for reelection.

=== Endorsements ===
Paul Fong

Organizations

- Santa Clara County League of Conservation Voters (dual endorsement)
- Sierra Club

Political party organizations

- Santa Clara County Democratic Central Committee

Individuals

- Judy Circo
- Norman Mineta
- Charlotte Powers
- Ken Yeager

Labor unions

- SEIU Local 521
Charles "Chappie" Jones

Individuals

- Sam Liccardo
- Chuck Reed

Newspapers

- San Jose Inside
Bob Levy

Organizations

- Santa Clara County League of Conservation Voters (dual endorsement)

=== Results ===
2014 San Jose City Council 1st district election
Primary election
Candidate	Votes	%
Paul Fong	3,575	29.0
Charles "Chappie" Jones	2,805	22.8
Bob Levy	2,142	17.4
Susan Marsland	2,096	17.0
Art Zimmermann	863	7.0
Richard McCoy	677	5.5
Tim Gildersleeve	153	1.2
Total votes	12,311	100.0
General election
Charles "Chappie" Jones	10,311	59.3
Paul Fong	7,070	40.7
Total votes	17,381	100.0

== District 3 ==
Incumbent Sam Liccardo was elected to the 3rd district in 2006 and 2010. He was ineligible to run for reelection.

=== Endorsements ===
Raul Peralez

Organizations

- Santa Clara County League of Conservation Voters
- Sierra Club

Political party organizations

- Santa Clara County Democratic Central Committee (dual endorsement)

Labor unions

- SEIU Local 521
Kathy Yamada Sutherland

Political party organizations

- Santa Clara County Democratic Central Committee (dual endorsement)
Don Gagliardi

Newspapers

- San Jose Inside

=== Results ===
2014 San Jose City Council 3rd district election
Primary election
Candidate	Votes	%
Raul Peralez	2,493	27.7
Don Gagliardi	2,179	24.2
Kathy Yamada Sutherland	2,008	22.3
George Kleidon	1,061	11.8
Mauricio Mejia	737	8.2
John H. Hosmon	510	5.7
Total votes	8,988	100.0
General election
Raul Peralez	7,605	59.1
Don Gagliardi	5,255	40.9
Total votes	12,860	100.0

== District 5 ==
Incumbent Xavier Campos was elected to the 5th district in 2010 in the runoff with 51.8% of the vote. He was eligible to run for reelection.

=== Endorsements ===
Xavier Campos

Political party organizations

- Santa Clara County Democratic Central Committee

Organizations

- Santa Clara County League of Conservation Voters

Labor unions

- SEIU Local 521
Magdalena Carrasco

Newspapers

- San Jose Inside

=== Results ===
2014 San Jose City Council 3rd district election
Primary election
Candidate	Votes	%
Magdalena Carrasco	4,369	53.1
Xavier Campos (incumbent)	2,744	33.4
Aaron Resendez	1,108	13.5
Total votes	8,221	100.0

== District 7 ==
Incumbent Madison Nguyen was elected to the 7th district in 2006 and 2010. She was ineligible to run for reelection.

=== Endorsements ===
Buu Thai

Organizations

- Santa Clara County League of Conservation Voters
- Sierra Club

Political party organizations

- Santa Clara County Democratic Central Committee (dual endorsement)
Maya Esparza

Political party organizations

- Santa Clara County Democratic Central Committee (dual endorsement)
Van Le

Organizations

- The Lincoln Club of Northern California

=== Results ===
2014 San Jose City Council 7th district election
Primary election
Candidate	Votes	%
Tam Nguyen	3,270	31.1
Maya Esparza	3,083	29.3
Van Le	2,826	26.9
Buu Thai	1,339	12.7
Total votes	10,518	100.0
General election
Tam Nguyen	6,942	50.8
Maya Esparza	6,733	49.2
Total votes	13,675	100.0

== District 9 ==
Incumbent Donald Rocha was elected to the 9th district in 2010 in the runoff with 63.0% of the vote. He was eligible for reelection.

=== Endorsements ===
Donald Rocha

Organizations

- Santa Clara County League of Conservation Voters
- Sierra Club

Political party organizations

- Santa Clara County Democratic Central Committee

Labor unions

- SEIU Local 521

Newspapers

- San Jose Inside

=== Results ===
2014 San Jose City Council 9th district election
Primary election
Candidate	Votes	%
Donald Rocha (incumbent)	11,137	74.5
Lois Wilco-Owens	3,813	25.5
Total votes	14,950	100.0
