= Wasco State Prison =

American prison in California

Wasco State Prison-Reception Center (WSP)
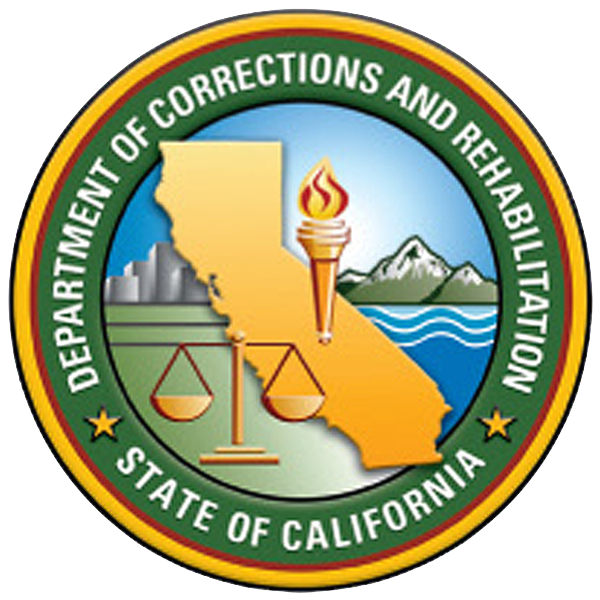
- Aerial View
- Interactive map of Wasco State Prison-Reception Center (WSP)
- Location: Wasco, California; 35.5939°N 119.4087°W
- Status: Operational
- Security class: Medium
- Capacity: 2,984
- Population: 3,698 (123.9% capacity) (January 31, 2023)
- Opened: 1991
- Managed by: California Department of Corrections and Rehabilitation
- Warden: Heather Shirley

Wasco State Prison-Reception Center (WSP) is a 634-acre (257 ha) state prison located in Wasco in Kern County, California.

The Wasco facility was the first of two reception centers in Kern County. The primary mission is to provide short term housing necessary to process, classify, and evaluate new inmates physically and mentally, to determine their security level, program requirements, and appropriate institutional placement. A 400-bed medium custody facility houses general population inmates to help support and maintain the reception center. A minimum custody facility provides institutional maintenance and landscaping services.

Location of Wasco in Kern County, and Kern County in California

As of July 31, 2022, Wasco was incarcerating people at 122.8% of its design capacity, with 3,667 occupants.

== Notable inmates ==
- Kori Ali Muhammad, moved to Kern Valley State Prison
- Cain Velasquez, former UFC Heavyweight Champion
- Brandon Browner, moved to San Quentin State Prison
- John Getreu, moved to Richard J. Donovan Correctional Facility
- Omar Torres, former San Jose city councilmember and convicted sex offender
