= 2017 Fresno shootings =

Shooting spree in California, U.S.

2017 Fresno shooting spree
- Location: Fresno, California, United States
- Date: April 13/18, 2017 c. 10:45 a.m. – c. 10:49 a.m. (PDT)
- Target: White men
- Attack type: Spree shooting
- Weapon: .357 Magnum black Colt Python revolver
- Deaths: 4
- Injuries: 0
- Perpetrator: Kori Ali Muhammad
- Motive: Anti-white racism; Nation of Islam hate rhetoric

On April 18, 2017, a spree shooting took place in Fresno, California, United States. Three people were killed before the perpetrator, 39-year-old Kori Ali Muhammad, was arrested.

Muhammad was already wanted for killing a security guard at a Motel 6 on April 13. He stated that he committed the shootings because of his hatred for white people, particularly white men. He had attempted to kill another three white men during the shootings, but the gunshots did not strike their target.

On his social media posts, police stated that Muhammad made posts of him hating White people and expressing anti-government views. Muhammad shouted, "Allahu Akbar" (translated as "God is greater" in Arabic) when he was apprehended; however, police determined that the crime was not due to religious extremism and categorized it instead as a hate crime. Muhammad was not affiliated with any terrorist groups.

Kori Muhammad was convicted of all four murders and four attempted murders. Kori Muhammad was sentenced to life in prison without the possibility of parole.

== Timeline of events ==
=== Motel 6 shooting ===
At approximately 11:00 p.m. on April 13, Carl Williams, an unarmed security guard working at a Motel 6 in central Fresno observed a man, Kori Ali Muhammad, visiting a woman who had checked into one of the rooms. Since motel policy mandated all visitors to provide identification at the office, Williams went to the room, with an armed coworker, to inform the pair of this policy. As Williams was escorting Muhammad and the woman to the motel office, an argument erupted between Williams and the woman. During the conversation, Muhammad walked a few steps away from Williams and then turned around and pulled out his handgun. Muhammad fired multiple shots at Williams from a close range, striking him multiple times and killing him. Muhammad's shooting of Williams was captured on the motel Wireless security camera. Muhammad also fired several shots toward the motel and at another security guard before fleeing. That guard was uninjured.

=== Manhunt ===
The woman, who had fled back to the room, was taken into custody on a felony accessory charge after attempting to take evidence from the crime scene and refusing to identify the gunman to police. According to investigators, the gunman escaped police detection at the motel by fleeing south to a nearby 7-Eleven and hiding out on the store rooftop, where he watched officers interview witnesses and waited for them to leave. Once they left the next morning, he got off of the rooftop, went to a nearby elementary school, and hid by a dumpster. He then traveled around Fresno over the weekend, changing his appearance by cutting his hair.

On April 18, Fresno police identified one suspect in the shooting, 39-year-old Kori Ali Muhammad. He was a friend of the daughter of the woman at the hotel. On the same morning, while out to purchase items for use in "voodoo rituals," Muhammad went to a Starbucks coffee shop and used the shop's Wi-Fi to watch a broadcast by Fresno ABC affiliate KFSN-TV that identified him as a suspect in the security guard's murder.

=== Downtown shootings ===
After being identified as a suspect in Williams' murder, Muhammad decided that he would not "go down for one murder" and that he "might as well take out as many white men" as he could. Hours after the identification, several shootings were reported in downtown Fresno. Muhammad first approached a Pacific Gas and Electric Company (PG&E) utility truck at approximately 10:45 a.m. and fired four shots into it, critically wounding an employee seated in the passenger seat. The passenger of the vehicle was identified to be Zachary Randalls. The driver of that truck was spared from being shot, since Muhammad deemed him Hispanic and thus non-white. The driver managed to drive away unharmed and took Randalls to the Fresno Police Department headquarters, where he alerted officers. Randalls was taken to Community Regional Medical Center, where he later died.

At Muhammad's murder trial, the driver of the PG&E utility truck testified that the truck was in park when Muhammad approached them sitting in it. From Muhammad's facial expression, the driver said Muhammad had a "cold, dark look" which the driver found to be unnerving. The driver nodded to Muhammad as a gesture from his window, to which Muhammad was unresponsive. Muhammad walked past the driver's left fender and then stopped, looking into the truck again. The driver told Randalls that he was suspicious of Muhammad's behavior at this moment. Muhammad then reached into his jacket, prompting the driver to immediately put the truck in reverse. Muhammad fired his gun a few times at the passenger's side, where Randalls was sitting, as the driver was backing up. As the driver backed up a sufficient distance from Muhammad, Muhammad fired off one last shot which hit the headrest of Randalls' seat. Randalls told the driver that he was shot. The driver called 9-1-1 emergency and drove to the police station because he did not know where the closest hospital was. The driver stated that Randalls lost consciousness on the way to the police station.

Seconds after shooting four rounds into the PG&E truck on N. Van Ness and mortally wounding Randalls, Muhammad proceeded south towards Mildreda Avenue, turning west. Muhammad fired two more shots at a 59-year-old man coming out of his house, but the shots missed. The second shot hit a residential dwelling on the other side of the street. Muhammad then reloaded his revolver in the alley between Van Ness and Fulton. Muhammad stated that he considered pursuing the 59-year-old man, believing he had gone back inside his house, but changed his mind. Muhammad then turned onto N. Fulton St heading south, where he fired once at a vehicle containing a woman, her adult daughter, and her four-year-old granddaughter, but stopped shooting after realizing they were Latino. No one in the vehicle suffered any gunshot wounds.

Muhammad then walked down the opposite direction, where he spotted a man, Mark Gassett, walking out of a Catholic Charities USA building. He shot Gassett once in the chest; he then killed him with two more shots after he had fallen to the ground. Muhammad then reloaded at a bus stop and fired at three white men. Two of them escaped unharmed, but Muhammad chased the third man, David Jackson. Muhammad followed Jackson, who was the heaviest and oldest of the three white men, into the parking lot of a Catholic Charities USA building. There, Muhammad fired six shots: two that killed Jackson, two that struck parked vehicles, one that struck a nearby building, and a sixth that was apparently never recovered. Witnesses said that Muhammad shouted obscenities as he fired.

Officers responding to shotspotter reports found Muhammad running down the street and managed to arrest him. During the arrest, Muhammad shouted, "Allahu Akbar!" Several bullets and speedloaders for a .357 Magnum revolver were recovered from his person, but no firearm was found. According to Chief Jerry Dyer, the gun was wrapped in clothing and picked up by a Hispanic male who had met up with Muhammad shortly after the shootings and then fled the scene. Dyer also said a total of seventeen shots were fired in 90 seconds during these shootings. Four minutes had passed between the first shots and Muhammad's arrest. Several streets and county government buildings were put on lockdown during the shootings, with people being ordered to shelter in place.

== Victims ==
All of the victims killed in the shootings were white males. The Motel 6 security guard was identified as 25-year-old Carl Williams. The victims of the April 18 shootings were identified the next day as PG&E employee Zackary David Randalls, 34, of Clovis; and Mark James Gassett, 37, and David Martin Jackson, 58, both of Fresno.

== Aftermath ==
The FBI and ATF were notified of the shootings. Agents from the Department of Homeland Security also responded to the Fresno Police Department headquarters. Chief Dyer said that the incident was "a random act of violence" and that the gunman acted alone, adding that it was "too soon" to determine whether the shootings were acts of terrorism. A federal law enforcement official said the shootings did not bear the hallmarks of a terrorist attack and appeared to be more of a "local, criminal matter".

Local authorities said they would investigate the shootings as a hate crime. Chief Dyer said that Kori Muhammad, who is black, told police he decided to become infamous for killing many white people after realizing he was wanted in the Motel 6 shooting. Muhammad led investigators through the murder scenes and described exactly how he committed the shooting rampage, laughing all the while.

Mayor Lee Brand offered his condolences to the victims' families and called April 18 "a sad day for us all". PG&E expressed its own condolences to all those involved, including the family of the slain employee.

== Perpetrator ==
Kori Ali Muhammad (born March 21, 1978) was the gunman in all of the shootings. Muhammad was homeless at the time, and had some association with gangs, but was not a member of one himself. He has three children.

=== Personal background ===
Born as Cory Allen Taylor, and also previously known as Kori Taylor, Muhammad changed his name to his present one as a teenager. He also used the names Kori McDonald and Kori MacSon McWallace. His grandmother said that Muhammad had been drawn to Islam at a young age. Muhammad's aunt said that her nephew also attended a Baptist church when he was younger.

Muhammad was a resident of both Fresno and Sacramento, California. According to Muhammad's Facebook page, he studied multimedia at Cosumnes River College in Sacramento. A spokesman for the Los Rios Community College District identified a student named Kori McWallace—with the same date of birth as Muhammad—who attended Cosumnes, American River College, and Sacramento City College at various times from 1996 to 2004. However, no details were immediately offered about his studies or if he graduated. Muhammad also attended classes at Fresno City College, but according to a classmate, he would often not show up for weeks at a time and accuse his instructors of being racist.

=== Previous criminal history ===
Muhammad had a criminal history dated from 1997 to 2004, consisting of arrests on weapons, drugs, forgery, and false imprisonment charges, as well as making terrorist threats. Court documents also indicated that he "suffered auditory hallucinations and had at least two prior mental health hospitalizations." Two of his earliest arrests occurred when he was still a teenager; on both occasions, he allegedly brought a gun to school. In 2004, Muhammad was arrested in Washington state for allegedly firing a gun outside his apartment. He left the state and the case was dismissed after prosecutors declined to extradite him to a federal prison.

According to court records filed in February 2005, he was arrested and indicted in federal court on charges of "possession of cocaine with intent to distribute, possession of a firearm for drug trafficking and possession of a firearm by a convicted felon". In September, Muhammad sought an insanity defense and underwent a psychiatric evaluation after his lawyer claimed his client was "suffering from hallucinations, paranoia and psychosis." A judge ruled that he was incompetent to stand trial and had him committed to a facility for up to four months. He was deemed competent in August 2006, after which he pleaded guilty to two of seven counts in the indictment. Muhammad was sentenced to over nine years in prison, though the sentence was downgraded to over seven years in 2008. He was released from prison early in September 2016.

Muhammad claimed to have shot a person at the age of twelve, but the claim was not confirmed by police.

=== Views and statements ===
Muhammad maintained two Facebook profiles and a Twitter account, all in which he paid homage to black pride and black nationalism. His profile depicted images of a Black Power salute and the Pan-African flag. According to police, he "expressed hatred of whites" and the government. Muhammad made posts about the murders of five Dallas police officers, in which he praised the shooter Micah Xavier Johnson. He also consistently used the hashtag "#LetBlackPeopleGo" and encouraged "black warriors" to "mount up". Muhammad's father described his son's belief that there was an ongoing war between whites and blacks, and that "a battle was about to take place." He later said that he attempted to warn Muhammad's probation officer about his son's hatred of white people and his plans of killing them, but believes no one followed up on his report.

In a phone interview with ABC affiliate KFSN-TV in downtown Fresno Jail, Kori Ali Muhammad spoke about his motives for the killings. Muhammad spoke about his hatred for white people and especially white men. Muhammad stated that "someone has to fight for them. Someone has to fight for all the people that died at the hands of racist white men." Muhammad stated that he initially planned to turn himself in for the murder of Carl Williams, but "[t]hen I started thinking about the missing black women and children... started thinking about Flint, Michigan... started thinking about the crack cocaine epidemic... started thinking about all the injustices and atrocities that my people go through. That's why I snapped. I wasn't thinking like I'm going to kill, kill, kill, all I know was that white supremacy has to die and people that benefit most from white supremacy are white men." Muhammad believed himself to be a martyr saying "I gave my life for the freedom of people. The ultimate freedom of my people." Muhammad stated that "Considering the crime I did, I can live with having to be in jail, like I know what I did was wrong." When asked if he regretted killing four people Muhammad stated that he did not.

In Muhammad's trial, Muhammad chose to testify and answer questions about the killings. When asked if he intended to kill a white man, Muhammad stated that "I wanted to kill them, yes". Muhammad kept alluding to his own version of ancient religious prophesies. Muhammad stated that "God is going to destroy white men in particular, specifically. It was written 25,000 years ago that this had to happen." Muhammad also compared his killings to COVID-19, stating that he shot Mark Gassett when he was on the ground to make sure he was dead. Muhammad stated "I wanted to kill him, just like the coronavirus is killing white men right now."

During testimony, Muhammad claimed that he was a god, and stated that God would destroy America if African-Americans were not given reparations. He also claimed to take credit for the destruction of Paradise, California during the 2018 Camp Fire.

After Muhammad's sentencing by the judge in the murder trial, statements were read in the courtroom by family members and friends of the victims. Muhammad left the courtroom during the statements, and later came back to give his own statement. Muhammad responded by initially offering condolences, and then talking about land and reparations for African Americans. Muhammad's comments did not sit well with members of the audience and some family members angrily proclaimed for Muhammad to suffer for the rest of his life. Muhammad responded back, taunting the victims by blowing kisses.

According to The Daily Beast, Muhammad's posts indicated a support of the Moorish Science Temple of America, an African American organization associated with the sovereign citizen movement, which advocated few beliefs similar to those of mainstream Islam. Brian Levin, director of Cal State San Bernardino's Center for the Study of Hate and Extremism, said that Muhammad's social media posts made multiple references to terms used by the Nation of Islam (NOI), a black supremacist organization labeled as a hate group by the Southern Poverty Law Center and the Anti-Defamation League. Muhammad made references to "grafted white devils", an expression frequently used in the Nation of Islam to describe white people, and "Yakub", the villainous figure responsible for creating white people in the Nation of Islam. Muhammad said he drew inspiration from Wallace Fard Muhammad, the founder of the Nation of Islam. Muhammad's relatives said that he "became involved" with the NOI when he was younger, but did not clarify what kind of role the group played in his life during his imprisonment and after his release.

Muhammad's beliefs included a mixture of the Nation of Islam and also voodoo which he said is called "Kali Sufi". He used amulets and necklaces for his voodoo religion, and referred to himself as a god.

In February, Muhammad released two hip hop albums on iTunes and YouTube under the name of B-God MacSun. The Los Angeles Times noted that Muhammad sang that he was an "Asiatic black god", and that the album's contents "repeatedly references violence between black and white people."

In addition, Muhammad produced a music-themed talk show at the Community Media Access Collaborative, a nonprofit organization specializing in promoting people and companies through the use of media. Muhammad's talk show ran for four episodes, which were produced between May 12, 2015, and October 10, 2016. In that talk show, he claimed that he had joined a Sacramento gang at the age of nine, the "black liberation movement" at the age of fourteen, and the NOI later on in his teens. The organization's director of operations described Muhammad, a frequenter at the facility, as "kind and curious" to the staff. However, a former friend who met Muhammad at the facility, but later removed him from his friended list on Facebook, described him as "intense and unnerving"

An imam at a local mosque said that Muhammad was not a member of his congregation. Following his arrest, Muhammad affirmed to officers that he is Muslim, but that he had not been to a mosque in 25 years and that he prays to a total of seven different deities. He also told officers that he was not officially affiliated with any terrorist groups.

== Legal proceedings ==
Following his arrest, Muhammad was charged with four counts of murder and two counts of assault with a deadly weapon. On April 21, 2017, he made his first court appearance for the murder of Carl Williams and the attempted murder of the second security guard at the Motel 6. During the hearing, he shouted on two different occasions, saying "Let black people go" and a phrase similar to "in reparations" that was not clearly enunciated. He also warned that natural disasters striking the U.S. will increase. As a result, criminal proceedings were suspended and the judge ordered a psychiatric evaluation for Muhammad, setting bail at $2.6 million. His next court appearance was scheduled on May 12, but was postponed to June 1 to give psychologists more time to prepare Muhammad's mental health report.

On October 13, 2017, the judge set a trial date for January 8, 2018. The initial hearings focused on Muhammad's mental competency. During the hearings, Muhammad shouted demands for slavery reparations and also yelled "Allahu akbar." Muhammad's lawyer said he continued to gather evidence that Muhammad was incompetent to be held criminally responsible. Two psychiatrists had determined that he was incompetent but another said that he was not. Psychologist J. Reid Meloy declared Muhammad competent and stated that he "knows 'shrink talk'". He knows how to communicate to a psychologist or psychiatrist when he's being interviewed because he knows what the psychiatrist or psychologist is looking for." Dr Meloy believed that Muhammad had schizophrenia, but that he was able to manage the condition effectively and not a factor in Muhammad's thinking to deduce right from wrong in the killings. On January 22, 2018, Judge Jonathan Conklin ruled that Muhammad was competent to stand trial.

Jury selection for Muhammad's trial began on February 4, 2020 and the trial began on March 2. Muhammad faced four murder charges and four attempted murder charges. Muhammad's trial was a death penalty case.

Muhammad testified in court that he shot and killed Carl Williams. He testified that he later went on a shooting spree and shot and killed Zachary Randalls, Mark Gassett, and David Jackson, and shot at three other white men. Muhammad confessed to trying to kill as many white men as he could. When asked why he shot Mark Gassett while he lay on the ground wounded from the previous shots, Muhammad admitted that his intention was "to kill him, just like the coronavirus is killing white men." He made several more references to COVID-19 when confessing to shooting people at the bus stop.

Kori Muhammad was convicted of second-degree murder of Carl Williams, Mark Gassett, and Zachary Randalls, and was convicted of first-degree murder of David Jackson with special circumstances pertaining to hate crime on race, and four attempted second-degree murders on April 22, 2020. The second phase of Muhammad's murder trial was to involve a sanity phase in which it was to determine if he was sane at the time of his murders. Muhammad's defense team made a deal with the prosecution to remove Muhammad's possible death penalty for the murders, and for Muhammad to receive a life sentence in prison in exchange for the sanity phase of the trial to be withdrawn. Muhammad was sentenced to life in prison without the possibility of parole. Muhammad was incarcerated in the Wasco State Prison but was later transferred to the Kern Valley State Prison and has since been transferred to the California Health Care Facility, where he is currently imprisoned on 2024.
