= Baby Bundle (app) =

Parenting application for iPhone and iPad

- Release: 2014
- Operating system: iOS
- Type: Mobile app
- License: Freemium
- Website: getbabybundle.com

Baby Bundle is a parenting mobile app for iPhone and iPad. It was designed to help new parents through pregnancy and the first two years of parenthood. Developed in collaboration with medical experts, it helps track and record the child's development and growth, offers parental advice, manages vaccinations and health check-ups, stores photos and provides baby monitoring services.

== History ==
Baby Bundle was founded in the United Kingdom by brothers, Nick and Anthony von Christierson. Each worked in investment banking prior to developing Baby Bundle, Nick at Greenhill & Co., and Anthony at Goldman Sachs.

The idea for the app came when a friend's wife voiced her frustration over having multiple parenting apps on her smartphone. Nick and Anthony left their jobs to create a single app that would include all those features. They conducted market research by interviewing more than 500 parents in the UK and US. It took them a year to build the app, which was named by their mother.

Looking for endorsement, they first went to the US in 2013 and partnered with parenting expert and pediatrician Dr. Jennifer Trachtenberg. Baby Bundle was launched in the US and Canadian App Stores in April 2014. In the same month, it became the #1 parenting app in iTunes and was featured by Apple as the #1 Editor's pick across all categories. Mashable called it one of the "Top 5 Can’t Miss Apps."

Baby Bundle raised $1.8m seed round in March 2015 to fund development. The money came from a range of angel investors from across the US, UK and Asia. The von Christierson brothers have signed a deal to co-brand the app in the Middle East and expect to launch in Europe and Africa.

== Features ==
Baby Bundle is an app for both the iPhone or iPad and provides smart monitoring tools and trackers for pregnancy and child development. It acts as a growth and daily activity tracker and offers parental advice, manages vaccinations and health check-ups. It has a parenting guide with tips and advice on what to expect when the baby arrives. An interactive forum also lets parents ask questions from others in the community. The app is free and also include paid premium features like the ability to turn two iPhones running into a baby monitor, a cloud service to share the child's data with a spouse and the ability to store data on more than one baby.
