= 2002 San Jose City Council election =

Local election in California

- March 5 (primary); November 5 (runoff)

5 of 10 seats on San Jose City Council

The 2002 San Jose City Council election took place on March 5, 2002, to elect five of the ten seats of the San Jose City Council, with runoff elections taking place on November 5, 2002. Runoffs only occurred if no candidate received more than 50% of the votes cast in the contest. Local elections in California are officially nonpartisan. Each councilmember is term-limited after two consecutive terms in office.

== District 1 ==
Incumbent Linda J. LeZotte was elected to the 1st district in 1998 in the runoff with 52.9% of the vote. She was eligible to run for reelection.

=== Results ===
2002 San Jose City Council 1st district election
Primary election
Candidate	Votes	%
Linda J. LeZotte (incumbent)	7,847	79.6
Ross Signorino	2,010	20.4
Total votes	9,857	100.0

== District 3 ==
Incumbent Cindy Chavez was elected to the 3rd district in 1998 in the runoff with 51.3% of the vote. She was eligible to run for reelection.

=== Results ===
2002 San Jose City Council 3rd district election
Primary election
Candidate	Votes	%
Cindy Chavez (incumbent)	4,870	100.0
Total votes	4,870	100.0

== District 5 ==
Incumbent Nora Campos was elected to the 5th district in 2001 in the special election primary with 56.0% of the vote. She was eligible to run for reelection.

=== Results ===
2002 San Jose City Council 5th district election
Primary election
Candidate	Votes	%
Nora Campos (incumbent)	3,870	69.9
Alex Ayala	1,663	30.1
Total votes	5,533	100.0

== District 7 ==
Incumbent George M. Shirakawa, Jr. was initially appointed to the 7th district in 1994 following the death of his father. He was reelected to the 7th district in 1994 and 1998. He was ineligible to run for reelection.

=== Results ===
2002 San Jose City Council 7th district election
Primary election
Candidate	Votes	%
Terrence "Terry" Gregory	2,367	32.8
Ed Voss	2,241	31.1
Bob Dhillon	1,583	21.9
Alfredo Benavides	821	11.4
Andrew G. Abraham Diaz	200	2.8
Total votes	5,629	100.0
General election
Terrence "Terry" Gregory	6,439	60.7
Ed Voss	4,176	39.3
Total votes	10,615	100.0

== District 9 ==
Incumbent John A. Diquisto was elected to the 9th district in 1994 and 1998. He was ineligible to run for reelection.

=== Results ===
2002 San Jose City Council 9th district election
Primary election
Candidate	Votes	%
Judy Chirco	7,815	57.1
Chris Hemingway	5,878	42.9
Total votes	13,693	100.0
