= Zenith Radio Nurse =

First electronic baby monitor

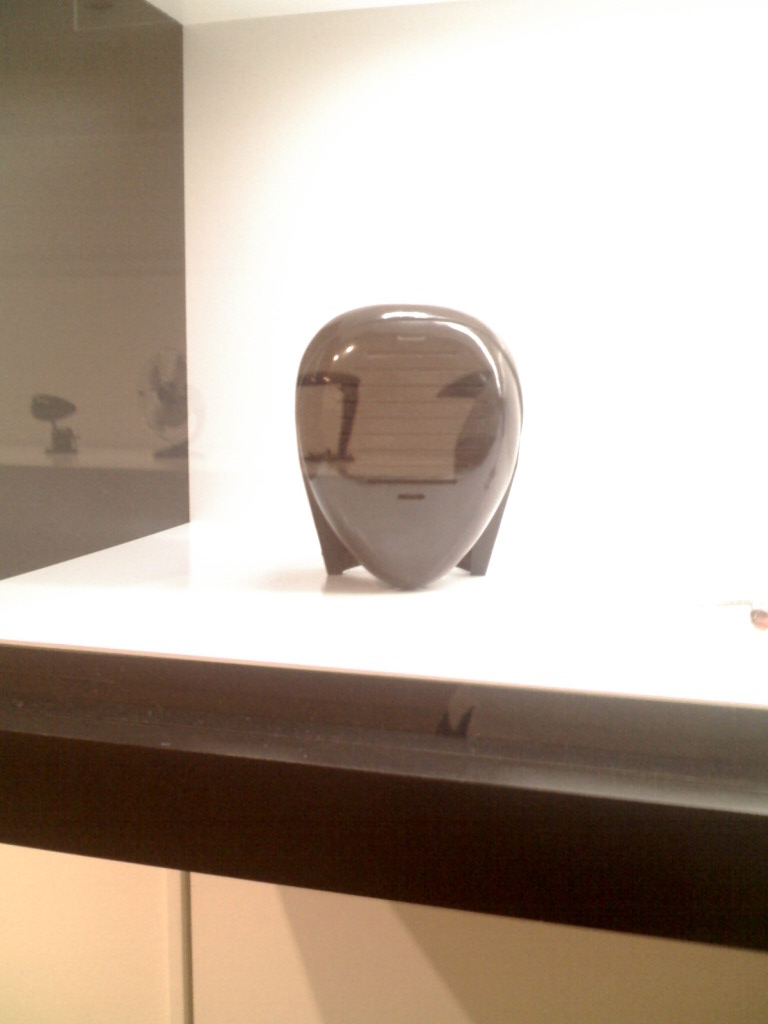
Zenith Radio Nurse (1938) bakelite designed by Isamu Noguchi, Montreal Museum of Fine Arts

The Zenith Radio Nurse was the first electronic baby monitor. Manufactured by the Zenith Radio Corporation, it went on sale in 1938. The product was developed by Zenith president Eugene F. McDonald, and designed by Japanese-American sculptor and product designer Isamu Noguchi. Although the product was manufactured for only a few years, it is still in demand as a collectible and is featured many museum collections for its design.

== Design, function and marketing ==
McDonald became concerned with his infant daughter's safety in the wake of the Lindbergh kidnapping. After creating an ad-hoc system of microphones and receivers, he passed the idea off to his engineers.

The Radio Nurse consisted of two components, the Radio Nurse Receiver and the Guardian Ear Transmitter. Noguchi designed the Radio Nurse Receiver, which was made from a dark colored Bakelite in a streamlined, calm, and subtly playful modernist form, with a concealed volume control wheel under the "chin" of the unit. The Guardian Ear Transmitter was a more utilitarian design of enameled metal. The Ear would be placed near the child’s crib or bed, while the Radio Nurse would be near the parents.

The Radio Nurse was Noguchi's first major design commission, and he referred to it as his "only strictly industrial design." The product encountered technical problems because it shared a radio frequency with other new consumer technologies including car radios and garage door opener.

Although the Radio Nurse has commonly been described as a baby monitor, an early Zenith advertisement mentioned invalids as well as infants, and featured an illustration of an elderly woman as well as a baby. This ad appeared in Hygeia, a popular magazine published by the American Medical Association.

== Commercial reception ==
The Radio Nurse retailed for $19.95 USD in 1938, roughly equivalent to over $670 in 2026. Unfortunately, the product suffered from poor sales. The price was prohibitive for most post-Depressive-era households, and radio signal sometimes leaked outside the house wiring, so people could hear strangers or be overheard, which discouraged adoption. Zenith discontinued production of the Radio Nurse in 1942, when they pivoted production to the war effort. The product was not revived post-war.

== Critical reception ==
In 1938, the Radio Nurse was included in an exhibition at the Whitney Museum of American Art. In its review of the show, Time said, "Most exotic: Isamu Noguchi's Radio Nurse, a grilled bakelite face—prettier as a radio than as a nurse."

Design historians Charlotte and Peter Fiell wrote that the Radio Nurse "displayed a remarkably refined synthesis of form and function". The Encyclopedia of Interior Design said that the Radio Nurse has a "strangely comforting watchful quality". Smithsonian magazine wrote that "It sits like a dark, faceless plastic mask, more like a prototype for a Star Wars film." On Antiques Roadshow, appraiser Gary Piattoni said, "What's significant about this piece is the design. It's an excellent example of modern design by a very famous Japanese-American designer called Isamu Noguchi."

Reflecting on the attention he received, Noguchi wrote in his autobiography, "By a curious switch, I thought of commercial art as less contaminated than one that appealed to vanity."

== Museum collections ==
The Radio Nurse is included in the collections of many American museums, such as the Metropolitan Museum of Art, the Henry Ford Museum, the Museum of Modern Art, the Noguchi Museum, the Cooper Hewitt, the Oakland Museum of California, the Yale University Art Gallery, and the Los Angeles County Museum of Art. It is also part of the collections of the Montreal Museum of Fine Arts, the Victoria and Albert Museum in London and the M+ museum in Hong Kong.
