= Omar Torres =

American sex offender and former politician

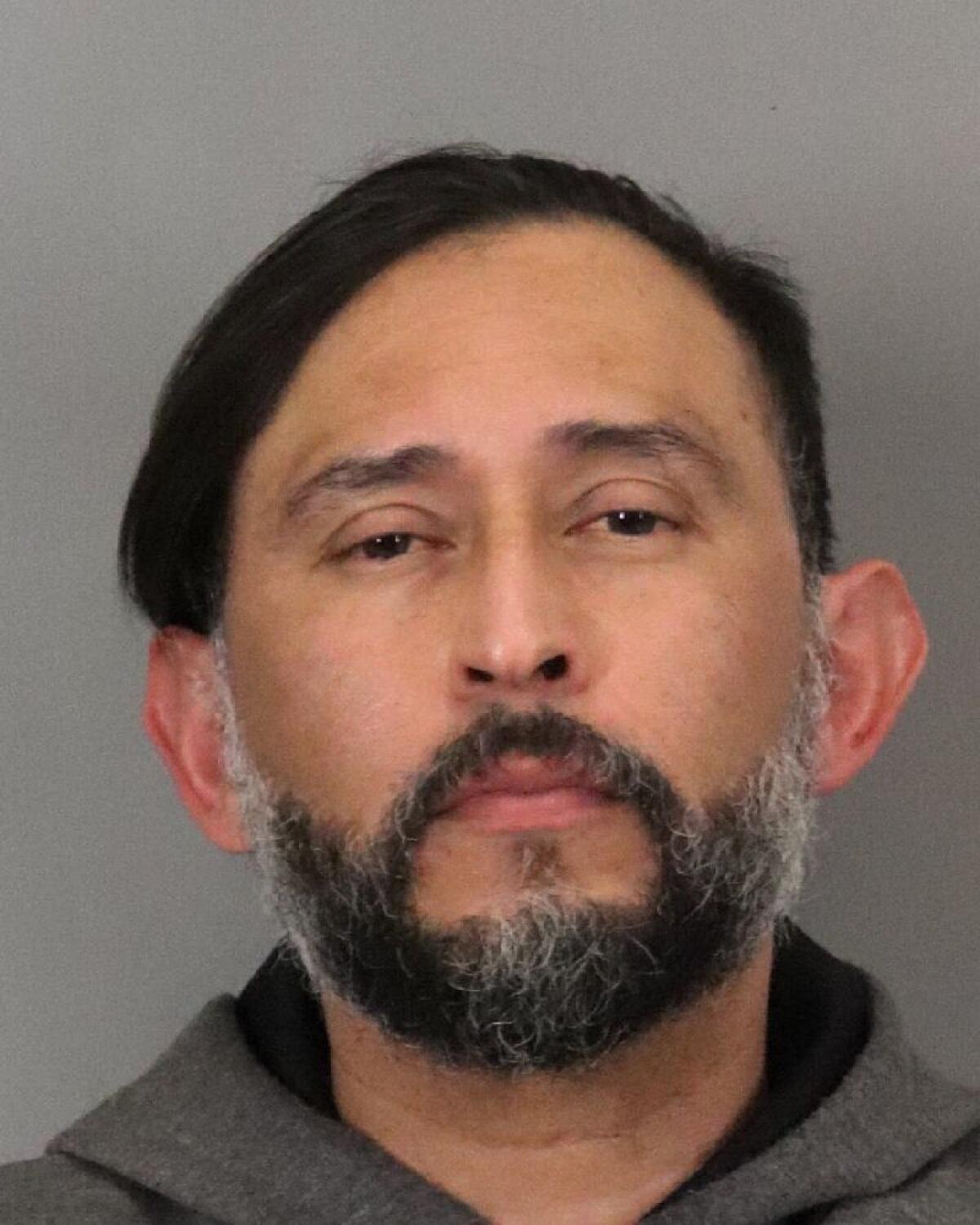
- 2024 mug shot of Torres

Member of the San Jose City Council from the 3rd district
- In office January 1, 2023 – November 27, 2024
- Preceded by: Raul Peralez
- Succeeded by: Anthony Tordillos

Personal details
- Born: Omar Torres; October 14, 1981 (age 44) San Jose, California, U.S.
- Party: Democratic
- Education: San José State University (BS)
- Criminal information
- Status: Incarcerated at California State Prison, Los Angeles County
- Convictions: Sodomy and oral copulation by force, violence, duress, menace or fear; lewd and lascivious acts against a minor
- Penalty: 18 years in prison

Omar Torres (born October 14, 1981) is an American convicted sex offender and former politician. A member of the Democratic Party, Torres served as a member of the San Jose City Council from the 3rd district from 2023 to 2024. He previously served as a trustee of the San José-Evergreen Community College District from 2020 to 2022 and the Franklin-McKinley School District from 2014 to 2018.

Torres was arrested on November 5, 2024, hours after resigning from the city council. He was charged with one count of lewd and lascivious acts against a minor and one count each of sodomy and oral copulation by force, violence, duress, menace or fear. He pled no contest upon his conviction and was sentenced to 18 years in state prison on August 29, 2025. Torres is currently incarcerated at California State Prison, Los Angeles County.

== Early life, education, and career ==
Torres was born in San Jose, California, on October 14, 1981, and raised in the Washington-Guadalupe neighborhood as the third of five children. The son of packagers at a local Del Monte Foods cannery, he attended San Jose public schools and San Jose City College. In 2011, he received a Bachelor of Science in political science from San José State University.

While a student at San Jose City College, Torres worked for the San José Unified School District as an instructional associate and the Children's Discovery Museum of San Jose as a van driver. He was a community organizer for the City of San Jose before becoming executive director of Santa Maria Urban Ministry in 2012. He later became deputy chief of staff to San Jose city councilwoman Magdalena Carrasco in 2015, a job he held until taking a business management role at the San Jose Downtown Association in 2021.

== Political career ==
Torres was elected to the Franklin-McKinley School District Board of Trustees in 2014 and served one term. In 2015, he became a regional director for the California Democratic Party, a position he held until 2023. He was later elected to the San José-Evergreen Community College District Board of Trustees in 2020 and served until his election to the San Jose City Council in 2022.

=== San Jose City Council ===
San Jose city councilmember Raul Peralez, who was term limited, ran for mayor in the 2022 election and came in fourth place. Torres ran to replace Peralez and won, becoming the city's second openly gay and first openly gay Latino councilmember. Torres said his priorities were homelessness, public safety, and downtown revitalization. He was often considered a progressive, labor-friendly councilmember.

Following the launch of a criminal investigation into Torres related to child sex crimes, Torres stopped attending public meetings related to his duties as a city councilmember. As a result, the San Jose City Council voted to strip Torres of all committee and board assignments on October 22, 2024. Facing calls to resign, Torres resigned from the city council on November 5, 2024, hours before he was arrested. His resignation took effect on November 27, 2024.

== Criminal conviction ==
On October 3, 2024, the San Jose Police Department served Torres with a search warrant as part of a criminal investigation. The warrant was served on suspicion of Torres possessing child sex abuse materials and engaging in relationships with minors. Torres had sent images and messages regarding minors while visiting Chicago for the 2024 Democratic National Convention to 21-year-old Terry Beeks, who later attempted to extort Torres. Torres also sexually molested his younger cousin multiple times between 1990 and 1999. According to court documents, Torres "orally copulated [the victim] and then had the victim try to have anal sex with [Torres]. The victim was unable to have anal sex with [Torres] so [Torres] sodomized the victim." Torres admitted to sodomizing his cousin during a recorded phone conversation shared with police, during which Torres also alleged that he is also a victim of child sexual abuse. Prior to his arrest, Torres denied all allegations and referred to himself as "the victim in this matter".

The Santa Clara County District Attorney's Office submitted a criminal complaint against Torres on November 5, 2024, leading to his arrest later that day. Torres was charged with one count of lewd and lascivious acts against a minor and one count each of sodomy and oral copulation by force, violence, duress, menace or fear. While he originally pled not guilty, he later changed his plea to no contest and was convicted on all three counts on April 8, 2025. On August 29, 2025, Torres was sentenced to 18 years in state prison and is required to register as a sex offender for the rest of his life. He began his sentence at Wasco State Prison on September 17, 2025, and is not eligible for parole until January 2037. As of March 2026, Torres is incarcerated at California State Prison, Los Angeles County.
