= Spy video car =

Type of RC car

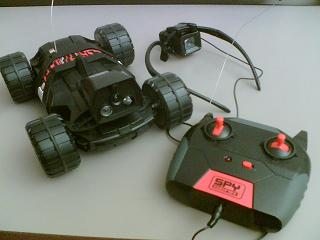
Spy video car created by Wild Planet

A spy video car is a hybrid product created by mixing a traditional RC car and a video baby monitor. The remote controller communicates digital command via the 49 MHz frequency to the car for control, and the camera on the car transmits video via the 2.4 GHz frequency to the remote controller for display. Because both directions use different radio frequency, they do not interfere with each other. The single-lensed display with a zoom lens produces a bigger virtual image in front of the operator, creating a first-person point of view feel for the driver.

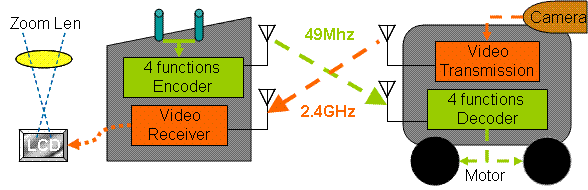

Wild Planet launched it for the 2006 Christmas season. It may be the first RC toy with built-in camera in the US market, and it also received the 2007 T.O.T.Y (Toy of The Year) award at the American International Toy Fair.

== Technical details ==
=== Video system ===
Inside the car body is a transmitting RF module (Richwave "RW67TX-NA03") and a black-and-white camera module (based around the OmniVison OV5116 IC). Similarly, the remote control unit contains a corresponding video receiver (Richwave "RW67RX-NA03") and a 3.5 mm phono jack which carries the video signal to the headset. The headset is based around the Kopin CyberDisplay 300M LV LCD and A300 controller IC. It contains simple optics and a diffused, white LED backlight. All of the components run on a 9v DC source (each has its own voltage regulator), and the Rx/Tx set operates on the 2.4 GHz range.

=== Vehicular system ===
The radio and motor-control circuits are similar to those commonly used in other radio-controlled toys. The radio set operates in the 27/49 MHz range, with non-proportional control over steering and forward-and-reverse movement. The motors and gearboxes used to propel and steer the car are fairly typical of RC toys, though they have been designed for quiet operation rather than speed or power, allowing the vehicle to run almost silently.

CarPCBFront	CarPCBBack	CameraPCB

RemotePCBFront	RemotePCBBack
