= Franklin-McKinley School District =

School district in California, United States

Address
- 645 Wool Creek Drive San Jose, California, 95112; United States

District information
- Type: Public
- Grades: K–8
- Superintendent: Juan Cruz
- NCES District ID: 0614370

Students and staff
- Students: 6,611 (2020–2021)
- Teachers: 317.7 (FTE)
- Staff: 355.59 (FTE)
- Student–teacher ratio: 20.81:1

Other information
- Website: www.fmsd.org

The Franklin-McKinley School District is composed of 14 elementary schools, 3 middle schools, and 3 charter schools in San Jose, California, USA.

== Elementary Schools ==
- Captain Jason M. Dahl Elementary School
- Franklin Elementary School
- George Shirakawa Sr. Elementary School
- G.W. Hellyer Elementary School
- McKinley Elementary School
- Meadows (Jeanne R.) Elementary School
- Ramblewood Elementary School
- R.F. Kennedy Elementary School
- Santee Elementary School
- Stonegate Elementary School

== Middle Schools ==
- Bridges Academy
- Sylvandale Middle School
- College Connection Academy

== Charter Schools ==
- Lairon College Preparatory Academy
- Los Arboles Literacy & Technology Academy
- Los Arboles Literacy & Technology Academy
