= Maya Esparza =

American politician

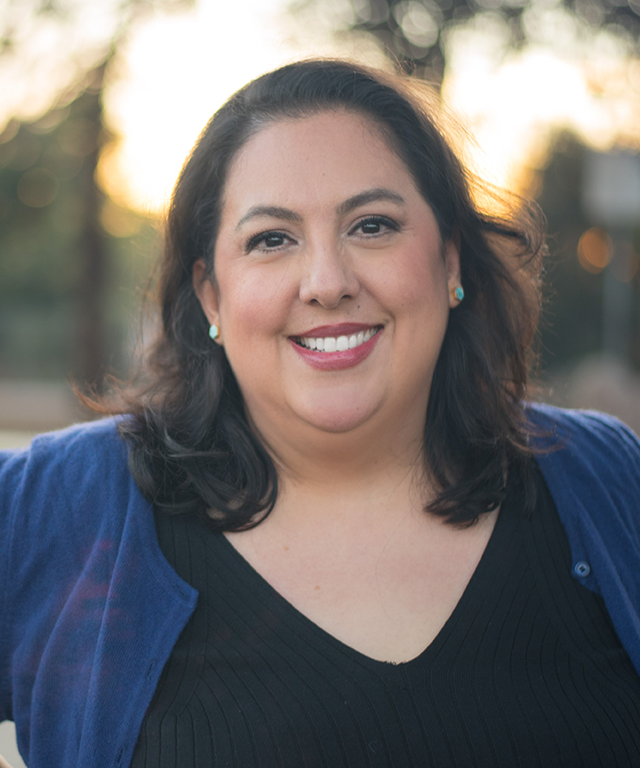
Esparza in 2019

Maya Esparza was a member on the San Jose City Council from 2019 to 2022, representing the 7th district. Esparza ran for reelection in 2022, but lost to Bien Doan in the runoff.
