= Winchester, San Jose =

Winchester
- Neighborhood of San Jose
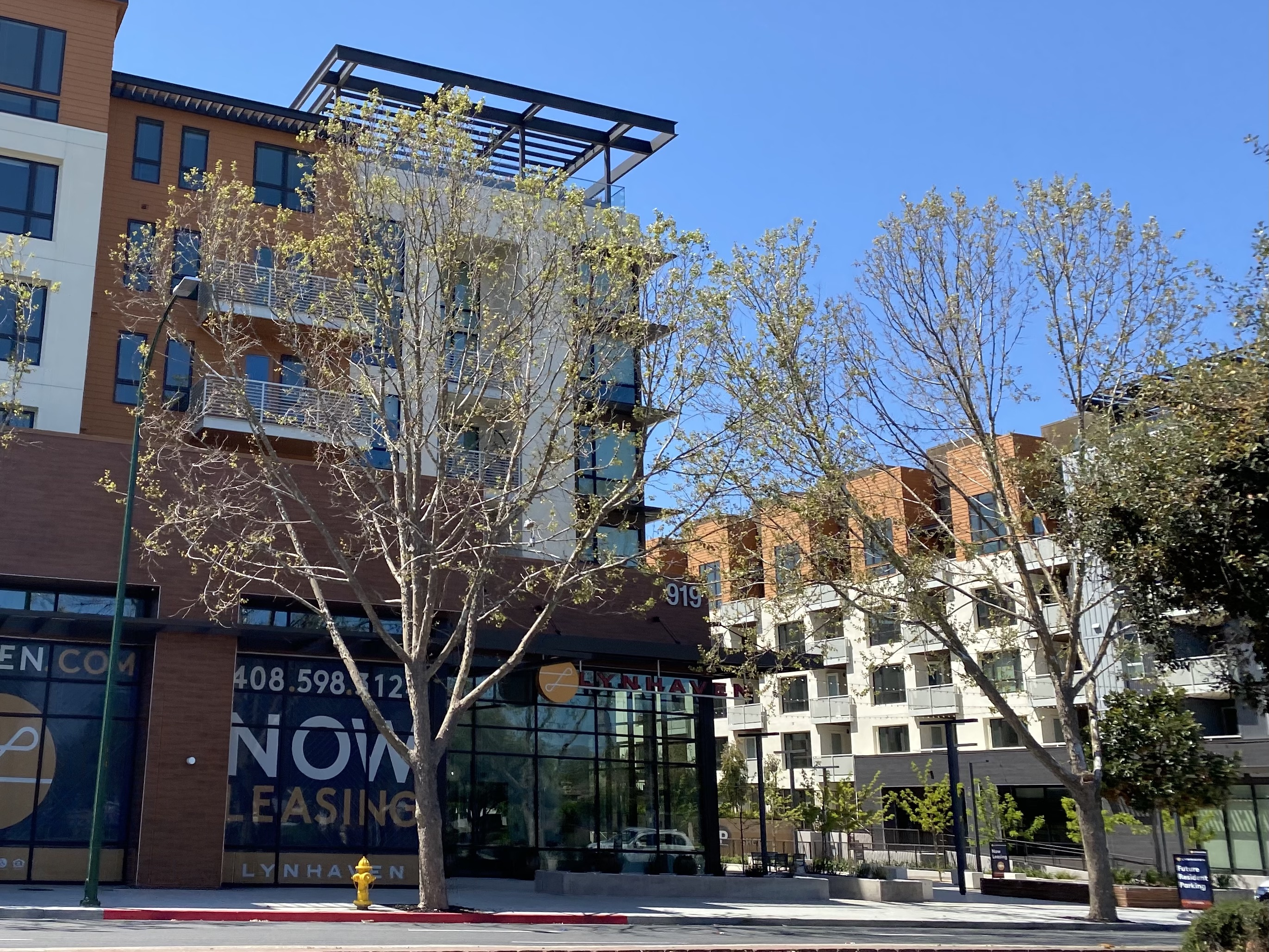

- Location within San Jose
- Coordinates: 37.309067°N 121.950173°W
- Country: United States
- State: California
- County: Santa Clara
- City: San Jose

Winchester is a neighborhood of San Jose, California, located in West San Jose.

== History ==
Winchester gains its name from early resident Sarah Lockwood Winchester, a Connecticut native and heiress to fifty percent ownership of the Winchester Repeating Arms Company, who built the famous Winchester Mystery House nearby.

== Geography ==
Winchester is bound to the west by the San Tomas Expressway and to the east by CA Highway 17. Its northern boundary is formed by the Junípero Serra Freeway (CA 280), while it borders the city of Campbell to its south, roughly just north of Hamilton Avenue.
