= Linda J. LeZotte =

American politician (born 1949)

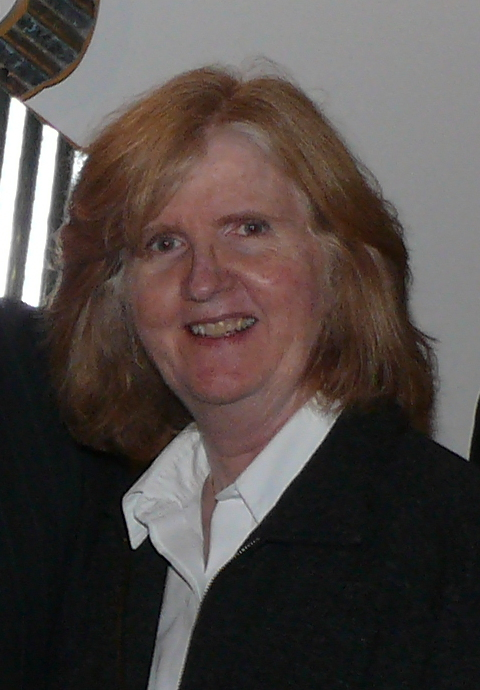

Member of San Jose City Council from the 1st district
- In office 1998–2006
- Preceded by: Trixie Johnson
- Succeeded by: Pete Constant

Personal details
- Born: Linda Joan LeZotte; February 24, 1949 (age 77) Jackson Heights, New York
- Party: Democratic
- Education: Foothill College (AA); San Jose State University (BSBA); Lincoln University (JD); Golden Gate University (LLM)
- Profession: Attorney

Linda Joan LeZotte (born February 24, 1949) is an American politician from San Jose, California. She served on the San Jose City Council, representing District 1 (West San Jose) from 1999 to 2007. She is an attorney and former member of the San Jose Planning Commission (1992-1998). She lost to City Councilmember Ken Yeager in the 2006 race for a seat on the Santa Clara County Board of Supervisors. From 1999 to 2015 she practiced law with her own law firm and during that period she served as counsel for Berliner Cohen in San Jose.

In 2010, LeZotte won a seat on the board of the Santa Clara Valley Water District and was re-elected in 2014 and 2018. She was elected as vice chair of the board in 2011 and 2018, and chair of the board in 2012 and 2019.

== Early life and education ==
LeZotte moved to the South Bay with her family in 1966. She attended Foothill College and then San Jose State University. She graduated with a Bachelor of Science degree in Business Administration and Bachelor of Arts degree in Behavioral Science in 1973.

LeZotte received her JD from Lincoln University School of Law in San Francisco and was admitted to the California State Bar in 1980. She received a Masters degree in tax law in 1983 from Golden Gate University School of Law.
