= Washington-Guadalupe, San Jose =

Washington-Guadalupe
- Neighborhood of San Jose
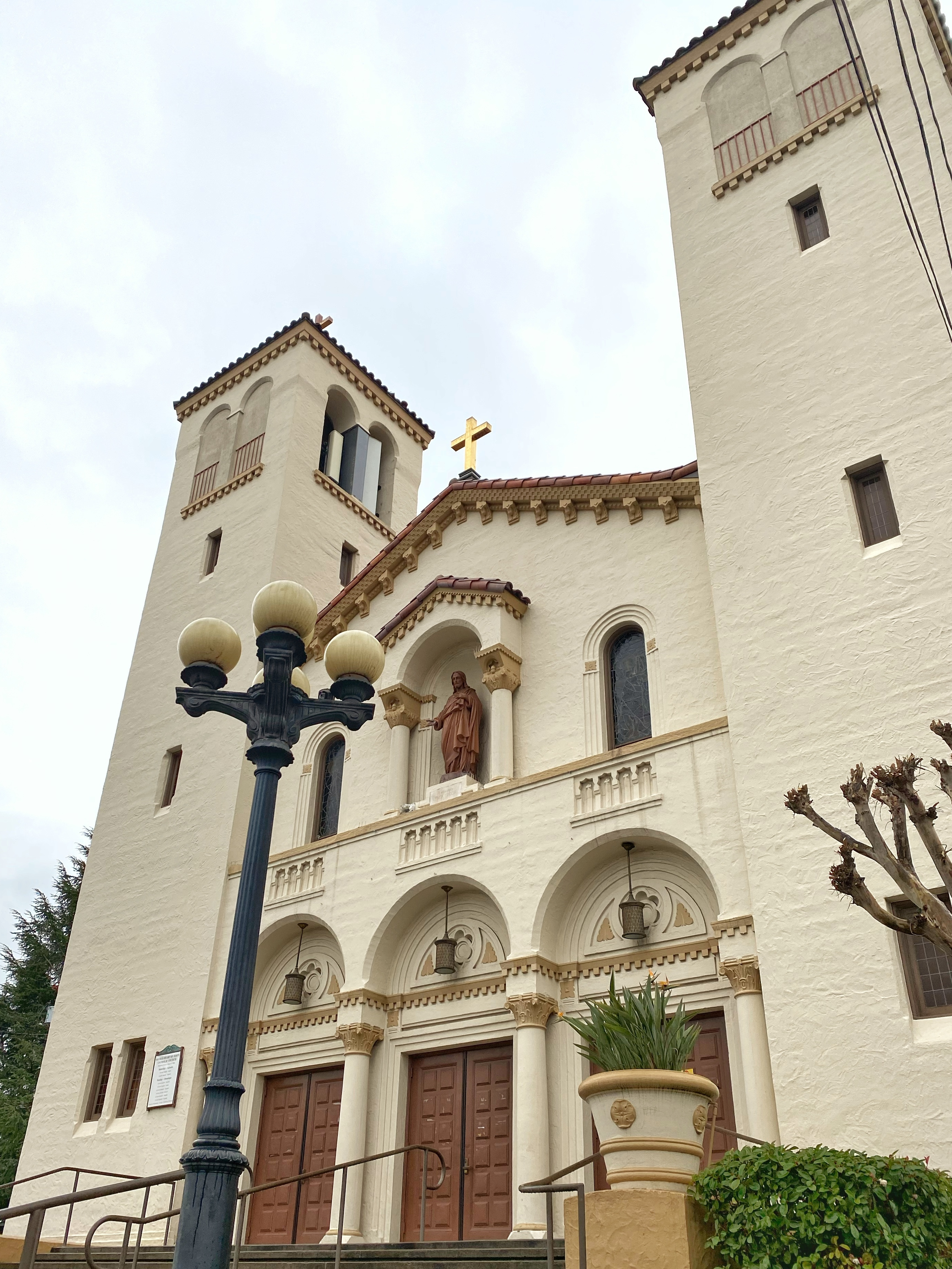
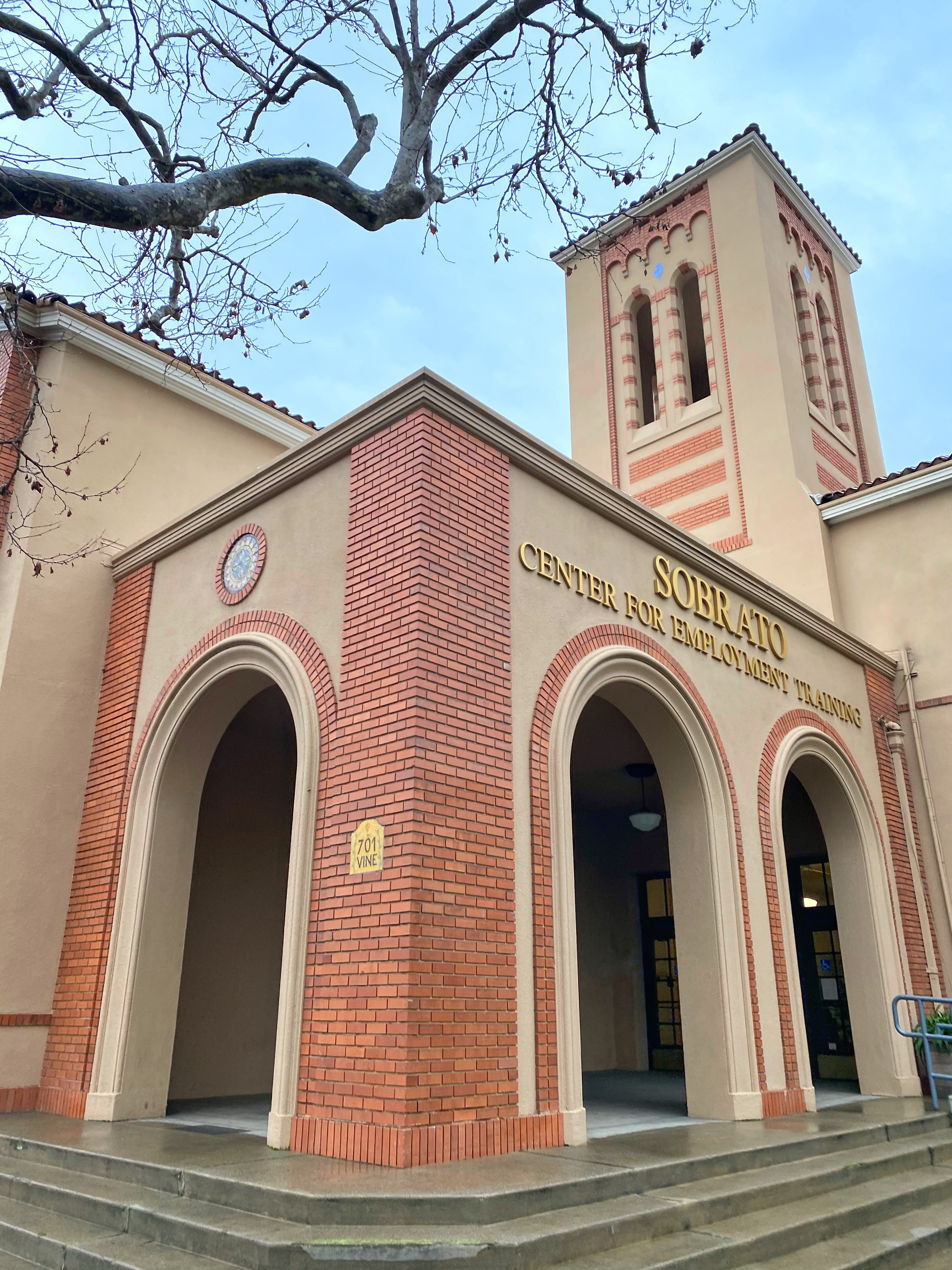
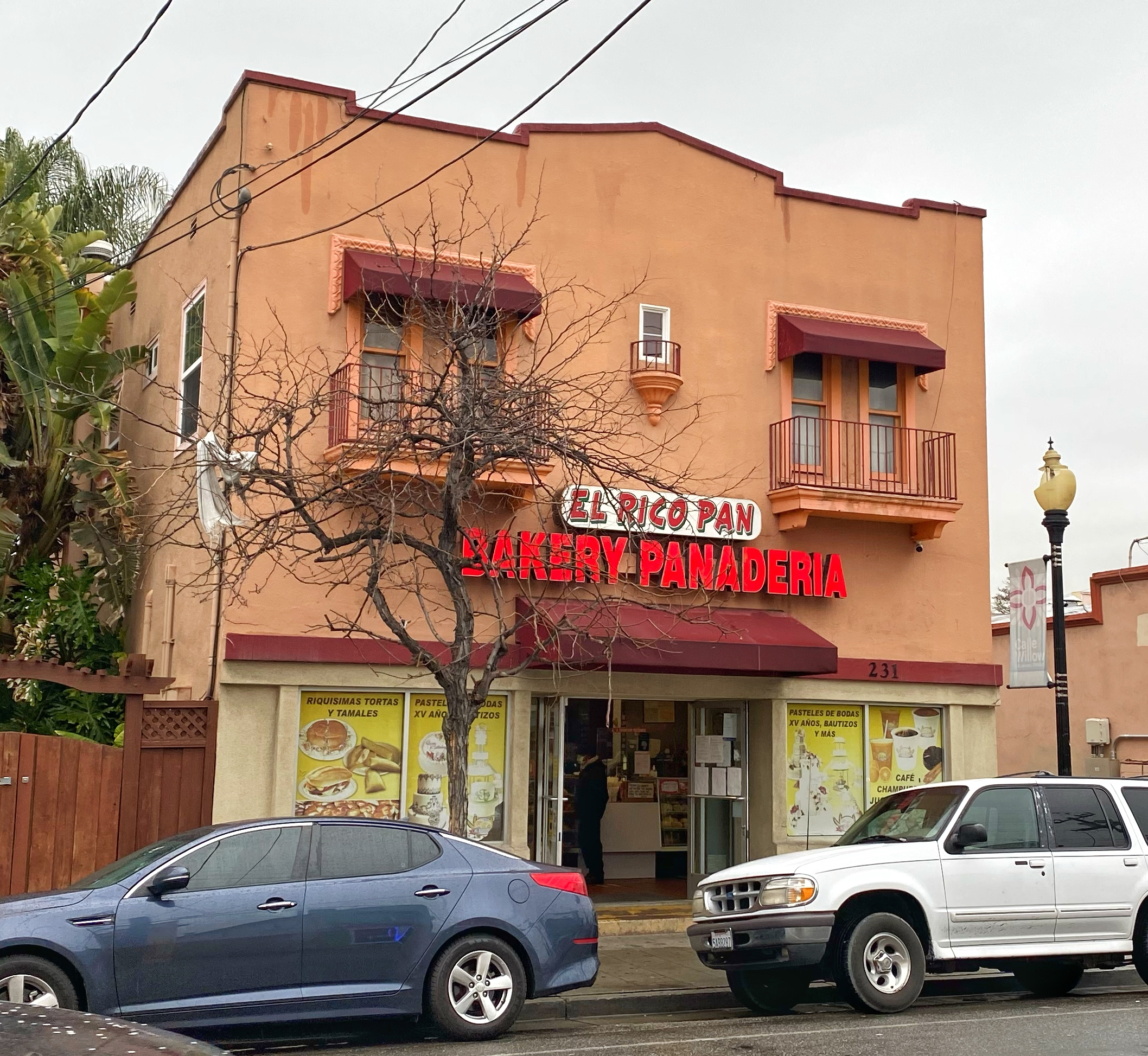
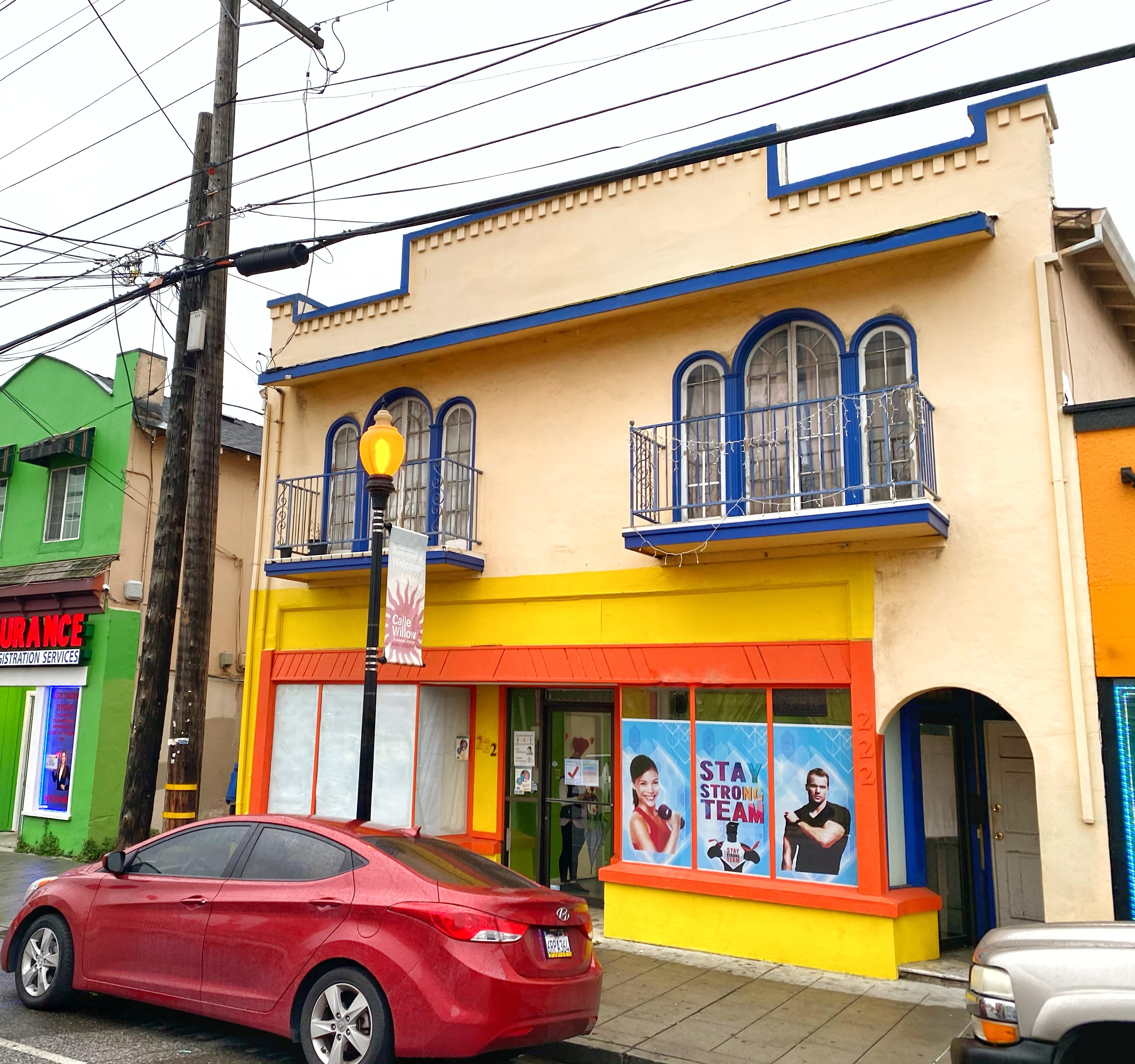
- Top: Sacred Heart Catholic Church; Sobrato Center; bottom: Calle Willow.

- Location within San Jose
- Coordinates: 37.321474°N 121.887468°W
- Country: United States
- State: California
- County: Santa Clara
- City: San Jose

Washington-Guadalupe is a neighborhood of central San Jose, California, located just south of Downtown San Jose. It is one of San Jose's most historic Chicano/Mexican-American districts. The area is a designated historic conservation district. The portion of Willow Street that passes through the district makes up the Calle Willow business district, made up primarily of Spanish-speaking businesses.

== History ==
The Sacred Heart of Jesus Parish Church was built in 1920, in a Spanish Revival architecture style.

Washington-Guadalupe is designated by the city as a historic conservation area, owing to the high number of historic 19th and early 20th century architecture.

== Geography ==
Washington-Guadalupe is located in Central San Jose, just south of Downtown San Jose.

The Guadalupe River Park goes along the western border of the neighborhood. Plaza Brenda López is located within the district.

== Landmarks ==
- Sacred Heart Catholic Church
- Sobrato Center
