= Wireless security camera =

Wireless transmitting security cameras

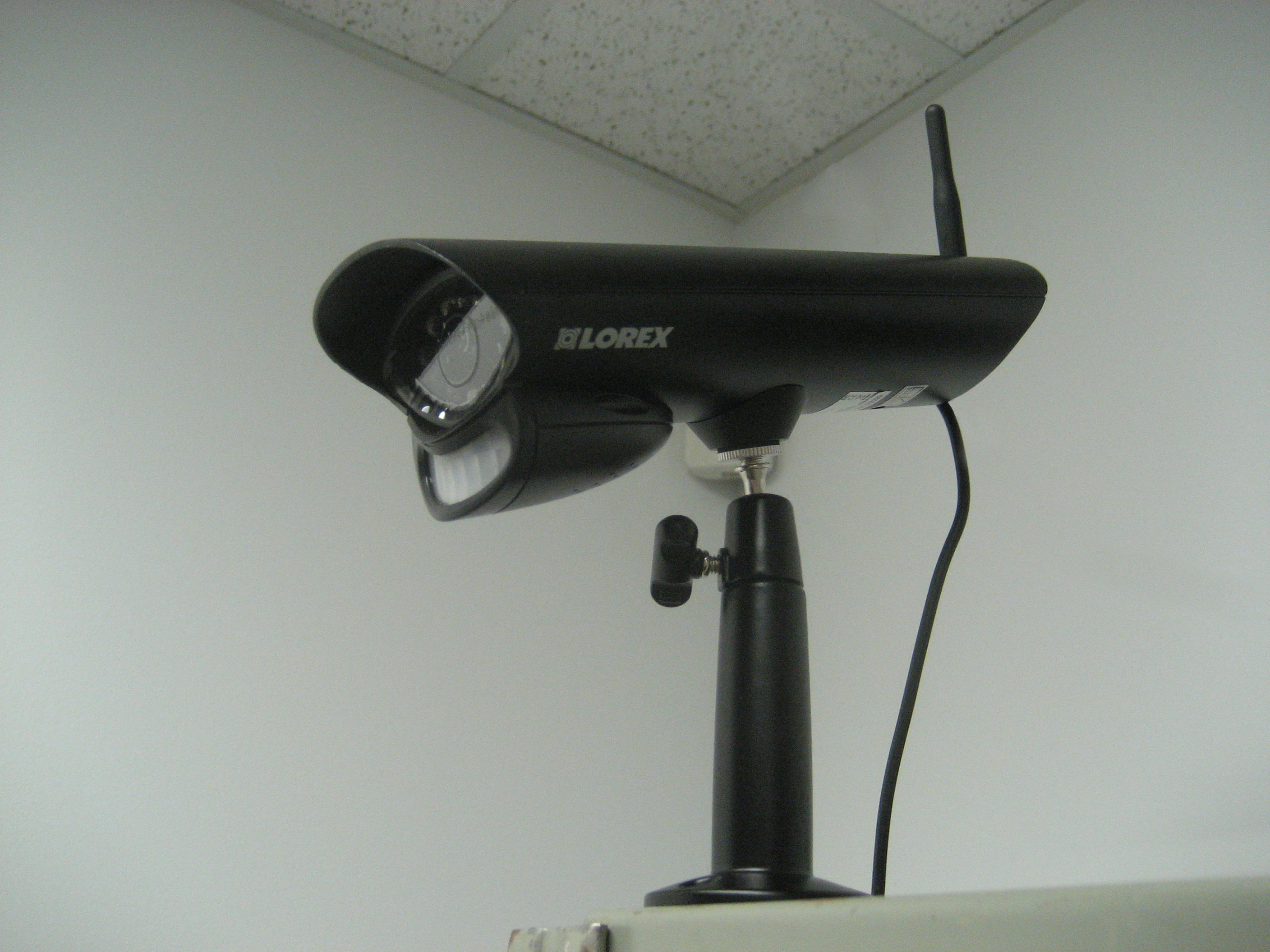
Digital wireless camera

Wireless security cameras are closed-circuit television (CCTV) cameras that transmit a video and audio signal to a wireless receiver through a radio band. Many wireless security cameras require at least one cable or wire for power; "wireless" refers to the transmission of video/audio. However, some wireless security cameras are battery-powered, making the cameras truly wireless from top to bottom.

Wireless cameras are proving very popular among modern security consumers due to their low installation costs (there is no need to run expensive video extension cables) and flexible mounting options; wireless cameras can be mounted/installed in locations previously unavailable to standard wired cameras. In addition to the ease of use and convenience of access, wireless security camera allows users to leverage broadband wireless internet to provide seamless video streaming over-internet.

== Types ==
=== Analog wireless ===
Analog wireless is the transmission of audio and video signals using radio frequencies. Typically, analog wireless has a transmission range of around 300 feet (91 meters) in open space; walls, doors, and furniture will reduce this range.

Analog wireless is found in three frequencies: 900 MHz, 2.4 GHz, and 5.8 GHz. Currently, the majority of wireless security cameras operate on the 2.4 GHz frequency. Most household routers, cordless phones, video game controllers, and microwaves operate on the 2.4 GHz frequency and may cause interference with a wireless security camera. The main difference between 2.4 and 5 GHz frequencies is range. 900 MHz is known for its ability to penetrate through barriers like walls and vegetation.

==== Advantages ====
- Cost effective: the cost of individual cameras is low
- Multiple receivers per camera: the signal from one camera can be picked up by any receiver; you can have multiple receivers in various locations to create your wireless surveillance network

==== Disadvantages ====
- Susceptible to interference from other household devices, such as microwaves, cordless phones, video game controllers, and routers.
- No signal strength indicator: there is no visual alert (like the bars on a cellular phone) indicating the strength of your signal.
- Susceptible to interception: because analog wireless uses a consistent frequency, it is possible for the signals to be picked up by other receivers.
- One-way communication only: it is not possible for the receiver to send signals back to the camera.

=== Digital wireless cameras ===
Digital wireless is the transmission of audio and video analog signals encoded as digital packets over high-bandwidth radio frequencies.

==== Advantages ====
- Wide transmission range—usually close to 450 feet (open space, clear line of sight between camera and receiver)
- High quality video and audio
- Two-way communication between the camera and the receiver
- Digital signal means you can transmit commands and functions, such as turning lights on and off
- You can connect multiple receivers to one recording device, such as security DVR

== Uses and applications ==
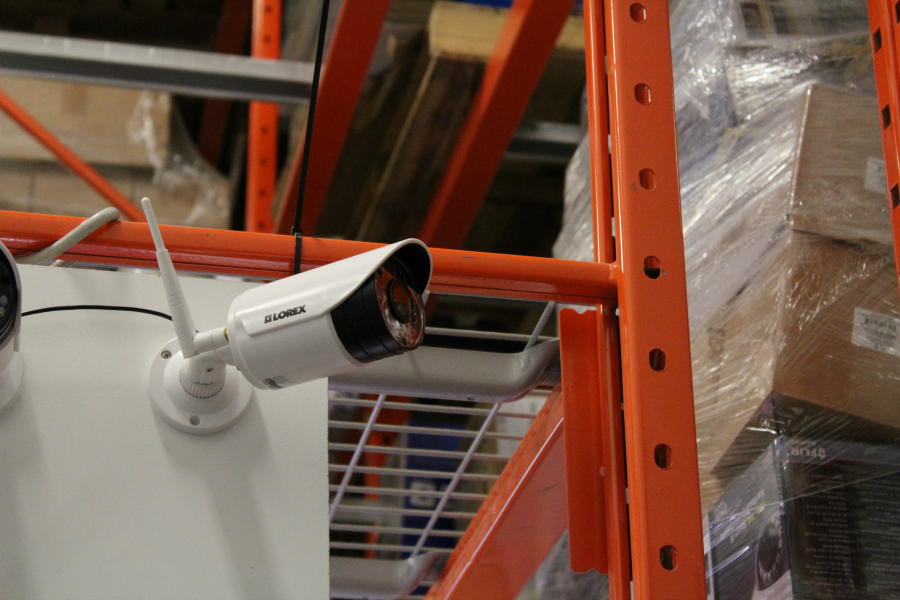
Wireless Security Cameras in a Warehouse.

=== Home security systems ===
Wireless security cameras are becoming more and more popular in the consumer market, being a cost-effective way to have a comprehensive surveillance system installed in a home or business for an often less expensive price. Wireless cameras are also ideal for people renting homes or apartments. Since there is no need to run video extension cables through walls or ceilings (from the camera to the receiver or recording device) one does not need approval of a landlord to install a wireless security camera system. Additionally, the lack of wiring allows for less mess, avoiding damage to the look of a building.

A wireless security camera is also a great option for seasonal monitoring and surveillance. For example, one can observe a pool or patio.

=== Barn Cameras ===
Wireless cameras are also very useful for monitoring outbuildings as wireless signals can be sent from one building to another where it is not possible to run wires due to roads or other obstructions. One common use of these is for watching animals in a barn from a house located on the same property. One such example of this can be seen in this story of one of the first "BarnCam" in the New York Times.

=== Law enforcement ===
Wireless security cameras are also used by law enforcement agencies to deter crimes. The cameras can be installed in many remote locations and the video data is transmitted through government-only wireless network. An example of this application is the deployment of hundreds of wireless security cameras by New York City Police Department on lamp posts at many streets throughout the city.

== Wireless range ==
Wireless security cameras function best when there is a clear line of sight between the camera(s) and the receiver. If digital wireless cameras are outdoors and have a clear line of sight, they typically have a range between 250 and 450 feet. If located indoors, the range can be limited to 100 to 150 feet. Cubical walls, drywall, glass, and windows generally do not degrade wireless signal strength. Brick, concrete floors, and walls degrade signal strength. Trees that are in the line of sight of the wireless camera and receiver may also impact signal strength.

The signal range also depends on whether there are competing signals using the same frequency as the camera. For example, signals from cordless phones or routers may affect signal strength. When this happens, the camera image may freeze, or appear "choppy". Typically, the solution is to lock the channel that the wireless router operates on.

== See also ==
- Dashcam
- Spy Camera
