= Judy Chirco =

American politician

Member of San Jose City Council from District 9
- In office 2003–2010
- Succeeded by: Donald Rocha

Personal details
- Political party: Democratic
- Profession: Councilmember / School Board Member

Judy Chirco is an American politician from California, previously serving on the San Jose, California City Council, representing District 9. She was named Vice Mayor by the San Jose City Council to replace David Cortese.

== Personal information ==
Chirco has been a resident of San Jose, California for 40 years. In March 2002, she was elected.

== Education ==
Judy graduated from Camden High School and went on to receive her Bachelor of Science in Social Science degree from San Jose State University and graduated in 1994.

== Family ==
Judy is married to her husband Ed and together they manage property in San Jose and other areas. Ed has been an active member in the community as has been a coach for the Cambrian Little League for the past twenty years and a board member of the Cambrian Community Council for the last ten years. Ed and Judy have two sons: Steve and Matt.
