= Pete Constant =

American politician

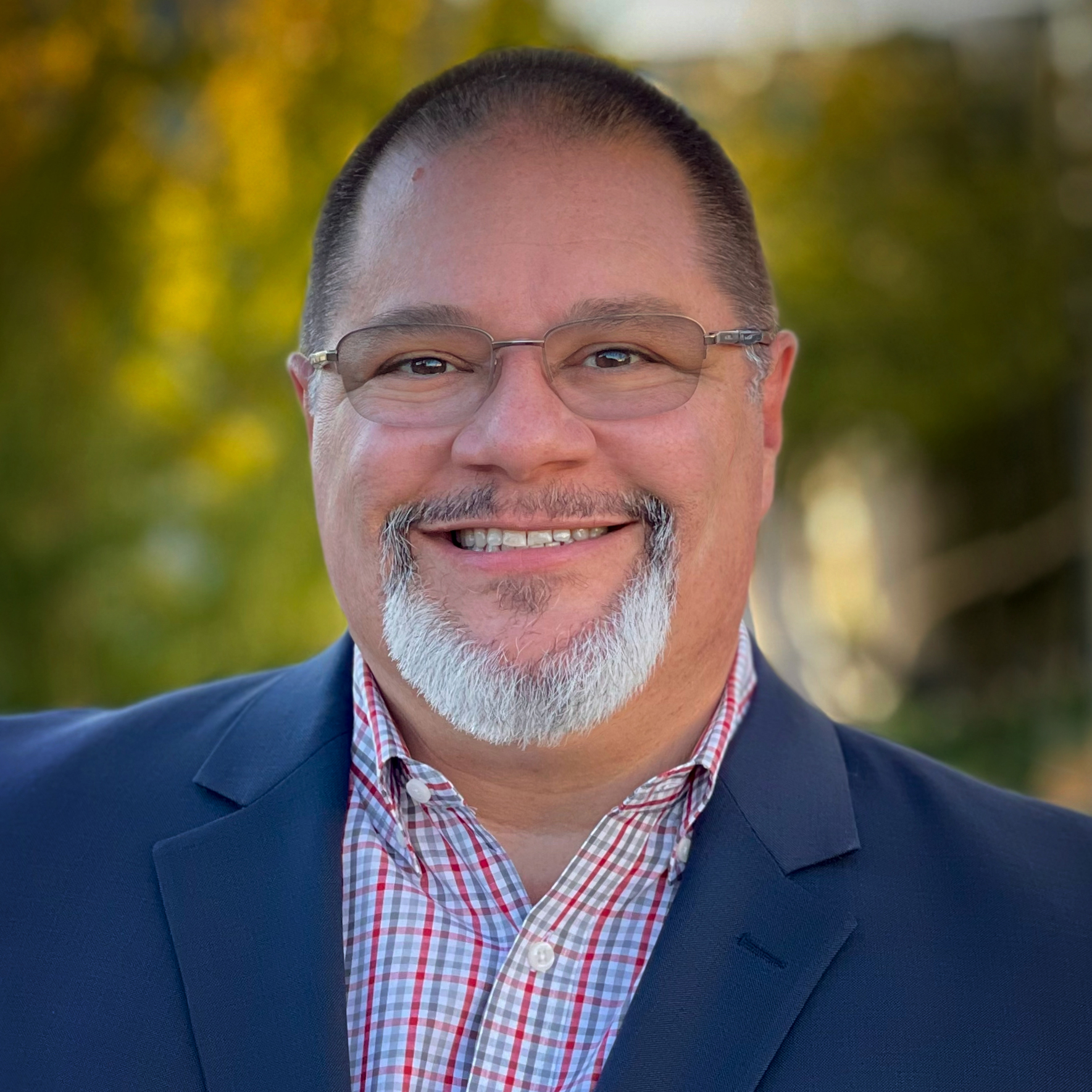

San Jose City Council; Roseville Joint Union High School District
- In office 2007–2014
- Preceded by: Linda J. LeZotte
- Succeeded by: Charles "Chappie" Jones

Personal details
- Born: October 22, 1963 (age 62) Dearborn, Michigan
- Party: Republican
- Spouse: Julie Constant
- Children: Alexandra Constant, Amanda Constant, Peter Constant, Jr., Samantha Constant, Sydney Constant
- Profession: Professor / Photographer / Former Police Officer /

Pete Constant (born October 22, 1963) is an American politician from California, formerly a councilmember for District 1 of the San Jose, California city council. Constant is a former San Jose police officer (1989–2000) and has owned several photography businesses. He was elected to the city council during the June 2006 primary election and was inaugurated in January 2007.

== Education ==
Constant attended Blackford High School in San Jose and received his bachelor's degree in management from Saint Mary's College of California, followed by a master's degree in leadership from St. Mary's College of California.

== Political contests ==
Constant was elected June 6, 2006 with more than 64% of the vote. He replaced council member Linda LeZotte, who had served eight years before being term-limited in 2006. Constant was reelected in June 2010 with 66% of the vote in a three-way contest. His second term on the council ended in January 2015.

== City council ==
During his time in office, Constant took an activist role as the sole conservative on the council. His positions that attracted media attention included his proposal to prevent access to online pornography on computers at San Jose public libraries in 2007 and his vote against the citywide plastic-bag ban in late 2010.
