= San Jose City Council =

Governing body of San Jose, California, U.S.

San José City Council

Type
- Type: Unicameral
- Term limits: Two terms

Leadership
- Mayor: Matt Mahan, Democrat since January 1, 2023
- Vice Mayor: Pam Foley, Democrat since January 1, 2025

Structure
- Seats: 11 (10 city councilmembers with the mayor presiding with voting rights)
- Political groups: Democratic (8); Independent (3)
- Committees: List: Community and Economic Development Committee Neighborhood Services and Education Committee Public Safety, Finance and Strategic Support Committee Rules and Open Government Committee Transportation and Environment Committee
- Length of term: 4 years

Elections
- Voting system: Nonpartisan blanket primary with run-off if no majority Ten Electoral districts Mayor elected At-Large
- Last election: June 24, 2025 (District 3 special election runoff)
- Next election: June 2, 2026

Meeting place
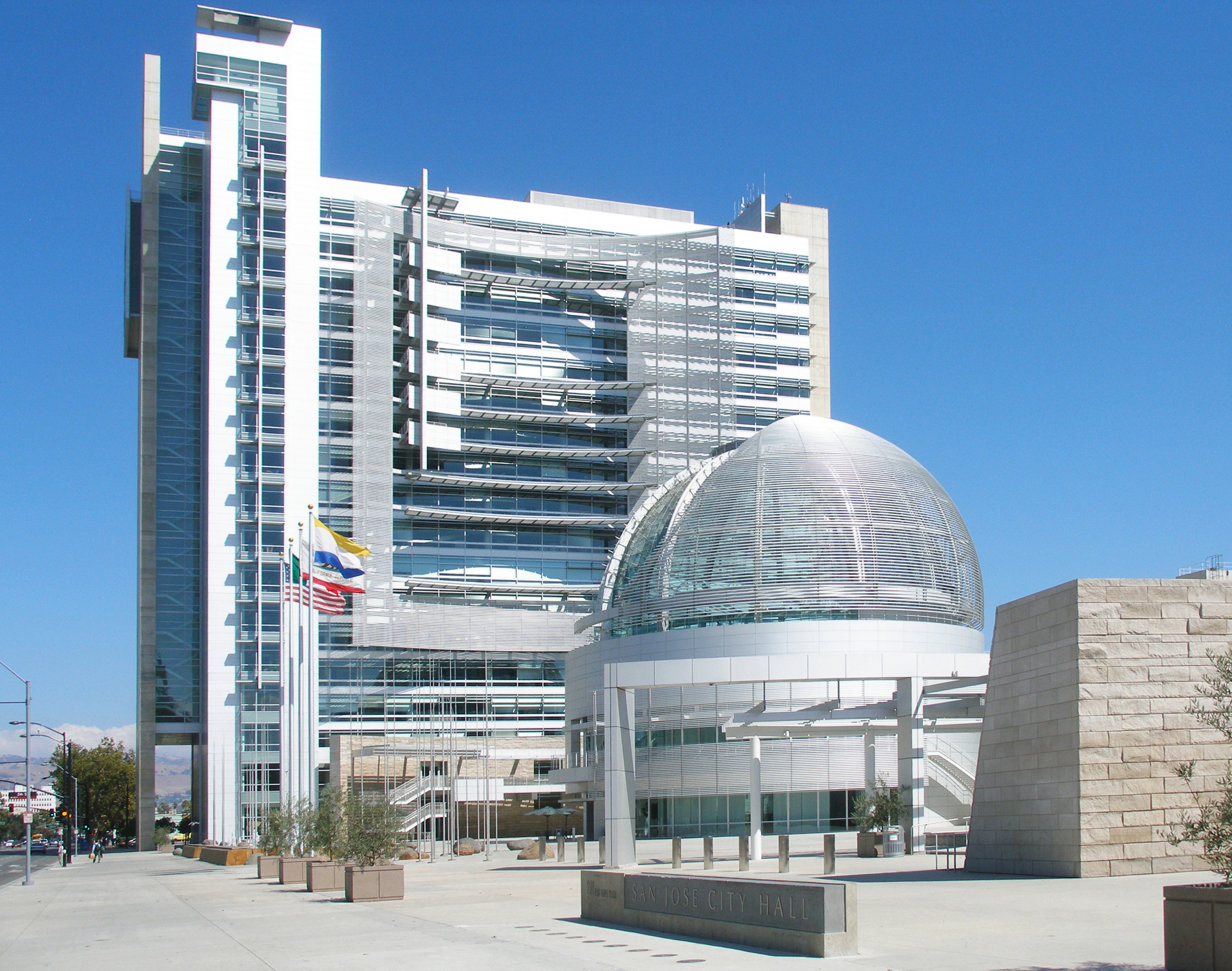
- San Jose City Hall; San Jose, California

Website
- Council Website

The San Jose City Council, officially San José City Council, is the legislature of the Government of the City of San José, California.

As the Mayor of San Jose, Matt Mahan casts the 11th vote on matters before the council and acts as chair of the council during most meetings. Vice Mayor Pam Foley conducts Council meetings in the absence of the Mayor.

== Current councilmembers ==
District	Member	Areas represented	Party (Note: Local offices in California are officially non-partisan.)	First elected
Mayor	Matt Mahan	City Wide	Democratic	2022
1	Rosemary Kamei	West San Jose including Winchester	Democratic	2022
2	Pamela Campos	South San Jose including Coyote Valley, Edenvale and Santa Teresa	Democratic	2024
3	Anthony Tordillos	Central San Jose including Downtown San Jose, Japantown, Little Portugal, Luna Park and Naglee Park	Democratic	2025
4	David Cohen	North San Jose including Alviso and Berryessa	Democratic	2020
5	Peter Ortiz	East San Jose including Alum Rock, East Foothills and King and Story	Democratic	2022
6	Michael Mulcahy	Central San Jose including The Alameda, Buena Vista, Burbank, Rose Garden, West San Carlos and Willow Glen	Independent	2024
7	Bien Doan	Central San Jose including Communications Hill and Seven Trees	Independent	2022
8	Domingo Candelas	Southeast San Jose including Evergreen, Meadowfair and Silver Creek Valley	Democratic	2024 (Note: Appointed in 2023 on an interim basis to fill a vacancy; subsequently elected to a full term.)
9 (Vice Mayor)	Pam Foley	South San Jose including Cambrian Park	Democratic	2018
10	George Casey	South San Jose including Almaden Valley and Blossom Valley	Independent	2024

== Elections ==
All elections are officially non-partisan and candidates' political parties are not shown on ballots.

=== 2022 ===
2022 San Jose City Council District 1 election
Candidate	Votes	%
Rosemary Kamei	9,943	65.69
Ramona Arellano Snyder	3,913	25.85
Tim Gildersleeve	1,280	8.46
Total votes	15,136	100.00

2022 San Jose City Council District 3 election
Candidate	Votes	%
Omar Torres	11,632	65.62
Irene Smith	6,095	34.38
Total votes	17,727	100.00

2022 San Jose City Council District 5 election
Candidate	Votes	%
Peter Ortiz	9,055	54.80
Nora Campos	7,468	45.20
Total votes	16,523	100.00

2022 San Jose City Council District 7 election
Candidate	Votes	%
Bien Doan	9,146	53.79
Maya Esparza (incumbent)	7,858	46.21
Total votes	17,004	100.00

=== 2020 ===
2020 San Jose City Council District 2 election
Candidate	Votes	%
Sergio Jimenez (incumbent)	12,891	58.82
Jonathan Fleming	9,139	41.48
Total votes	22,030	100.00

2020 San Jose City Council District 4 election
Candidate	Votes	%
David Cohen	7,417	36.48
Lan Diep (incumbent)	6,756	33.23
Huy Tran	4,740	23.32
Jamal Khan	1,417	6.97
Total votes	20,330	100.00

2020 San Jose City Council District 4 run-off election
Candidate	Votes	%
David Cohen	20,030	51.33
Lan Diep (incumbent)	18,993	48.67
Total votes	39,023	100.00

2020 San Jose City Council District 6 election
Candidate	Votes	%
Devora 'Dev' Davis (incumbent)	13,175	48.37
Jake Tonkel	7,596	27.89
Ruben Navarro	4,557	16.73
Marshall Woodmansee	1,910	7.01
Total votes	27,238	100.00

2020 San Jose City Council District 6 run-off election
Candidate	Votes	%
Devora 'Dev' Davis	24,340	53.87
Jake Tonkel	20,840	46.13
Total votes	45,180	100.00

2020 San Jose City Council District 8 election
Candidate	Votes	%
Sylvia Arenas (incumbent)	13,886	60.58
Jim Zito	9,035	39.42
Total votes	22,921	100.00

2020 San Jose City Council District 10 election
Candidate	Votes	%
Matt Mahan	15,387	58.54
Helen P. Wang	5,865	22.31
Jenny Higgins Bradanini	5,031	19.14
Total votes	26,283	100.00
