= San Jose State Spartans men's basketball statistical leaders =

The San Jose State Spartans men's basketball statistical leaders are individual statistical leaders of the San Jose State Spartans men's basketball program in various categories, including points, assists, blocks, rebounds, and steals. Within those areas, the lists identify single-game, single-season, and career leaders. The Spartans represent San José State University in the NCAA's Mountain West Conference.

San Jose State Spartans began competing in intercollegiate basketball in 1909. However, the school's record book does not generally list records from before the 1950s, as records from before this period are often incomplete and inconsistent. Since scoring was much lower in this era, and teams played much fewer games during a typical season, it is likely that few or no players from this era would appear on these lists anyway.

The NCAA did not officially record assists as a stat until the 1983–84 season, and blocks and steals until the 1985–86 season, but San Jose State's record books includes players in these stats before these seasons. These lists are updated through the end of the 2023–24 season.

== Scoring ==
Career
Rk	Player	Points	Seasons
1	Ricky Berry	1,767	1985–86 1986–87 1987–88
2	Adrian Oliver	1,750	2008–09 2009–10 2010–11
3	Stu Inman	1,504	1947–48 1948–49 1949–50
4	Wally Rank	1,432	1976–77 1977–78 1978–79 1979–80
5	Omari Moore	1,312	2019–20 2020–21 2021–22 2022–23
6	Justin Graham	1,272	2007–08 2008–09 2009–10 2010–11
7	Ryan Welage	1,258	2015–16 2016–17 2017–18
8	Chris McNealy	1,236	1980–81 1981–82 1982–83
9	Coby Dietrick	1,173	1967–68 1968–69 1969–70
10	Terry Cannon	1,139	1989–90 1990–91 1991–92 1993–94

Season
Rk	Player	Points	Season
1	Adrian Oliver	743	2010–11
2	Ricky Berry	702	1987–88
3	Adrian Oliver	699	2009–10
4	Olivier Saint-Jean	619	1996–97
5	Omari Moore	608	2022–23
6	Colby Garland	589	2025–26
7	Marquin Chandler	569	2004–05
8	Ricky Berry	546	1986–87
9	Ryan Welage	542	2017–18
10	Chris McNealy	541	1982–83

Single game
Rk	Player	Points	Season	Opponent
1	Adrian Oliver	42	2010–11	Puget Sound
2	Wally Rank	40	1979–80	Sacramento State
3	Adrian Oliver	39	2009–10	Louisiana Tech
4	Richard Washington	38	2020–21	Fresno Pacific
5	Seneca Knight	37	2019–20	Colorado State
	Ryan Welage	37	2017–18	Wyoming
	Adrian Oliver	37	2008–09	Boise State
	Olivier Saint-Jean	37	1996–97	Air Force
	Stan Hill	37	1977–78	Sacramento State
10	Brandon Clarke	36	2016–17	Air Force
	Adrian Oliver	36	2010–11	New Mexico State
	Ricky Berry	36	1987–88	Pacific
	Coby Dietrick	36	1969–70	San Diego State

== Rebounds ==
Career
Rk	Player	Rebounds	Seasons
1	Marv Branstrom	864	1955–56 1956–57 1957–58
2	George Clark	857	1949–50 1950–51 1951–52
3	Coby Dietrick	759	1967–68 1968–69 1969–70
4	S.T. Saffold	705	1963–64 1964–65 1965–66
5	Reggie Owens	692	1984–85 1985–86 1986–87
6	Chris McNealy	678	1980–81 1981–82 1982–83
7	Wally Rank	662	1976–77 1977–78 1978–79 1979–80
8	Chris Oakes	661	2007–08 2008–09 2009–10
9	Kevin Logan	608	1989–90 1990–91 1991–92 1992–93
10	Pat Hamm	557	1968–69 1969–70 1970–71

Season
Rk	Player	Rebounds	Season
1	George Clark	376	1951–52
2	Marv Branstrom	370	1956–57
3	Darnell Hillman	327	1968–69
4	George Clark	289	1950–51
5	Fred Niemann	286	1952–53
6	Marv Branstrom	271	1957–58
7	Coby Dietrick	265	1967–68
	Coby Dietrick	265	1969–70
	Wil Carter	265	2010–11
10	Michael Steadman	264	2018–19

Single game
Rk	Player	Rebounds	Season	Opponent
1	Marv Branstrom	28	1956–57	Arizona State
2	George Clark	27	1951–52	Oregon
3	Darnell Hillman	23	1968–69	Nevada-Reno
4	Chris McNealy	22	1982–83	Utah
	Coby Dietrick	22	1967–68	Pepperdine
	Marv Branstrom	22	1957–58	Arizona State
7	Coby Dietrick	21	1969–70	Idaho State
	Darnell Hillman	21	1968–69	Connecticut
	Fred Niemann	21	1952–53	St. Mary's (Calif.)
10	Wil Carter	20	2011–12	Hawaii
	Pat Hamm	20	1969–70	Fresno State

== Assists ==
Career
Rk	Player	Assists	Seasons
1	Justin Graham	508	2007–08 2008–09 2009–10 2010–11
2	Michael Dixon	477	1981–82 1982–83 1983–84 1984–85
3	Ken Mickey	476	1973–74 1975–76 1976–77
4	Mike Mendez	469	1977–78 1978–79 1979–80 1980–81
5	Omari Moore	429	2019–20 2020–21 2021–22 2022–23
6	Alvaro Cardenas	372	2021–22 2022–23 2023–24
7	Marmet Williams	318	1993–94 1994–95 1995–96 1996–97 1997–98
8	Jalen James	274	2013–14 2014–15 2015–16 2016–17 2017–18
9	D.J. Brown	266	2011–12 2012–13 2013–14
	Ricky Berry	266	1985–86 1986–87 1987–88

Season
Rk	Player	Assists	Season
1	Ken Mickey	203	1976–77
2	Alvaro Cardenas	171	2023–24
3	Omari Moore	168	2022–23
4	Mike Mendez	162	1978–79
5	Michael Dixon	155	1983–84
6	Justin Graham	149	2009–10
7	Ken Mickey	145	1975–76
8	Mike Mendez	143	1980–81
9	Justin Graham	142	2008–09

Single game
Rk	Player	Assists	Season	Opponent
1	Ken Mickey	17	1976–77	Illinois State
2	Justin Graham	13	2008–09	Northern Colorado
	Ricky Berry	13	1985–86	Idaho
4	Keith Shamburger	12	2011–12	Hawaii
	Tito Addison	12	1995–96	Nevada
	Mike Mendez	12	1980–81	UC Santa Barbara
	Mike Mendez	12	1978–79	UC Santa Barbara
	Ken Mickey	12	1976–77	Cal State Fullerton
	Ken Mickey	12	1976–77	Long Beach State
	Ken Mickey	12	1975–76	Pacific

== Steals ==
Career
Rk	Player	Steals	Seasons
1	Justin Graham	209	2007–08 2008–09 2009–10 2010–11
2	Isaac Thornton	145	2013–14 2014–15 2015–16 2016–17
3	Tito Addison	125	1994–95 1995–96 1996–97
4	Omari Moore	120	2019–20 2020–21 2021–22 2022–23
5	Mike Mendez	114	1977–78 1978–79 1979–80 1980–81
6	Terry Cannon	113	1989–90 1990–91 1991–92 1993–94
7	Marmet Williams	111	1993–94 1994–95 1995–96 1996–97 1997–98
8	Chris McNealy	109	1980–81 1981–82 1982–83
9	Michael Dixon	106	1981–82 1982–83 1983–84 1984–85

Season
Rk	Player	Steals	Season
1	Justin Graham	73	2010–11
2	Justin Graham	51	2008–09
	Myron (MJ) Amey Jr.	51	2023–24
4	Mike Mendez	47	1980–81
5	DaShawn Wright	46	2007–08
	Tito Addison	46	1995–96
7	Justin Graham	45	2009–10
8	Antonio Lawrence	45	2002–03
9	Chris McNealy	44	1980–81
	Sadaidriene Hall	44	2024–25

Single game
Rk	Player	Steals	Season	Opponent
1	Omari Moore	8	2019–20	New Mexico

== Blocks ==
Career
Rk	Player	Blocks	Seasons
1	Gerald Thomas	127	1983–84 1985–86 1986–87 1987–88
2	Brandon Clarke	116	2015–16 2016–17
3	Chris Oakes	111	2007–08 2008–09 2009–10
4	Omari Moore	90	2019–20 2020–21 2021–22 2022–23
5	Menelik Barbary	87	2005–06 2006–07
6	Chris McNealy	81	1980–81 1981–82 1982–83
7	Ibrahima Diallo	78	2021–22 2022–23
8	Darnell Williams	75	1999–00 2000–01
9	Isaac Thornton	65	2013–14 2014–15 2015–16 2016–17
10	Robert Vaihola	64	2022–23 2024–25

Season
Rk	Player	Blocks	Season
1	Brandon Clarke	77	2016–17
2	Gerald Thomas	62	1987–88
3	Ibrahima Diallo	58	2022–23
4	Menelik Barbary	49	2006–07
	Alex Brown	49	2012–13
6	Chris Oakes	44	2009–10
	Robert Vaihola	44	2024–25
8	Darnell Williams	43	1999–00
9	Chris Oakes	40	2008–09
	Brandon Clarke	39	2015–16

Single game
Rk	Player	Blocks	Season	Opponent
1	Menelik Barbary	9	2006–07	Idaho
