= 1980 Pacific Coast Athletic Association men's basketball tournament =

- Classification: Division I
- Season: 1979–80
- Teams: 7
- Site: Anaheim Convention Center; Anaheim, CA
- Champions: San José State (1st title)
- Winning coach: Bill Berry (1st title)
- MVP: Wally Rank (San José State)
- Pacific Coast Athletic Association men's basketball tournaments

1979–80 Pacific Coast Athletic Association men's basketball standings
	Conf.				Overall
Team	W		L	PCT	W		L	PCT
Utah State	11	–	2	.846	18	–	9	.667
Long Beach State	11	–	3	.786	22	–	12	.647
Fresno State	8	–	4	.667	17	–	7	.708
San Jose State†	7	–	6	.538	17	–	12	.586
Pacific	7	–	7	.500	15	–	16	.484
UC Santa Barbara (Note: Wins vacated by PCAA but still recognized by NCAA.)	5	–	9	.357	11	–	16	.407
Cal State Fullerton	4	–	10	.286	10	–	17	.370
UC Irvine (Note: UC Irvine claims two losses against UC Santa Barbara that were vacated by PCAA as wins.)	1	–	13	.071	9	–	18	.333
† 1980 PCAA tournament winner

The 1980 Pacific Coast Athletic Association men's basketball tournament (now known as the Big West Conference men's basketball tournament) was held February 28–March 2 at the Anaheim Convention Center in Anaheim, California.

San José State topped Long Beach State in the championship game, 57–55, to win the Spartans' first PCAA/Big West men's basketball tournament.

The Spartans, in turn, received a bid to the 1980 NCAA tournament, their second all-time. They were joined in the tournament by regular season-champions Utah State, who earned an at-large bid.

== Format ==
After increasing to eight teams in 1979, the tournament field decreased back to seven. PCAA member Fresno State did not participate.

With only seven teams participating, the top-seeded team was given a bye into the semifinals while the remaining six teams were entered into the first round and seeded based on regular season conference records.

== Bracket ==
First round Thursday, February 28
5	UC Santa Barbara	66
4	San José State	73
3	Pacific	70
6	Cal State Fullerton	58
7	UC Irvine	56
2	Long Beach State	64

Semifinals; Friday, March 1
1	Utah State	68
4	San José State	94
3	Pacific	70
2	Long Beach State	72

Championship; Saturday, March 2
4	San José State	57
2	Long Beach State	55
