= 1979–80 San Jose State Spartans men's basketball team =

American college basketball season

1979–80 San Jose State Spartans men's basketball
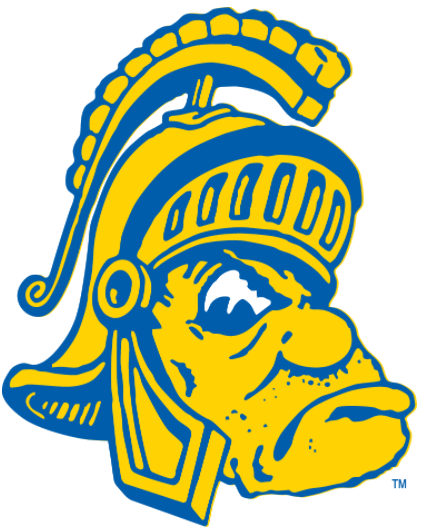

Cable Car Classic champions PCAA tournament champions

NCAA tournament, First Round
- Conference: Pacific Coast Athletic Association
- Record: 17–12 (7–6 PCAA)
- Head coach: Bill Berry (1st season)
- Home arena: San Jose Civic Auditorium (Capacity: 2,850)

1979–80 Pacific Coast Athletic Association men's basketball standings
	Conf.				Overall
Team	W		L	PCT	W		L	PCT
Utah State	11	–	2	.846	18	–	9	.667
Long Beach State	11	–	3	.786	22	–	12	.647
Fresno State	8	–	4	.667	17	–	7	.708
San Jose State†	7	–	6	.538	17	–	12	.586
Pacific	7	–	7	.500	15	–	16	.484
UC Santa Barbara (Note: Wins vacated by PCAA but still recognized by NCAA.)	5	–	9	.357	11	–	16	.407
Cal State Fullerton	4	–	10	.286	10	–	17	.370
UC Irvine (Note: UC Irvine claims two losses against UC Santa Barbara that were vacated by PCAA as wins.)	1	–	13	.071	9	–	18	.333
† 1980 PCAA tournament winner

The 1979–80 San Jose State Spartans men's basketball team represented San Jose State University during the 1979–80 NCAA Division I men's basketball season. The Spartans were led by first-year head coach Bill Berry and played their home games at the San Jose Civic Auditorium. SJSU was a member of the Pacific Coast Athletic Association.

The Spartans finished 17–12 overall, and 7–6 in the conference. During the season, San José State was invited and participated in the Cable Car Classic in Santa Clara, California. San José State defeated Virginia and Santa Clara to earn 1st place. San José State also lost to North Texas and Oklahoma City but won against St. Francis Brooklyn to earn 7th place in the All-College Basketball Classic in Oklahoma City, Oklahoma. In the postseason, San José State defeated Pacific, Utah State, and Long Beach State in the 1980 PCAA Conference men's basketball tournament in Anaheim, California. The Spartans were invited and participated in the 1980 NCAA Division I men's basketball tournament, where they lost to Missouri in Lincoln, Nebraska in the first round.

== Roster ==
1979–80 San José State Spartans roster
Name	#	Position	Height
Wally Rank	30	Guard	6–6
Mickey Jackson	33	Forward	6–7
Arthur Graham	40	Center	6–8
Doug Murrey	35	Forward	6–5
Michael Mendez	25	Guard	6–4
Sid Williams	42	Center	6–7
Dan Sullivan	44	Guard	6–6
Ed Saunders	14	Guard	6–1
David Byrd	15	Guard	6–4
John Russo	24	Guard	6–4
Steve Swarbick	32	Center	6–9
Ron Chisholm	10	Guard	6–4

Bill Berry, Michigan State alumnus, was the Spartans' head coach in 1979–80.

== Schedule ==
Date time, TV	Rank^{#}	Opponent^{#}	Result	Record	Site city, state
Non-conference regular season
November 30, 1979*		Missouri Western	W 58–54	1–0	San Jose Civic Auditorium; San Jose, CA
December 3, 1979*		at Arizona	L 70–72	1–1	McKale Center; Tucson, AZ
December 5, 1979*		Montana	L 72–74	1–2	San Jose Civic Auditorium; San Jose, CA
December 7, 1979*		Portland	L 72–73	1–3	San Jose Civic Auditorium; San Jose, CA
December 15, 1979*		at Stanford; Rivalry	W 67–66	2–3	Maples Pavilion; Stanford, CA
December 18, 1979*		at Saint Mary's	W 61–57	3–3	McKeon Pavilion; Moraga, CA
December 21, 1979*		vs. No. 12 Virginia; Cable Car Classic	W 83–79	4–3	Leavey Center; Santa Clara, CA
December 22, 1979*		at Santa Clara; Cable Car Classic	W 77–62	5–3	Leavey Center; Santa Clara, CA
December 26, 1979*		vs. North Texas; All-College Basketball Classic	L 61–72	5–4	Cox Center; Oklahoma City, OK
December 28, 1979*		at Oklahoma City; All-College Basketball Classic	L 75–77	5–5	Cox Center; Oklahoma City, OK
December 29, 1979*		vs. St. Francis Brooklyn; All-College Basketball Classic	W 78–63	6–5	Cox Center; Oklahoma City, OK
January 3, 1980*		Sacramento State	W 90–46	7–5	San Jose Civic Auditorium; San Jose, CA
PCAA regular season
January 10, 1980		Pacific	W 65–59	8–5 (1–0)	San Jose Civic Auditorium; San Jose, CA
January 13, 1980		Fresno State; Rivalry	L 44–48	8–6 (1–1)	San Jose Civic Auditorium; San Jose, CA
January 17, 1980		Long Beach State	W 64–61	9–6 (2–1)	San Jose Civic Auditorium; San Jose, CA
January 19, 1980		at UC Santa Barbara	L 66–76	9–7 (2–2)	The Thunderdome; Santa Barbara, CA
January 24, 1980		at Utah State	L 92–95	9–8 (2–3)	Smith Spectrum; Logan, UT
January 27, 1980		Utah State	W 69–67	10–8 (3–3)	San Jose Civic Auditorium; San Jose, CA
January 31, 1980		UC Irvine	W 82–47	11–8 (4–3)	San Jose Civic Auditorium; San Jose, CA
February 2, 1980		Cal State Fullerton	W 72–69	12–8 (5–3)	San Jose Civic Auditorium; San Jose, CA
February 7, 1980		at Cal State Fullerton	W 66–58	13–8 (6–3)	Titan Gym; Fullerton, CA
February 9, 1980		at UC Irvine	W 74–59	14–8 (7–3)	Crawford Hall; Irvine, CA
February 14, 1980		UC Santa Barbara	L 51–52	14–9 (7–4)	San Jose Civic Auditorium; San Jose, CA
February 16, 1980		at Long Beach State	L 74–82	14–10 (7–5)	Long Beach Arena; Long Beach, CA
February 23, 1980		at Pacific	L 73–83	14–11 (7–6)	Stockton Memorial Civic Auditorium; Stockton, CA
PCAA tournament
February 28, 1980	(4)	vs. (6) UC Santa Barbara; Quarterfinals	W 73–66	15–11	Anaheim Convention Center; Anaheim, CA
March 1, 1980	(4)	vs. (1) Utah State; Semifinals	W 94–68	16–11	Anaheim Convention Center; Anaheim, CA
March 2, 1980	(4)	vs. (2) Long Beach State; Championship	W 57–55	17–11	Anaheim Convention Center; Anaheim, CA
NCAA tournament
March 6, 1980	(MW 12)	vs. (MW 5) No. 16 Missouri; First Round	L 51–61	17–12	Bob Devaney Sports Center; Lincoln, NE
*Non-conference game. ^{#}Rankings from AP Poll. (#) Tournament seedings in parentheses. All times are in Pacific Time.
