= Phil Johnson (basketball, born 1958) =

American college basketball coach (born 1958)

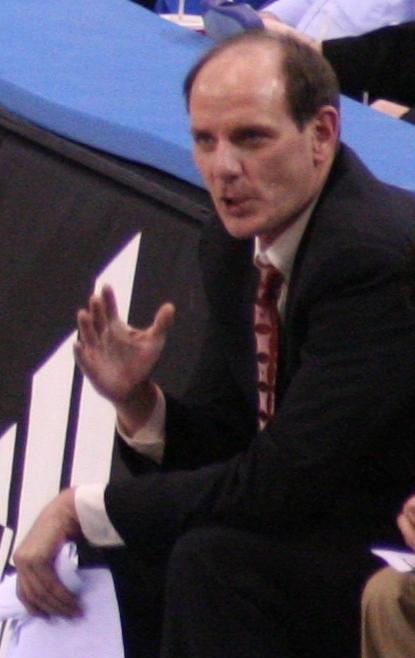
- Johnson coaches USC in 2007

Biographical details
- Born: June 4, 1958 (age 68)

Playing career
- 1977–1981: East Central Oklahoma State

Coaching career (HC unless noted)
- 1982–1985: East Central Oklahoma State (asst.)
- 1985–1987: Northern Oklahoma JC
- 1987–1990: Seminole JC
- 1990–1991: Tulsa (asst.)
- 1991–1993: New Orleans (asst.)
- 1993–1998: Arizona (asst.)
- 1998–1999: San Jose State
- 1999–2001: Chicago Bulls (asst.)
- 2002–2005: San Jose State
- 2005–2010: USC (asst.)
- 2010–2017: UTEP (asst.)
- 2017–2018: UTEP (interim)

Head coaching record
- Overall: 41–98 (.295)

Accomplishments and honors

Championships
- As head coach: NJCAA Oklahoma (1988); Bi-State Conference (1989); As assistant coach: NCAA (1997); Sun Belt regular season (1993); 2× Pac-10 regular season (1994, 1998); Pac-10 tournament (2009)

Phillip Lane Johnson (born June 4, 1958) is an American college basketball coach. He was the interim men's head basketball coach at the University of Texas at El Paso (UTEP).

== Early life and college career ==
After graduating from Putnam City High School in Warr Acres, Oklahoma in 1976, Johnson attended East Central Oklahoma State University. At East Central Oklahoma State, Johnson was basketball co-captain in his senior season. Johnson graduated from East Central Oklahoma with a B.A. in education in 1981. He then earned an M.A. from Henderson State University in 1982.

== Coaching career ==
=== Assistant coach and junior college head coach ===
After earning his master's degree, Johnson began his coaching career in 1982 at East Central Oklahoma State and coached there for three seasons. In 1985, Johnson worked his first head coaching position at Northern Oklahoma Junior College and coached there for two seasons. In 1987, Johnson became head coach at Seminole Junior College, also in Oklahoma. In his three seasons coaching Seminole, Johnson led Seminole to the 1988 state championship and 1989 Bi-State Conference championship.

Johnson moved to the NCAA ranks in the 1990–91 season as an assistant under J. D. Barnett at Tulsa. The following season, Johnson began what would be several stints as an assistant coach under Tim Floyd at New Orleans. In Johnson's second season as assistant, New Orleans qualified for the 1993 NCAA tournament and finished the season ranked #17 in the AP Poll and first in the Sun Belt Conference.

Johnson then became an assistant at Arizona under Lute Olson for five seasons from 1993 to 1998, including the 1997 national championship team. In every season with Johnson as assistant, Arizona was ranked in the year-end AP Polls.

=== First stint at San Jose State ===
In 1998, Johnson began one of two stints as San Jose State head coach. San Jose State improved from 3–23 in the 1997–98 season to 12–16 in the 1998–99 season, including wins over Jerry Tarkanian's Fresno State and Don Haskins's UTEP.

=== Chicago Bulls assistant ===
In his first professional coaching position, Johnson was an assistant coach for the Chicago Bulls from 1999 to 2002, again under Tim Floyd; Johnson remained on staff under Bill Cartwright, after Floyd resigned in December 2001 following a 4–21 start.

=== Second stint at San Jose State ===
In 2002, Johnson returned to San Jose State to be head coach. San Jose State went 7–21 in the 2002–03 season, then 6–23 the following season. On February 25, 2004, San Jose State and the Western Athletic Conference both reprimanded Johnson for what San Jose State described as a "verbal confrontation with a UTEP fan" during the February 19 game against UTEP. This was six years before Johnson became an assistant coach at UTEP. San Jose State athletic director Chuck Bell stated: "While recognizing that the fan's verbal harassment of Coach Johnson throughout the game led to the confrontation, under no circumstances can a coach allow himself to be placed in a situation that jeopardizes the safety of the players and the fans in an arena." The same day of the reprimand, the San Jose Mercury News revealed that Johnson had a suspended driver's license due to three arrests for drunk driving from 2002 and 2003.

San Jose State fired Johnson after the 2004–05 season, in which San Jose State finished 6–23 for the second straight season. In 2008, the NCAA reduced the number of scholarships for San Jose State men's basketball by two, as a result of an unsatisfactory four-year Academic Progress Rate of 886 (the minimum satisfactory APR is 925) that spanned Johnson's final two seasons (2003–04 and 2004–05) and the first two seasons of succeeding head coach George Nessman (2005–06 and 2006–07).

=== Assistant at USC and UTEP ===
From 2005 to 2010, Johnson was an assistant coach at USC under Tim Floyd. For his first four seasons at USC, Johnson served under Tim Floyd, and Johnson remained on staff in the 2009–10 season under Kevin O'Neill. Johnson helped USC make the 2007, 2008, and 2009 NCAA Tournaments and the 2009 Pac-10 tournament. However, in 2010, the NCAA vacated all of USC's wins from the 2007–08 season.

For the fourth time, Johnson became an assistant coach on Tim Floyd's staff in 2010, with UTEP. UTEP made the 2011 National Invitation Tournament and 2014 College Basketball Invitational in Johnson's time at UTEP.

On February 24, 2011, Johnson was ejected from UTEP's game at East Carolina for receiving two technical fouls.

On January 30, 2015, C-USA issued a reprimand to Johnson for throwing a piece of paper on the court during UTEP's game against Marshall. Johnson served as interim head coach for the February 28, 2015 game at Southern Miss because regular head coach Tim Floyd was suspended for violating league conduct policy. UTEP lost, 63–60. However, Floyd was still credited for the win.

=== Interim head coach at UTEP ===
On November 28, 2017, Johnson was named interim head coach of the Miners following Floyd's abrupt retirement.

== Head coaching record ==
Record table
| Season | Team | Overall | Conference | Standing | Postseason |
|---|---|---|---|---|---|
San Jose State Spartans (Western Athletic Conference) (1998–1999)
| 1998–99 | San Jose State | 12–16 | 5–9 | 6th (Pacific) | |
San Jose State Spartans (Western Athletic Conference) (2002–2005)
| 2002–03 | San Jose State | 7–21 | 4–14 | 9th | |
| 2003–04 | San Jose State | 6–23 | 1–17 | 10th | |
| 2004–05 | San Jose State | 6–23 | 3–15 | 10th | |
| San Jose State: | | 31–83 (.272) | 13–55 (.191) | | |
UTEP Miners (Conference USA) (2017–2018)
| 2017–18 | UTEP | 10–15 | 6–12 | T-11th | |
| UTEP: | | 10–15 (.400) | 6–12 (.333) | | |
| Total: | | 41–98 (.295) | | | |
