= The Healthy Back Store =

Chain of stores founded in Rockville, Maryland, US

The Healthy Back Store, or simply Healthy Back, was a chain of stores centered in Maryland and Virginia that sold products aimed at helping people with back pain or other physical conditions. The company stated on its website www.healthyback.com that it is out of business as of September 20, 2023. The company was founded by Anthony Mazlish in 1994 in Rockville, Maryland after he suffered a back injury and found there was an open niche for a specialty back retailer.

Healthy Back has 19 locations in 7 states and a corporate office in Beltsville, Maryland. They are currently the largest independently owned back care retailer. A 2008 report quoted the founder as stating that e-commerce made up 40% of their sales.

On April 1, 2015, the Healthy Back Store filed for Chapter 11 Bankruptcy (Case 15-14653) in the United States Bankruptcy Court for the District of Maryland.

== Acquisitions ==
In the late 1990s, the Healthy Back Store acquired three Natural Back Stores in California, bringing the chain to 8 locations. Healthy Back bought out the Maryland-based JoAnne's Bed and Back chain of stores for $600,000 in 2008 following the latter's filing for Chapter 11 bankruptcy earlier that year. At the time of the merger, Healthy Back's sales were $40 million per year, and Joanne's $10 million. Joanne's had played a role in Mazlish's entry into the back business, when he purchased a back cushion from the chain's Tyson's Corner location upon first moving to the District in 1993.

As early as 1998, US News noted that the four major back-related stores, Healthy Back Store, Better Back Store, Relax the Back, and JoAnne's Bed & Back Shops, had a combined business of $75 million.
