= Relax The Back =

Retail chain store for back support products

- Type: Retail
- Industry: Provides education and products aiding in the relief and prevention of back pain
- Founded: Austin, Texas, U.S. (1984)
- Headquarters: Long Beach, California, U.S.
- Number of locations: More than 70 stores nationwide (2024) at 2024-09-05
- Area served: United States
- Products: Zero-Gravity Recliners, Tempur-Pedic Mattresses, Pillows, Office chairs, Massage chairs, Lumbar supports, Exercise balls, Inversion Tables

Relax The Back is a chain of retail stores of back pain relief and wellness products with more than 70 locations in the United States.

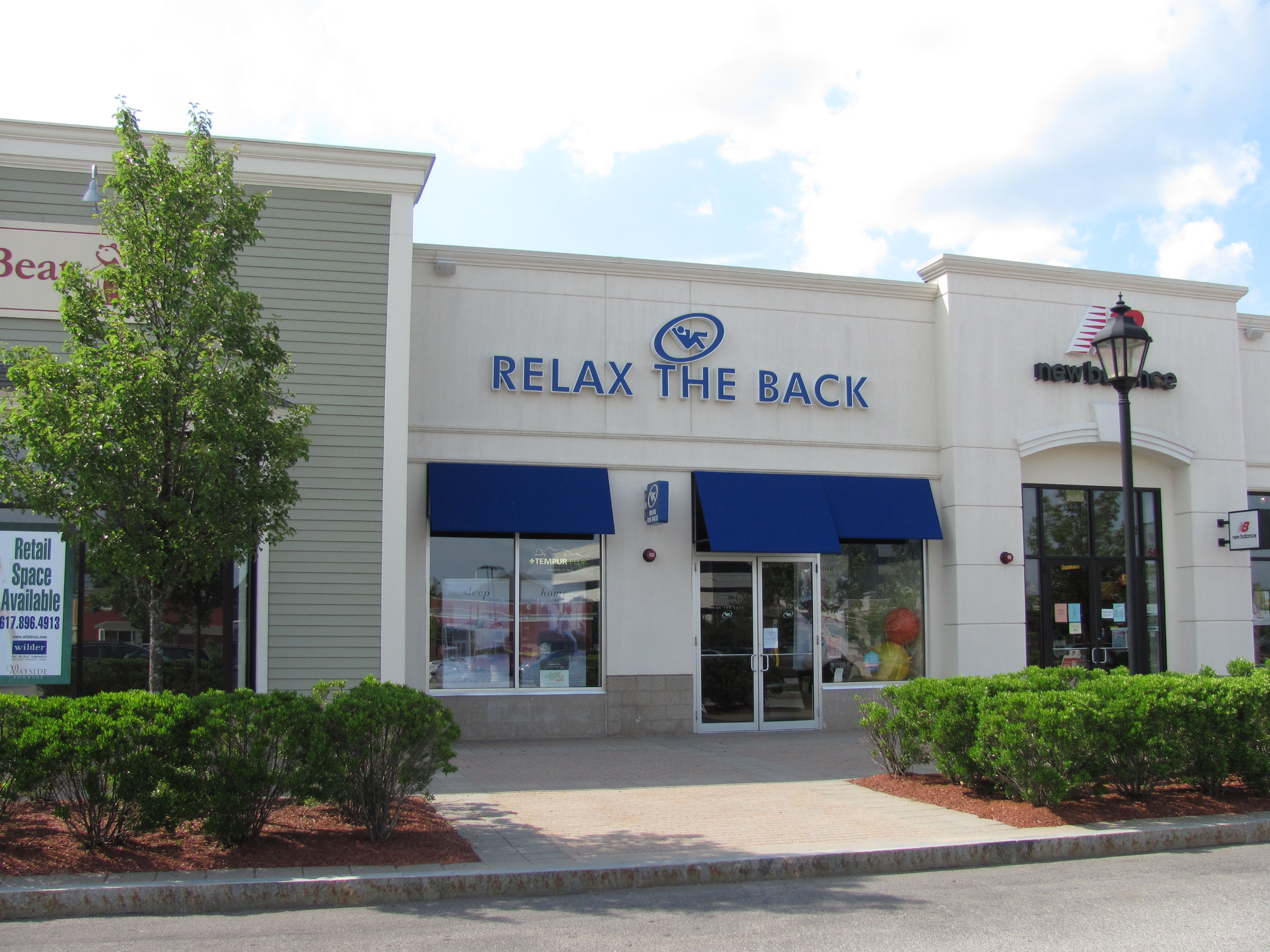
Relax the Back at Wayside Commons in Burlington, Massachusetts

== History ==
The first Relax The Back store opened in Austin, Texas in 1984. In 1987, an entrepreneur named Virginia Rogers purchased the original store and packaged the business into a franchise format. The first franchise was opened in San Antonio in 1989 by Coby Dietrick, a former professional basketball player with the San Antonio Spurs. In 1996, having grown the chain to 59 stores, Rogers sold the company to a franchisee, Dairl Johnson, for $6 million. Johnson continued to develop the company's independent franchising model. Relax The Back corporate offices are currently located in Long Beach, California.

As early as 1998, US News noted that the four major back-related stores, Healthy Back Store, Better Back Store, Relax the Back, and JoAnne's Bed & Back Shops, had a combined business of $75 million.
