= Wil Carter =

American professional basketball player

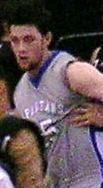
- Carter with San Jose State in 2011

Personal information
- Born: January 23, 1988 (age 38) Pocatello, Idaho, U.S.
- Listed height: 6 ft 8 in (2.03 m)
- Listed weight: 234 lb (106 kg)

Career information
- High school: Highland (Pocatello, Idaho)
- College: Salt Lake CC (2006–2007, 2009–2010); San Jose State (2010–2012)
- NBA draft: 2012: undrafted
- Playing career: 2012–present
- Position: Small forward

Career history
- 2012–2013: EiffelTowers Den Bosch
- 2013–2014: Keravnos B.C.
- 2014–?: Berck
- 2016–present: Shinshu Brave Warriors

Career highlights
- 2× Academic All-WAC (2011, 2012)

Jeffrey William "Wil" Carter (born January 23, 1988) is an American professional basketball player.

== Early life ==
Carter was born in Pocatello, Idaho and graduated from Highland High School of Pocatello in 2006. At Highland, Carter lettered in basketball and track.

== College career ==
Carter played on the Salt Lake Community College men's basketball team in the 2006–2007 and 2009–2010 seasons. As a freshman, Carter was a teammate of future professional player Gary Wilkinson. As a sophomore in 2010, Carter averaged 12.2 points and 7.0 rebounds in a 24–8 season for the Salt Lake Bruins.

He then transferred to San Jose State University and played two seasons on the Spartans men's basketball team from 2010 to 2012 under coach George Nessman. Starting all 33 games of his 2010–2011 junior season, Carter averaged 9.8 points and 8.0 rebounds and made 46% of field goals, including near 52% of field goals in the last 14 games of the season. With 265 rebounds in the season, Carter was the team's leading rebounder. San Jose State finished the season 17–16 and advanced to the 2011 College Basketball Invitational (CBI), the school's first postseason tournament appearance since the 1996 NCAA tournament. Carter was an Academic All-Western Athletic Conference (WAC) honoree this season.

However, San Jose State fell to a 9–22 record in the 2011–2012 season. With the second-most points per game, Carter averaged 13.2 points and 8.6 rebounds and improved his overall field goal percentage to 51%. Again, Carter was the top rebounder for the team this season, with 268 total; he also was the second-leading scorer. Carter was a first-team Academic All-American finalist and earned his second Academic All-WAC honors. Carter earned a B.A. in communication studies from San Jose State in May 2012.

== Professional career ==
Carter signed with Dutch Basketball League team EiffelTowers on July 27, 2012. He averaged 12.7 points and 6.2 rebounds per game in 35 DBL games with EiffelTowers.

In November 2013, Carter signed with Keravnos Strovolos.

On July 27, 2014, Carter signed with Berck BC of the French fourth-tier Nationale 2.

== Personal life ==
Carter is member of the Church of Jesus Christ of Latter-day Saints and served a mission in Brazil from 2008 to 2009. While with San Jose State, Carter was the only married member of the basketball team; his wife works for a physical therapist in San Jose.
