= Darnell Hillman =

American basketball player (born 1949)

Personal information
- Born: August 29, 1949 (age 77) Sacramento, California, U.S.
- Listed height: 6 ft 9 in (2.06 m)
- Listed weight: 215 lb (98 kg)

Career information
- High school: Hiram W. Johnson (Sacramento, California)
- College: San Jose State (1968–1969)
- NBA draft: 1971: 1st round, 8th overall pick
- Drafted by: Golden State Warriors
- Playing career: 1971–1980
- Position: Power forward / center
- Number: 20, 28, 30

Career history
- 1971–1977: Indiana Pacers
- 1977–1978: New Jersey Nets
- 1978: Denver Nuggets
- 1978–1979: Kansas City Kings
- 1979–1980: Golden State Warriors

Career highlights
- 2× ABA champion (1972, 1973); NBA Slam Dunk Contest champion (1977)

Career ABA and NBA statistics
- Points: 7,339 (9.8 ppg)
- Rebounds: 5,187 (7.6 rpg)
- Blocks: 782 (1.3 bpg)
- Stats at NBA.com
- Stats at Basketball Reference

Darnell Hillman (born August 29, 1949) is an American former professional basketball player who spent nine seasons in the American Basketball Association and National Basketball Association with the Indiana Pacers, New Jersey Nets, Denver Nuggets, Kansas City Kings and Golden State Warriors.

== Early life ==
Hillman graduated from Hiram W. Johnson High School.

The 6-foot-9 (2.06 m) forward played college basketball for the San Jose State Spartans. He was named first-team All-WCAC in 1969 after setting a school record for rebounding in a season (with 327, for a 14.2 average per game) and averaging 15.3 points.

While at SJSU, Hillman also branched out into track and field. In the high jump, he cleared 6'11 1/2", which still ranks 10th on San Jose's all-time list. Hillman also played for the United States men's national basketball team at the 1970 FIBA World Championship.

== Professional career ==
Hillman was selected 19th overall by Indiana in the 1971 ABA Draft. Only nine weeks later, he was also chosen by the Golden State Warriors in the 1971 NBA draft with the eighth overall pick. Ultimately, he opted to play for the Pacers of the American Basketball Association.

Hillman played six seasons for the Pacers, who joined the National Basketball Association (NBA) with the ABA–NBA merger in June 1976. Hillman earned a reputation for his stylish slam dunks and oversized afro hairstyle.

He would even be named the winner of the NBA's Slam Dunk Contest in the 1976–77 season, which was a precursor to the event that's known today, although he wouldn't be given an official trophy for it until March 8, 2017. In the final of that contest, which took place at halftime of Game 5 of the 1977 NBA Finals, Hillman defeated Larry McNeill of the Golden State Warriors. At the time of the final, Hillman's rights had been traded to the New York Nets, but he had not yet signed a contract. Since he was not officially a member of any NBA team, instead of wearing a jersey, he competed in a plain white tank top. Then for the post-competition interview, Hillman donned a shirt with the words "Bottle Shoppe" – the name of an Indianapolis liquor store, which is still in existence, and was the sponsor of a city parks softball league team for which Hillman played left field (and the only team he was a member of at the time).

Hillman later played with the New Jersey Nets, Denver Nuggets, Kansas City Kings, and Golden State Warriors in the NBA, and he ended his career in 1980 with combined NBA/ABA totals of 6,666 points and 5,187 rebounds during the regular season, and 7,339 points and 5,809 rebounds including the postseason.

Hillman was once asked by a reporter if it was true he could jump high enough to grab a quarter off the top of the backboard. Hillman responded, "Put a $100 bill up there and see." The reporter, who had heard the stories of Hillman picking quarters off the top of backboards, turned down the offer.

== Post-retirement ==
At the 1997 ABA reunion, Hillman won the "Biggest ABA Afro" Award.

Currently, Hillman serves as associate director of Camps, Clinics & Alumni Relations for the Indiana Pacers.

On February 4, 2012, Hillman's #45 was retired by San Jose State University. Hillman joined Ricky Berry (#34) and Olivier Saint-Jean (#3) as the only Spartans to have their jerseys retired.
