= 1979–80 UC Irvine Anteaters men's basketball team =

American college basketball season

1979–80 UC Irvine Anteaters men's basketball
- Conference: Pacific Coast Athletic Association
- Record: 9–18 (Note: UC Irvine officially claims two losses vacated by UC Santa Barbara as wins.) (1–13 PCAA)
- Head coach: Tim Tift (11th season)
- Assistant coaches: Dean Andrea; Burt Golden
- Home arena: Crawford Hall

1979–80 Pacific Coast Athletic Association men's basketball standings
	Conf.				Overall
Team	W		L	PCT	W		L	PCT
Utah State	11	–	2	.846	18	–	9	.667
Long Beach State	11	–	3	.786	22	–	12	.647
Fresno State	8	–	4	.667	17	–	7	.708
San Jose State†	7	–	6	.538	17	–	12	.586
Pacific	7	–	7	.500	15	–	16	.484
UC Santa Barbara (Note: Wins vacated by PCAA but still recognized by NCAA.)	5	–	9	.357	11	–	16	.407
Cal State Fullerton	4	–	10	.286	10	–	17	.370
UC Irvine (Note: UC Irvine claims two losses against UC Santa Barbara that were vacated by PCAA as wins.)	1	–	13	.071	9	–	18	.333
† 1980 PCAA tournament winner

The 1979–80 UC Irvine Anteaters men's basketball team represented the University of California, Irvine during the 1979–80 NCAA Division I men's basketball season. The Anteaters were led by eleventh year head coach Tim Tift and played their home games at Crawford Hall. They were members of the Pacific Coast Athletic Association. They finished the season 4–18 and 1–13 in PCAA play.

== Previous season ==
The 1978–79 Anteaters finished the season with a record of 9–17 and 3–11 in PCAA play. The anteaters were invited to the PCAA tournament for the first time and were eliminated Pacific Tigers in the first round.

== Off-season ==
=== 1979 Recruiting Class ===
College recruiting information (1979)
Name	Hometown	School	Height	Weight	Commit date
James Brooker; F	N/A	Mission San Jose High School (CA)	6 ft 6 in (1.98 m)	N/A	
James Brooker; F	Recruit ratings: No ratings found				
Rick Doyle; C	N/A	Santa Rosa High School (CA)	6 ft 9 in (2.06 m)	235 lb (107 kg)	
Rick Doyle; C	Recruit ratings: No ratings found				
Barry Smith; C	N/A	Mission San Jose High School (CA)	6 ft 10 in (2.08 m)	220 lb (100 kg)	
Barry Smith; C	Recruit ratings: No ratings found				
Tony Welch; G	N/A	Sacred Heart High School	6 ft 3 in (1.91 m)	190 lb (86 kg)	
Tony Welch; G	Recruit ratings: No ratings found				
Overall recruit ranking:
Note: In many cases, Scout, Rivals, 247Sports, On3, and ESPN may conflict in their listings of height and weight.; In these cases, the average was taken. ESPN grades are on a 100-point scale.; Sources:

== Roster ==
1979–80 UC Irvine Anteaters men's basketball team
Players
Coaches

Pos.	#	Name	Height	Weight	Year	Hometown
G		Robbie Bell	6 ft 3 in (1.91 m)	—	So
F		Don Barnes	6 ft 7 in (2.01 m)	—	Fr
G		Louis Bremond	6 ft 0 in (1.83 m)	—	So
F		Quentin Brown	6 ft 6 in (1.98 m)	—	Jr
G		John Clark	6 ft 4 in (1.93 m)	—	Jr
F		Victor Conyers	6 ft 8 in (2.03 m)	—	Sr
F		Rick Doyle	6 ft 9 in (2.06 m)	—	Fr
C		Lamont Jerrett	6 ft 10 in (2.08 m)	—	Jr
F		Steve Rodgers	6 ft 8 in (2.03 m)	—	Sr
G		Mark Sullivan	6 ft 2 in (1.88 m)	—	Fr
G		Tony Welch	6 ft 3 in (1.91 m)	—	Fr

Head coach

Tim Tift(Pepperdine)

Assistant coach(es)

- Dean Andrea
- Burt Golden

Legend

- (C) Team captain
- (S) Suspended
- (I) Ineligible
- (W) Walk-on
- Injured
- Current redshirt

Roster
Last update: July 24, 2017

== Schedule ==
Date time, TV	Rank^{#}	Opponent^{#}	Result	Record	Site (attendance) city, state
Regular season
November 30, 1979*		Samford	W 93–79	1–0	Crawford Hall (873); Irvine, CA
December 1, 1979*		Saint Mary's	L 66–68	1–1	Crawford Hall (937); Irvine, CA
December 8, 1979*		at Northern Arizona	L 77–84 ^{OT}	1–2	Walkup Skydome (7,153); Flagstaff, AZ
December 14, 1979*		Chico State	W 85–56	2–2	Crawford Hall (406); Irvine, CA
December 15, 1979*		North Park	L 55–69	2–3	Crawford Hall (512); Irvine, CA
December 17, 1979*		Central	W 74–60	3–3	Crawford Hall (319); Irvine, CA
December 19, 1979*		Jackson State	W 56–50	4–3	Crawford Hall (201); Irvine, CA
December 21, 1979*		vs. Portland State; Portland State Tournament	W 69–56	5–3	Portland State University Gym (517); Portland, OR
December 22, 1979*		vs. Pepperdine; Portland State Tournament	L 55–68	5–4	Portland State University Gym (450); Portland, OR
December 28, 1979*		vs. Hofstra; Crusader Classic	L 83–84 ^{2OT}	5–5	Hart Recreation Center (4,000); Worcester, MA
December 29, 1979*		vs. Assumption; Crusader Classic	L 65–67	5–6	Hart Recreation Center (4,000); Worcester, MA
January 2, 1980*		vs. Western Illinois	W 83–74	6–6	Crawford Hall (247); Irvine, CA
January 10, 1980		at Long Beach State	L 46–77	6–7 (0–1)	Long Beach Arena (3,187); Long Beach, CA
January 12, 1980		UC Santa Barbara	L 59–61 (Note: Vacated by Pacific Coast Athletic Association, claimed by UC Irvine as wins)	6–8 (0–2)	Crawford Hall (1,049); Irvine, CA
January 16, 1980		at Pacific	L 46–59	6–9 (0–3)	Stockton Memorial Civic Auditorium (2,530); Stockton, CA
January 19, 1980		at Fresno State	L 53–68	6–10 (0–4)	Selland Arena (6,530); Fresno, CA
January 24, 1980		at Cal State Fullerton	L 53–68	6–11 (0–5)	Titan Gym (1,350); Fullerton, CA
January 26, 1980		Cal State Fullerton	L 62–63	6–12 (0–6)	Crawford Hall (1,232); Irvine, CA
January 31, 1980		at San Jose State	L 47–82	6–13 (0–7)	San Jose Civic Auditorium (1,453); San Jose, CA
February 2, 1980		at Utah State	L 81–98	6–14 (0–8)	Dee Glen Smith Spectrum (8,918); Logan, UT
February 7, 1980		Utah State	L 83–87 ^{OT}	6–15 (0–9)	Crawford Hall (719); Irvine, CA
February 9, 1980		San Jose State	L 59–74	6–16 (0–10)	Crawford Hall (3,196); Irvine, CA
February 14, 1980		Fresno State	L 47–51	6–17 (0–11)	Crawford Hall (519); Irvine, CA
February 16, 1980		Pacific	W 63–60	7–17 (1–11)	Crawford Hall (487); Irvine, CA
February 21, 1980		at UC Santa Barbara	L 66–81 (Note: Vacated by Pacific Coast Athletic Association, claimed by UC Irvine as wins)	7–18 (1–12)	UCSB Events Center (2,300); Santa Barbara, CA
February 24, 1980		Long Beach State	L 26–30	7–19 (1–13)	Crawford Hall (1,429); Irvine, CA
PCAA tournament
February 28, 1980		vs. Long Beach State; Quarterfinals	L 56–64	7–20	Anaheim Convention Center (3,221); Anaheim, CA
*Non-conference game. ^{#}Rankings from AP Poll. (#) Tournament seedings in parentheses. All times are in Pacific Time.

== Awards and honors ==
- Victor Conyers
  - PCAA Second Team All-Conference
