= Adrian Oliver =

American basketball player (born 1988)

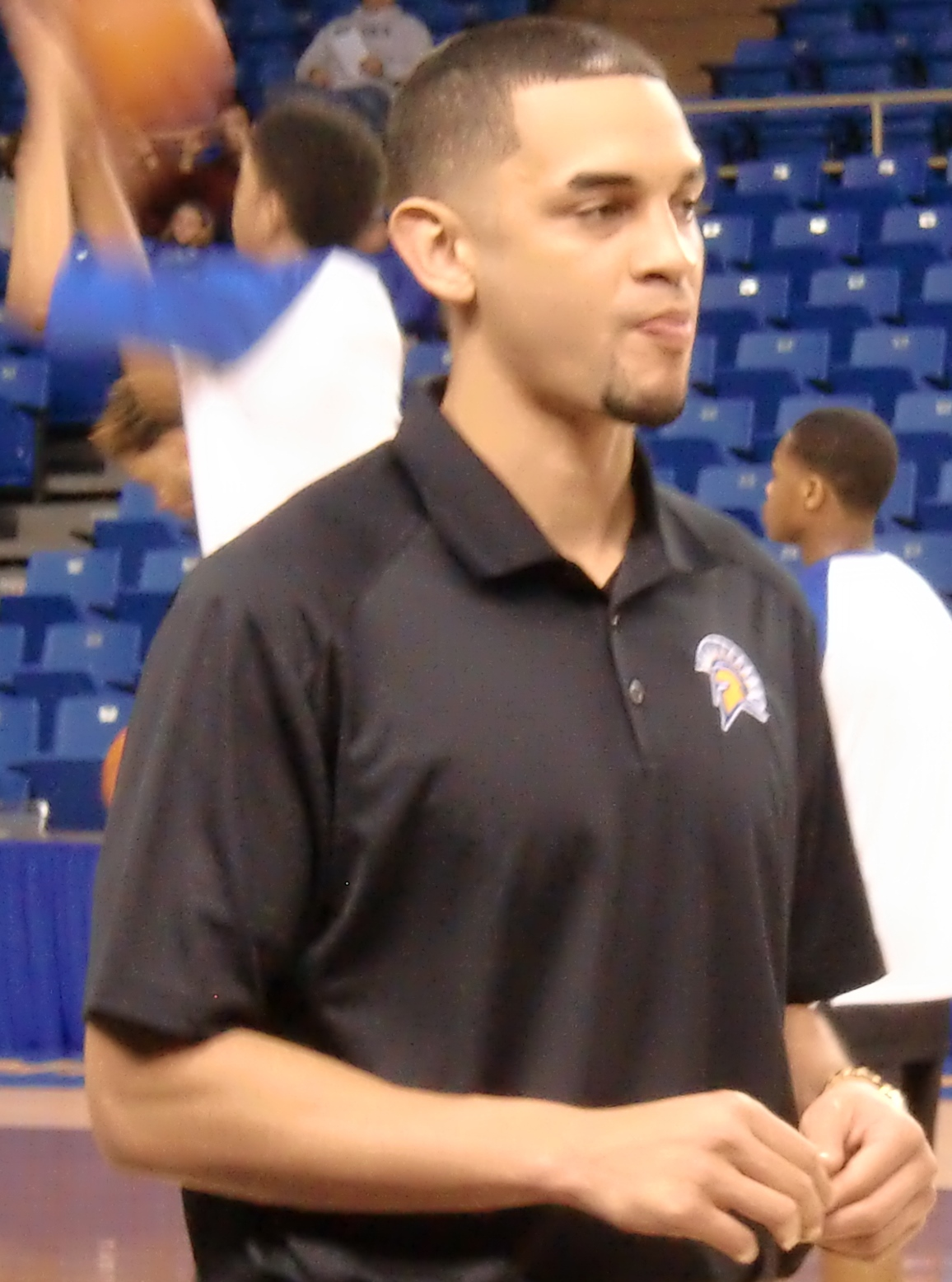
- Oliver attends a San Jose State game in 2016

Personal information
- Born: March 31, 1988 (age 38) Modesto, California, U.S.
- Listed height: 6 ft 4 in (1.93 m)
- Listed weight: 205 lb (93 kg)

Career information
- High school: Modesto Christian (Modesto, California)
- College: Washington (2006–2007); San Jose State (2008–2011)
- NBA draft: 2011: undrafted
- Playing career: 2011–2015
- Position: Shooting guard

Career history
- 2011: Aris
- 2011–2012: Reno Bighorns
- 2014: Taranaki Mountainairs
- 2014–2015: Fuerza Regia
- 2015: Mineros de Caborca

Career highlights
- 2× First-team All-WAC (2010, 2011)

Adrian McClinton Oliver (born March 31, 1988) is an American former professional basketball player. He played college basketball for the University of Washington from 2006 to 2007 and San Jose State University from 2008 to 2011.

== Early life ==
Born in Modesto, California, Oliver was raised by his single mother and grandparents after his father left the family when he was seven. Of mixed African American and Mexican American descent, Oliver graduated from Modesto Christian High School in 2006. He was a two-time, first-team all-state player who averaged 25.5 points as a senior and 26.1 points as a junior. Oliver's uncle, Allen Oliver, coached the Modesto Christian team while he played there.

College recruiting
Name	Hometown	School	Height	Weight	Commit date
Adrian Oliver; PG	Modesto, California	Modesto Christian HS	6 ft 3 in (1.91 m)	180 lb (82 kg)	May 23, 2005
Adrian Oliver; PG	Recruit ratings: Scout: Rivals:				
Overall recruit ranking: Scout: 8 (PG); 6 (school) Rivals: 15 (PG); 81 (national); 11 (CA); 7 (school)
Note: In many cases, Scout, Rivals, 247Sports, On3, and ESPN may conflict in their listings of height and weight.; In these cases, the average was taken. ESPN grades are on a 100-point scale.; Sources: "2006 Washington Basketball Commitment List". Rivals.; "2006 Washington College Basketball Team Recruiting Prospects". Scout.; "Scout.com Team Recruiting Rankings". Scout.; "2006 Team Ranking". Rivals.

== College career ==
=== University of Washington ===
Turning down scholarship offers from Gonzaga and Kentucky, Oliver attended the University of Washington from 2006 to 2007. At Washington he played in 38 games including 12 starts and averaging 4.7 points in 32 games in 2006–07, and 2.8 points in 6 games in 2007. Oliver was part of the recruiting class which included 2006 NBA draftee Spencer Hawes, who was a first round pick by the Kings.

On December 4, 2007, Oliver announced that he would leave Washington for personal reasons; his mother and stepfather could not move to Seattle. In a 2010 interview with Metro Silicon Valley, Oliver revealed that he transferred to SJSU because he received a phone call stating that his grandparents were ill. Oliver first learned about SJSU only one day before he visited the campus. Under NCAA rules, Oliver sat out of the basketball team for one year after transfer until December 2008.

=== San Jose State ===
At San Jose State, Oliver reunited with Amateur Athletic Union teammate Justin Graham. Oliver majored in sociology, with a concentration in criminology.

On December 20, 2008, Oliver debuted for San Jose State and scored 27 points in an 89–78 victory against Northern Colorado. On November 20, 2009, Oliver and his San Jose State team visited Oliver's former school Washington for a game; the Spartans lost 80–70. That game was the first and only time Oliver would play against his former team.

Averaging 22.5 points per game, Oliver was tied for fifth nationally with Devan Downey of South Carolina among the leading college basketball scorers of 2009–10. SJSU ended the 2009–10 season with a 14–17 record after being 12–8 at one point in February 2010; SJSU coach George Nessman commented, "That hit Adrian harder than anybody" and "Adrian always has been a really competitive kid, but he's really owning the team's results now." With his high scoring statistics, Oliver was seen as a key to SJSU having its first winning basketball season in nearly 20 years.

On January 26, 2010, Oliver won the Oscar Robertson National Player of the Week Award from the U.S. Basketball Writers Association for games ending the week of January 24, 2010. He was also selected as WAC Preseason Player of the Year prior to the 2010–11 season. During the summer before his senior season with the Spartans, Oliver worked with a personal trainer and played pickup basketball in Las Vegas, Nevada, with NBA players like Chuck Hayes, who attended Modesto Christian High.

When San Jose State beat Oregon 75–72 on November 20, 2010, that was the first time SJSU beat a Pac-10 team since 1992. Prior to that game, Oliver had 1,066 career points, the 10th-highest all-time total among Spartans men's basketball players. By December 2010, Oliver became the Spartans' lead scorer, having scored 34 points in the season opener 67–60 victory against Eastern Washington and 35 points in an 80–77 victory over UC Riverside. The San Francisco Chronicle reported that Oliver was the top scorer of all San Francisco Bay Area college basketball players.

In the 2011 WAC men's basketball tournament, eighth-place San Jose State beat fifth-place Hawaii 75–74 after Oliver scored a jumper with 5 seconds left. The Spartans then defeated fourth-place Idaho 74–68. However, in the semifinal game, San Jose State lost to first-place Utah State 58–54. Oliver missed a potentially game-winning three-pointer with eight seconds remaining in the second half, and Tai Wesley made two free throws to seal the victory. San Jose State finished 2010–11 with a 17–15 record including 5–11 in regular season WAC play.

== Professional career ==
Oliver went undrafted in the 2011 NBA draft. On August 25, 2011, he signed a two-year deal with Aris B.C. of Greece. In October 2011, Oliver scored 16 points in Aris' 80–59 Greek Basketball Cup loss to defending Greek Cup champions, Olympiacos B.C. In November 2011, he left Aris after appearing in just three league games.

On December 10, 2011, Oliver signed with the Sacramento Kings. He played one minute in a preseason game on December 17 against the Golden State Warriors, recording one rebound. He was later waived by the Kings on December 21, 2011. On December 28, 2011, Oliver was acquired by the Reno Bighorns of the NBA Development League. On January 11, 2012, he was waived by the Bighorns due to injury. Oliver averaged 6.6 points, 2.4 rebounds and 1.0 assists per game with 39.3% field goal shooting in five games with Reno.

On November 1, 2012, Oliver was reacquired by the Bighorns. In Reno's one preseason game, a 111–103 win over the Idaho Stampede, Oliver recorded 8 points and 1 assist. On November 21, 2012, he was waived by the Bighorns.

On August 8, 2013, Oliver signed with Stelmet Zielona Góra of Poland for the 2013–14 season. However, he was released by Stelmet a month later due to a range of injuries.

In November 2013, Oliver joined the South Houston Assault of the American Basketball Association to attend their training camp.

In March 2014, Oliver signed with the Taranaki Mountainairs for the 2014 New Zealand NBL season. On May 10, 2014, he recorded a franchise-high 42 points in a 126–90 win over the Super City Rangers. On June 9, 2014, he was released by the Mountainairs due to injury and clashes with management.

On August 22, 2014, Oliver signed a one-year deal with Fuerza Regia of the Liga Nacional de Baloncesto Profesional. He made just one appearance for the team in 2014–15, scoring six points on February 21, 2015, against Gansos Salvajes. Later that year, he had a three-game stint with Mineros de Caborca.
