= Hiram W. Johnson High School =

Coordinates: 38°32′27″N 121°25′31″W

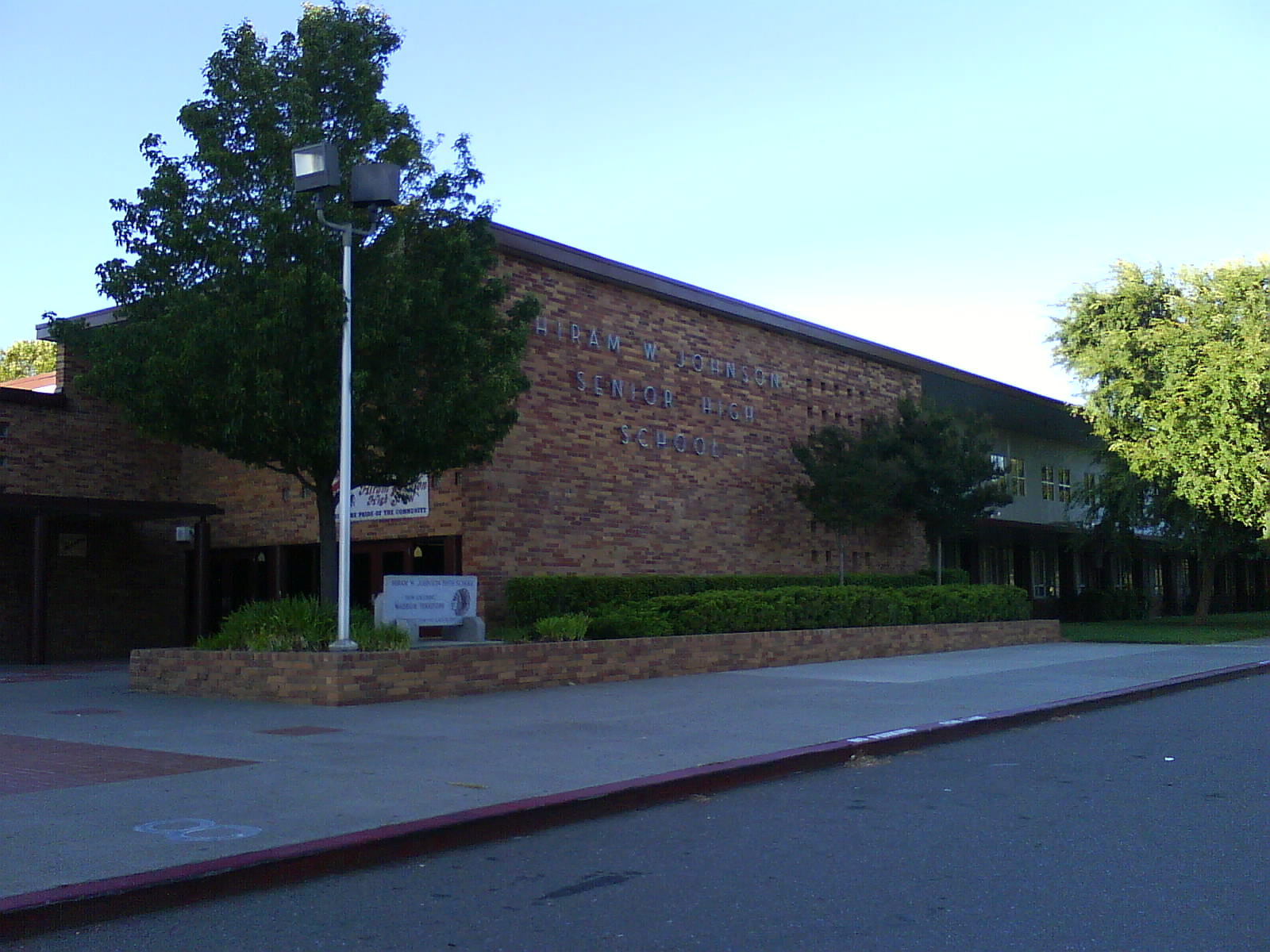
- 6879 14th Avenue; Sacramento, California 95820; United States

Information
- Type: Public secondary
- Established: 1958
- School district: Sacramento City Unified School District
- Principal: Garrett Kirkland
- Grades: 9-12
- Enrollment: 1,627 (2023-2024)
- Colors: Maroon and gray
- Mascot: Warriors
- Newspaper: Smoke Signal
- Website: Hiram Johnson High School

Hiram W. Johnson High School is a secondary school in the Sacramento City Unified School District, in the Tahoe Park South area of Sacramento, California, United States.

== Notable alumni ==
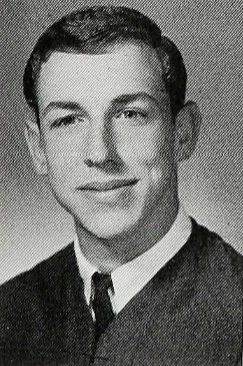
Sal Viscuso

- Henry Andrade, hurdler
- Bryan Barber, motion picture and music video director
- Ken Forsch, former Major League Baseball pitcher for Houston Astros and California Angels.
- Bob Forsch, former Major League Baseball pitcher for St Louis Cardinals and Houston Astros.
- Darnell Hillman, "Dr dunk" former National Basketball Association, and ABA player for Indiana Pacers and five other teams.
- Sal Viscuso (Class of 1966), actor
- Chino Moreno, lead singer for Deftones
- Mozzy, rapper
