= Bill Berry (basketball) =

American basketball coach

Personal information
- Born: 1942 (age 83–84) Winnemucca, Nevada, U.S.
- Listed height: 6 ft 5 in (1.96 m)

Career information
- High school: Humboldt County (Winnemucca, Nevada)
- College: Michigan State (1961–1964)
- NBA draft: 1964: undrafted
- Position: Guard
- Coaching career: 1966–2007

Career history

Coaching
- 1966–1969: Highlands HS
- 1970–1972: Cosumnes River JC
- 1972–1977: California (assistant)
- 1977–1979: Michigan State (assistant)
- 1979–1989: San Jose State
- 1989–1991: Sacramento Kings (scout/assistant)
- 1991–1999: Houston Rockets (scout/assistant)
- 1999–2003: Chicago Bulls (assistant)
- 2001: Chicago Bulls (interim)
- 2006–2007: Washington Wizards (assistant)

Career highlights
- 2× NBA champion (1994, 1995); PCAA tournament champion (1980); NCAA champion (1979)

William Edward Berry (born 1942) is an American former basketball coach.

== Early life and college career ==
Berry was born in Winnemucca, Nevada and graduated from Humboldt County High School in 1960. He then attended Michigan State University. From 1961 to 1964, Berry played on the Michigan State Spartans men's basketball team under coach Forddy Anderson. At Michigan State, Berry was the top team rebounder for the 1962–63 season with 184 total rebounds and 9.2 per game. Berry earned his bachelor's degree in 1965 and master's degree in 1969 from Michigan State, both in physical education.

== Coaching career ==
Berry began his coaching career in 1966 as head varsity basketball coach at Highlands High School of North Highlands, California and stayed as coach until 1969. After completing his master's degree at Michigan State, Berry became head coach at Cosumnes River Junior College from 1970 to 1972. Then, Berry became an assistant coach at the NCAA Division I level with California until 1977. Berry then returned to his alma mater Michigan State to be an assistant coach under Jud Heathcote and was part of the coaching staff of the 1979 NCAA championship team that featured Magic Johnson.

From 1979 to 1989, Berry was the head men's basketball coach at San Jose State. For the San Jose State Spartans, Berry had a 142–144 record, then the Spartans' second-highest win total under one coach. Under Berry, San Jose State had a 17–12 record in the 1979–80 season, won the 1980 PCAA tournament, and made the 1980 NCAA tournament. In a 21–9 season in 1980–81, San Jose State qualified for the 1981 National Invitation Tournament. San Jose State also had three straight seasons over .500 from 1984 to 1987. However, the 1988–89 Spartans finished 5–23. In January 1989, when the team was 5–11, 10 of the 14 players on the Spartans men's basketball team accused Berry of "mental cruelty" and refused to play or practice under Berry as coach. However, the players declined to provide specific examples. Berry then organized a new team of walk-on athletes, including star football player Johnny Johnson. San Jose State dismissed Berry after the season on March 24, 1989.

After San Jose State, Berry entered the NBA as a scout and assistant coach for the Sacramento Kings in 1989. He transferred to the Houston Rockets as a scout in 1991 and then assistant coach in February 1992 under Rudy Tomjanovich. Berry was an assistant coach to the Rockets 1994 and 1995 championship teams. From 1999 to 2003, Berry was an assistant coach for the Chicago Bulls

Berry was an assistant under Tim Floyd until Floyd resigned on Christmas Eve (December 24) of 2001, when the Bulls named Berry as interim head coach. Berry coached two games, both losses, and Bill Cartwright became permanent head coach effective December 28. On September 7, 2006, the Washington Wizards announced that Bill Berry would join the team as an assistant coach to head coach Eddie Jordan.

== Personal life ==
Bill Berry has been married to Clarice "Reese" Berry since 1963 and had two children. The Berry family lived in Morgan Hill, California, during Bill Berry's tenure at San Jose State. Their son Ricky Berry (1964–1989) played college basketball at San Jose State under Bill Berry and in the NBA for the Sacramento Kings before committing suicide in 1989.

== Head coaching record ==
=== College ===
Record table
Season	Team	Overall	Conference	Standing	Postseason
San Jose State Spartans (Pacific Coast Athletic Association/Big West Conference) (1979–1989)
1979–80	San Jose State	17–12	7–6	4th	NCAA First Round
1980–81	San Jose State	21–9	10–4	2nd	NIT First Round
1981–82	San Jose State	13–13	7–7	T–4th	
1982–83	San Jose State	14–15	7–9	6th	
1983–84	San Jose State	10–18	6–12	T–7th	
1984–85	San Jose State	16–13	10–8	T–4th	
1985–86	San Jose State	16–12	9–9	T–4th	
1986–87	San Jose State	16–14	10–8	T–2nd	
1987–88	San Jose State	14–15	8–10	T–6th	
1988–89	San Jose State	5–23	1–17	10th	
San Jose State:		142–140	75–86		
Total:		142–140			
National champion Postseason invitational champion Conference regular season champion Conference regular season and conference tournament champion Division regular season champion Division regular season and conference tournament champion Conference tournament champion

=== NBA ===
Legend
Regular season	G	Games coached	W	Games won	L	Games lost	W–L %	Win–loss %
Playoffs	PG	Playoff games	PW	Playoff wins	PL	Playoff losses	PW–L %	Playoff win–loss %

Team	Year	G	W	L	W–L%	Finish	PG	PW	PL	PW–L%	Result
CHI	2001–02	2	0	2	.000	(interim)	—	—	—	—	—
