= 1979–80 Utah State Aggies men's basketball team =

American college basketball season

1979–80 Utah State Aggies men's basketball

Pacific Coast Athletic Association Regular season champion

NCAA tournament, First Round
- Conference: Pacific Coast Athletic Association
- Record: 18-9 (11-2 PCAA)
- Head coach: Rod Tueller
- Home arena: Dee Glen Smith Spectrum

1979–80 Pacific Coast Athletic Association men's basketball standings
| | Conf. | | | | Overall |
| Team | W | | L | PCT | W | | L | PCT |
|---|---|---|---|---|---|---|---|---|
| Utah State | 11 | – | 2 | .846 | 18 | – | 9 | .667 |
| Long Beach State | 11 | – | 3 | .786 | 22 | – | 12 | .647 |
| Fresno State | 8 | – | 4 | .667 | 17 | – | 7 | .708 |
| San Jose State† | 7 | – | 6 | .538 | 17 | – | 12 | .586 |
| Pacific | 7 | – | 7 | .500 | 15 | – | 16 | .484 |
| UC Santa Barbara (Note: Wins vacated by PCAA but still recognized by NCAA.) | 5 | – | 9 | .357 | 11 | – | 16 | .407 |
| Cal State Fullerton | 4 | – | 10 | .286 | 10 | – | 17 | .370 |
| UC Irvine (Note: UC Irvine claims two losses against UC Santa Barbara that were vacated by PCAA as wins.) | 1 | – | 13 | .071 | 9 | – | 18 | .333 |
† 1980 PCAA tournament winner

The 1979–80 Utah State Aggies men's basketball team represented Utah State University during the 1979–80 men's college basketball season. They received the conference's automatic bid to the NCAA Tournament where they lost in the first round to Clemson.

== Roster ==
1979–80 Utah State Aggies men's basketball team
| Players | Coaches |
|---|---|
| Pos. / # / Name / Height / Weight / Year / Hometown; F / 30 / Dean Hunger / 6 ft 8 in (2.03 m) / 215 lb (98 kg) / Sr / Kaysville, Utah | Head coach: Rod Tueller; Assistant coach(es) Legend: (C) Team captain; (S) Suspended; (I) Ineligible; (W) Walk-on; Injured; Current redshirt |

== Schedule ==
| Date time, TV | Rank^{#} | Opponent^{#} | Result | Record | Site city, state |
|---|---|---|---|---|---|
| November 30* | | Weber State | W 92–84 | 1–0 | Dee Glen Smith Spectrum; Logan, Utah |
| December 4* | | at Utah | L 74–88 | 1–1 | Jon M. Huntsman Center; Salt Lake City, Utah |
| December 6* | | at Weber State | L 73–79 | 1–2 | Dee Events Center; Ogden, Utah |
| December 10* | | Nevada | W 113–95 | 2–2 | Dee Glen Smith Spectrum; Logan, Utah |
| December 13* | | Idaho State | W 87–77 | 3–2 | Dee Glen Smith Spectrum; Logan, Utah |
| December 15* | | at Colorado | L 79–84 | 3–3 | CU Events Center; Boulder, Colorado |
| December 19* | | Utah | W 96–88 | 4–3 | Dee Glen Smith Spectrum; Logan, Utah |
| December 22* | | BYU | L 84–89 | 4–4 | Dee Glen Smith Spectrum; Logan, Utah |
| December 28* | | vs. La Salle | W 89–88 | 5–4 | The Pit; Albuquerque, NM |
| December 29* | | at New Mexico | W 117–83 | 6–4 | The Pit; Albuquerque, NM |
| January 5* | | Redlands | W 101–59 | 7–4 | Dee Glen Smith Spectrum; Logan, Utah |
| January 10 | | Fresno State | W 78–65 | 8–4 (1–0) | Dee Glen Smith Spectrum; Logan, Utah |
| January 12 | | Pacific | W 90–86 | 9–4 (2–0) | Dee Glen Smith Spectrum; Logan, Utah |
| January 17 | | at UC-Santa Barbara | W 88–84 | 10–4 (3–0) | The Thunderdome; Santa Barbara, California |
| January 19 | | at Long Beach State | W 100–92 | 11–4 (4–0) | Long Beach Arena; Long Beach, California |
| January 24 | | San Jose State | W 95–92 | 12–4 (5–0) | Dee Glen Smith Spectrum; Logan, Utah |
| January 27 | | at San Jose State | L 67–69 | 12–5 (5–1) | San Jose Civic Auditorium; San Jose, California |
| January 31 | | Cal State Fullerton | L 88–96 | 12–6 (5–2) | Dee Glen Smith Spectrum; Logan, Utah |
| February 2 | | UC-Irvine | W 98–81 | 13–6 (6–2) | Dee Glen Smith Spectrum; Logan, Utah |
| February 7 | | at UC-Irvine | W 87–83 ^{OT} | 14–6 (7–2) | Crawford Hall; Irvine, California |
| February 9 | | at Cal State Fullerton | W 69–67 | 15–6 (8–2) | Titan Gym; Fullerton, California |
| February 12* | | at BYU | L 83–84 | 15–7 (8–2) | Marriott Center; Provo, Utah |
| February 14 | | Long Beach State | W 96–90 | 16–7 (9–2) | Dee Glen Smith Spectrum; Logan, Utah |
| February 16 | | UC-Santa Barbara | W 54–51 | 17–7 (10–2) | Dee Glen Smith Spectrum; Logan, Utah |
| February 21 | | at Pacific | W 91–78 | 18–7 (11–2) | Stockton Memorial Civic Auditorium; Stockton, California |
PCAA tournament
| February 29 | | vs. San Jose State | L 68–94 | 18–8 (11–2) | The Pit; Albuquerque, NM |
NCAA Tournament
| March 6* | | vs. Clemson; First round | L 73–76 | 18–9 (11–2) | Dee Events Center; Ogden, Utah |
*Non-conference game. ^{#}Rankings from AP Poll. (#) Tournament seedings in parentheses.
