= Chris McNealy (basketball, born 1961) =

American professional basketball player

Personal information
- Born: July 15, 1961 (age 65) Fresno, California, U.S.
- Listed height: 6 ft 7 in (2.01 m)
- Listed weight: 210 lb (95 kg)

Career information
- High school: Roosevelt (Fresno, California)
- College: Santa Barbara CC (1979–1980); San Jose State (1980–1983)
- NBA draft: 1983: 2nd round, 38th overall pick
- Drafted by: Kansas City Kings
- Playing career: 1983–1999
- Position: Power forward
- Number: 14

Career history
- 1983–1984: Bic Trieste
- 1985–1986: Bay State Bombardiers
- 1986: Albany Patroons
- 1986–1987: New York Knicks
- 1987–1988: La Crosse Catbirds
- 1988–1989: Aurora Desio
- 1989–1990: Arimo Bologna
- 1990–1992: Lotus Montecatini
- 1992–1995: Bialetti Montecatini
- 1995–1996: Festina Andorra
- 1996–1997: CB León
- 1997–1998: Caja San Fernando
- 1998–1999: CB Granada

Career highlights
- CBA All-Star (1986); CBA All-Defensive First Team (1986); 2× First-team All-PCAC (1982, 1983)
- Stats at NBA.com
- Stats at Basketball Reference

Christopher McNealy (born July 15, 1961) is an American former professional basketball player. He played in the National Basketball Association for the New York Knicks between 1985 and 1988. He also played internationally in Italy and Spain. McNealy later acquired Italian citizenship.

McNealy's son, also named Chris, played college basketball for UC Irvine and plays professionally.

== Career statistics ==
Legend
GP	Games played	GS	Games started	MPG	Minutes per game
FG%	Field goal percentage	3P%	3-point field goal percentage	FT%	Free throw percentage
RPG	Rebounds per game	APG	Assists per game	SPG	Steals per game
BPG	Blocks per game	PPG	Points per game	**Bold**	Career high

=== NBA ===
==== Regular season ====
Year	Team	GP	GS	MPG	FG%	3P%	FT%	RPG	APG	SPG	BPG	PPG
1985–86	New York	30	6	**20.9**	.486	–	.660	**6.8**	**1.4**	**1.3**	**.4**	**5.7**
1986–87	New York	**59**	**16**	16.5	**.492**	–	.650	3.8	.8	.6	.3	3.9
1987–88	New York	19	0	13.9	.311	–	**.677**	3.4	1.2	.8	.1	3.5
Career		108	22	17.3	.456	–	.658	4.6	1.0	.8	.3	4.3
