= Omari Moore =

American basketball player (born 2000)

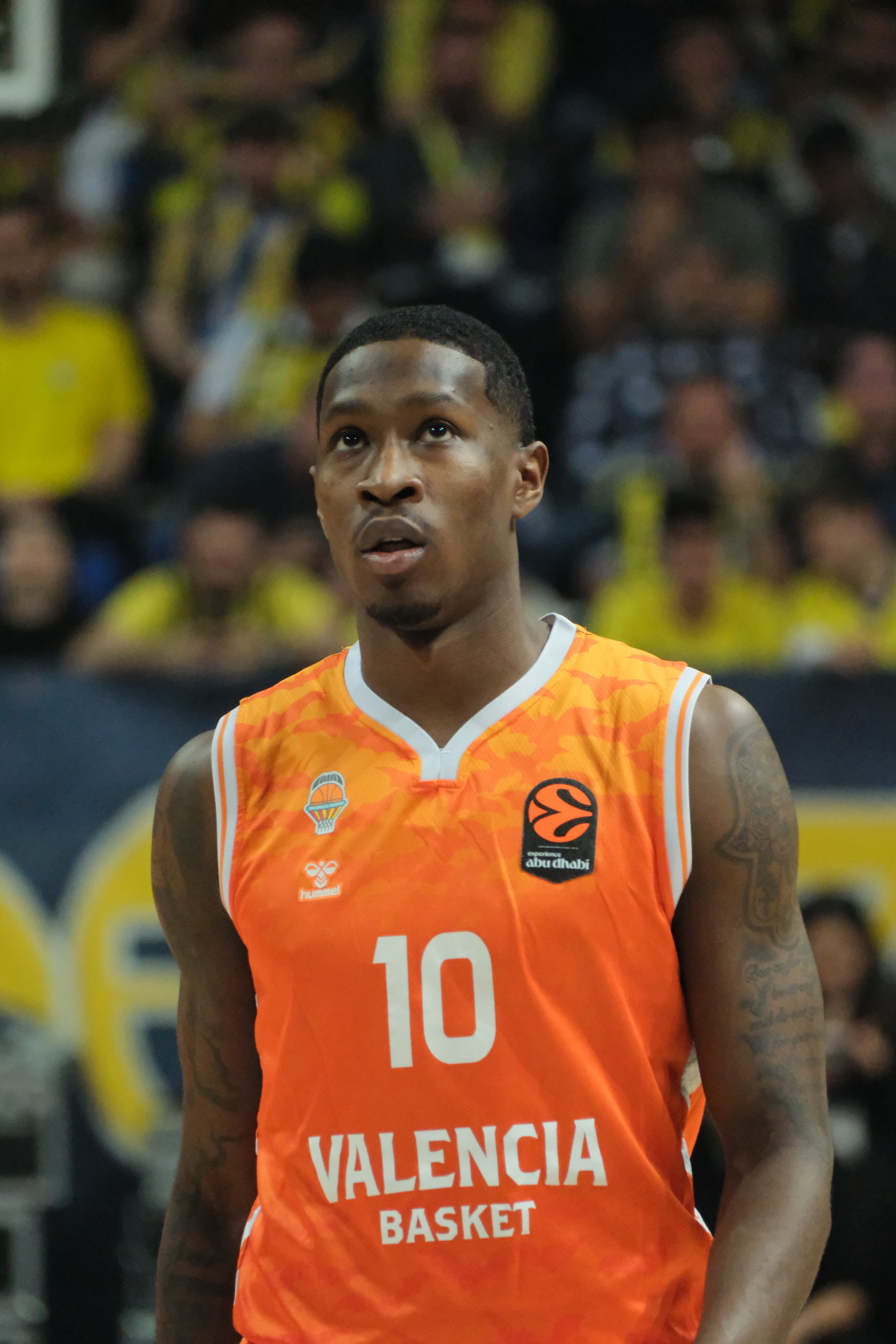
- Moore with Valencia Basket in 2026

No. 10 – Valencia Basket
- Position: Shooting guard / point guard
- League: Liga ACB; EuroLeague

Personal information
- Born: September 18, 2000 (age 26) Pasadena, California, U.S.
- Listed height: 2.00 m (6 ft 7 in)
- Listed weight: 88 kg (194 lb)

Career information
- High school: Pasadena (Pasadena, California); Middlebrooks Academy (Los Angeles, California)
- College: San Jose State (2019–2023)
- NBA draft: 2023: undrafted
- Playing career: 2023–present

Career history
- 2023–2024: Raptors 905
- 2024: Niagara River Lions
- 2024–2025: Darüşşafaka
- 2025–present: Valencia

Career highlights
- Liga ACB champion (2026); Spanish Supercup winner (2025); CEBL champion (2024); Mountain West Player of the Year (2023); First-team All-Mountain West (2023)
- Stats at NBA.com
- Stats at Basketball Reference

Omari Kamau Moore (born September 18, 2000) is an American–born naturalized Macedonian professional basketball player for Valencia of the Spanish Liga ACB and the EuroLeague. He played college basketball for the San Jose State Spartans of the Mountain West Conference. As a senior in 2023, Moore was the Mountain West Player of the Year.

== Early life and high school ==
Moore was born and raised in Pasadena, California and graduated from Pasadena High School in 2018. He averaged seven points per game during his senior season. Moore opted to enroll at Middlebrooks Academy Los Angeles for a postgraduate year, where he averaged 20 points and six assists per game. He committed to play college basketball at San Jose State (SJSU).

== College career ==
Moore appeared in all 31 of San Jose State's games during his freshman season and averaged 4.9 points, 2.3 rebounds, and 1.8 assists per game. He averaged 7.4 points and led the Spartans with 5.3 rebounds and 3.2 assists per game. Moore was named honorable mention All-Mountain West Conference after averaging 13.2 points, 5.2 rebounds, and 4.5 assists per game during his junior season. After the season, Moore entered his name into the 2022 NBA draft but did not sign with an agent to maintain his collegiate eligibility. He ultimately withdrew from the draft and returned to SJSU for his senior season. Moore was named was named the Mountain West Player of the Year at the end of his senior season after averaging 17.5 points, 4.6 rebounds, and 4.7 assists per game. Following the end of the season he entered the 2023 NBA draft.

== Professional career ==
=== Raptors 905 (2023–2024) ===
After going undrafted in the 2023 NBA draft, Moore signed a two-way contract with the Milwaukee Bucks on July 5, 2023. He played for the Bucks in the 2023 NBA Summer League and made one preseason appearance before being waived on October 18. On October 22, he signed with the Toronto Raptors, but was waived the same day.

Moore joined Raptors 905 of the NBA G League for the 2023–24 season. In 36 games, he averaged 9.3 points, 3.9 rebounds and 3.9 assists per game.

=== Niagara River Lions and Darüşşafaka Lassa (2024–2025) ===
On May 9, 2024, Moore signed with the Niagara River Lions of the Canadian Elite Basketball League (CEBL) for the 2024 season. He briefly left the River Lions midway through the season to play for the Toronto Raptors in the 2024 NBA Summer League. He returned following Summer League and helped the River Lions win the CEBL championship. In 16 CEBL games, he averaged of 11.6 points, 6.3 rebounds, 5.5 assists, 1.4 steals and 1.4 blocks per game.

In August 2024, Moore signed with Darüşşafaka Lassa of the Turkish Basketbol Süper Ligi. In 30 games during the 2024–25 season, he averaged 15.7 points, 5.3 rebounds, 5.5 assists and 1.3 steals per game.

On April 16, 2025, Moore re-signed with the Niagara River Lions for the 2025 CEBL season. However, he ultimately did not re-join the team. He later signed with the South East Melbourne Phoenix of the Australian National Basketball League (NBL) for the 2025–26 season on June 13, but agreed to a mutual release with the team on July 8.

Moore joined the San Antonio Spurs for the 2025 NBA Summer League.

=== Valencia Basket (2025–present) ===
On July 9, 2025, Moore signed with Valencia Basket of the Liga ACB. On March 31, 2026, Moore signed a contract extension with the team through the end of the 2026-2027 season.
