= George Nessman =

American athletic administrator and college basketball coach

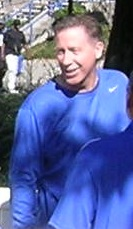

Current position
- Title: Athletic director
- Team: Justin-Siena High School
- Conference: CIF North Coast Section

Biographical details
- Born: March 22, 1959 (age 67); Stamford, Connecticut, U.S.
- Education: University of California, Berkeley; San Francisco State University; Saint Mary's College of California

Coaching career (HC unless noted)
- 1981–1984: Salesian HS (XC/track)
- 1984–1993: De La Salle HS
- 1993–2001: Porterville
- 2002–2004: Bakersfield
- 2004–2005: California (asst.)
- 2005–2013: San Jose State
- 2013–2014: Harker HS (asst. boys' JV)

Administrative career (AD unless noted)
- 1995–2001: Porterville CC
- 2014–present: Justin-Siena HS

Head coaching record
- Overall: 203–106 (junior college); 86–161 (college)
- Tournaments: 4–3 (CCCAA); 0–1 (CBI)

Accomplishments and honors

Championships
- CCCAA (2000)

Awards
- CCCAA Coach of the Year (2000)

George Raymond Nessman II (born March 22, 1959) is an American athletic administrator and former college basketball coach who is the current athletic director at Justin-Siena High School. Nessman coached at the high school and community college levels before becoming an assistant basketball coach at California in 2004. From 2005 to 2013, Nessman was the men's basketball head coach at San Jose State. He was also athletic director at Porterville College from 1995 to 2001 while also serving as men's basketball head coach.

== Early life and education ==
Nessman was born in Stamford, Connecticut and moved to the Bay Area when he was nine. Nessman graduated from De La Salle High School in Concord, California in 1977. Nessman received his Bachelor of Arts degree in social welfare from the University of California, Berkeley in 1981 and later two master's degrees: from San Francisco State University (1988, education) and from Saint Mary's College of California (1995, physical education and recreation).

== Coaching career ==
=== Salesian High School cross country and track ===
Nessman began coaching at the high school level after graduating from Berkeley: from 1981 to 1984, he coached cross country running and track and field at Salesian High School in Richmond, California.

=== De La Salle High School basketball ===
From 1984 to 1993, he coached varsity basketball at De La Salle High School in Concord, California. The De La Salle basketball team under Nessman had a 155–40 record, one section and five conference championships, and four appearances in the NorCal tournament, including a runner-up finish in 1993. Jon Barry and Brent Barry, the sons of Rick Barry who would later play in the National Basketball Association, played at De La Salle under Nessman.

=== Porterville CC and Bakersfield CC head coach ===
Next, Nessman coached basketball at the community college level. From 1993 to 2001, Nessman coached basketball at Porterville College and was also athletic director at the school from 1995 to 2001. During his eight seasons there, the team went 188–68, including a 33-4 state championship season in 2000, when Nessman was named California Community College Coach of the Year. Porterville had a 40-game win streak from January 2000 to February 2001.

In November 2000, the state Commission on Athletics placed Porterville on probation for a season due to improper benefits provided to men's basketball players. The next month, Nessman became interim head coach for Porterville's women's basketball team.

Nessman left the coaching position to become an academic advisor for athletics from 2001 to 2002 and then became head basketball coach of Bakersfield College for two years until 2004. Bakersfield went 30-32 under Nessman.

=== California assistant coach ===
Nessman returned to his alma mater UC Berkeley for the 2004–2005 to be an assistant coach and recruiter for the California Golden Bears men's basketball team. At California, Nessman coached future NBA draft picks DeVon Hardin and Dominic McGuire as well as power forward/center Rod Benson, who would play professionally in the NBA D-League and overseas.

=== San Jose State head coach ===
San Jose State University appointed Nessman as men's basketball head coach in March 2005, and Nessman was the only WAC coach with two master's degrees. The San Jose State Spartans finished the 2004–2005 season with a 6-23 overall record under coach Phil Johnson. San Jose State's athletic director at the time was Tom Bowen, who was previously athletic director at Concord's De La Salle High School when Nessman was varsity basketball coach there.

Nessman's first season was the first time the Spartans signed a player directly from a San Francisco Bay Area high school in 21 years. The Spartans finished 2005–2006, Nessman's first season, 6-24 (2-14 in Western Athletic Conference play), and Nessman signed three more Bay Area players to the team for the following season. Although SJSU finished 2006-2007 only 6-24 (4-12 WAC), San Jose State extended Nessman's contract, originally set at four years in 2005, for two more years through the 2010–11 season. The Spartans followed up with a 14-19 (4-12) record in 2007–2008, the best team record in 14 years. In 2008, the NCAA reduced the number of scholarships for San Jose State men's basketball by two, as a result of an unsatisfactory four-year Academic Progress Rate of 886 (the minimum satisfactory APR is 925) that spanned predecessor Phil Johnson's final two seasons (2003–04 and 2004–05) and Nessman's first two seasons.

In 2008–09, Nessman led the Spartans of San Jose State University to the most WAC road victories in eight seasons.

In earning a berth to the 2011 College Basketball Invitational, Nessman became the fourth basketball coach at San Jose State to lead the team to the postseason. The 17 wins for the 2010–11 season were the most for the Spartans since 1980–81. Bowen signed Nessman to a new three-year contract following the season. Adrian Oliver and Justin Graham earned all-Western Athletic Conference honors in 2011. However, San Jose State fell to 9–22 (1–13 in WAC play) in the 2011–12 season. In the 2012–13 season, after a 9–6 start, San Jose State finished 9-20 (3–14 WAC) following the suspension of leading scorer James Kinney. On March 13, 2013, athletic director Gene Bleymaier, who succeeded Bowen in 2012, fired Nessman.

Under Nessman, San Jose State reported five consecutive years of rising four-year average Academic Progress Rate (APR) scores, including a program-best 940 in the 2011–12 season (because of a perfect one-year 1000 score). However, the APR fell below 930 for the 2012–13 season, Nessman's last as head coach. As a result, the NCAA imposed sanctions on the San Jose State men's basketball program in April 2014 for the following season, including a postseason ban and reduced practice time. Athletic director Gene Bleymaier stated in response to the sanctions: "Last year, we were faced with a situation that needed to be dealt with in a major fashion. The coaching staff was not retained, and several players were not invited back for the 2013-14 season. Only four players returned from the 2012-13 team.

=== Harker School junior varsity assistant ===
In the 2013–14 school year, Nessman was a junior varsity boys' basketball assistant coach at the Harker School in San Jose. Harker JV finished 18–5.

== Justin-Siena High School athletic director ==
On July 1, 2014, Nessman became athletic director at Justin-Siena High School in Napa, California. Nessman on his hiring as Athletic Director, "I think there's been some outstanding success here. It's an outstanding place with a real important mission — to serve students and young people. I want athletics to reflect that." In Nessman's first year as athletic director, the Justin-Siena varsity football team won the CIF North Coast Section Division 4 championship.

== Personal life ==
Nessman and his wife Nancy have four children: Joshua, Veronica, Peter, and John.

== Head coaching record ==
=== Junior college ===
Record table
Season	Team	Overall	Conference	Standing	Postseason
Porterville Pirates (Central Valley Conference) (1993–2001)
1993–94	Porterville	3–22	1–11	T-7th	
1994–95	Porterville	11–19	3–11	7th	CCCAA Quarterfinals
1995–96	Porterville	19–11	8–6	2nd	
1996–97	Porterville	27–6	12–2	2nd	
1997–98	Porterville	29–6	12–2	1st	CCCAA Semifinals
1998–99	Porterville	28–5	12–2	T-1st	CCCAA Quarterfinals
1999–00	Porterville	33–4	12–2	1st	CCCAA Champions
2000–01	Porterville	29–1	13–1	1st	Ineligible
Porterville:		179–74	73–37		
Bakersfield Renegades (Western State Conference) (2002–2004)
2002–03	Bakersfield	12–18	4–8	5th (South)	
2003–04	Bakersfield	12–14	4–8	6th (South)	
Bakersfield:		24–32	8–16		
Total:		203–106			
National champion Postseason invitational champion Conference regular season champion Conference regular season and conference tournament champion Division regular season champion Division regular season and conference tournament champion Conference tournament champion

=== College ===
Record table
Season	Team	Overall	Conference	Standing	Postseason
San Jose State Spartans (Western Athletic Conference) (2005–2013)
2005–06	San Jose State	6–25	2–14	8th	
2006–07	San Jose State	5–25	4–12	8th	
2007–08	San Jose State	13–19	4–12	8th	
2008–09	San Jose State	13–17	6–10	T–6th	
2009–10	San Jose State	14–17	6–10	T–6th	
2010–11	San Jose State	17–16	5–11	8th	CBI First Round
2011–12	San Jose State	9–22	1–13	8th	
2012–13	San Jose State	9–20	3–14	T–8th	
San Jose State:		86–161 (.348)	31–96 (.244)		
Total:		86–161 (.348)			
