= Coby Dietrick =

American basketball player (born 1948)

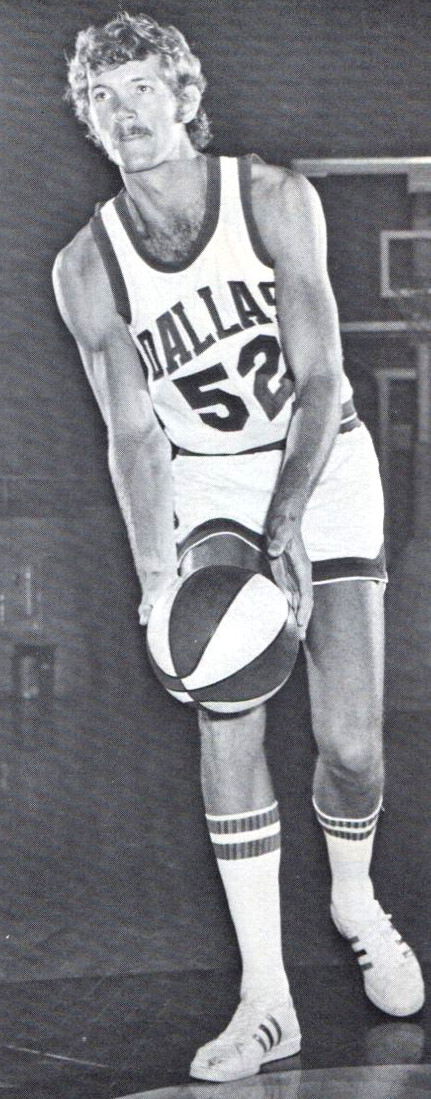
- Dietrick with the Dallas Chaparrals, c. 1972

Personal information
- Born: July 23, 1948 (age 78) Riverside, California, U.S.
- Listed height: 6 ft 11 in (2.11 m)
- Listed weight: 230 lb (104 kg)

Career information
- High school: Riverside Polytechnic (Riverside, California)
- College: San Jose State (1967–1970)
- NBA draft: 1970: 10th round, 155th overall pick
- Drafted by: San Francisco Warriors
- Playing career: 1970–1983
- Position: Power forward / center
- Number: 52, 25, 26

Career history
- 1970–1972: Memphis Pros
- 1972–1979: Dallas Chaparrals / San Antonio Spurs
- 1979–1982: Chicago Bulls
- 1983: San Antonio Spurs
- 1985: Tampa Bay Thrillers

Career highlights
- CBA champion (1985); Second-team All-PCAA (1970)

Career ABA and NBA statistics
- Points: 5,140 (6.1 ppg)
- Rebounds: 3,772 (4.5 rpg)
- Assists: 1,740 (2.1 apg)
- Stats at NBA.com
- Stats at Basketball Reference

Coby Joseph Dietrick (born July 23, 1948) is an American former professional basketball player.

Dietrick played college basketball for the San Jose State Spartans, where he was a second-team All-Pacific Coast Athletic Association selection in 1970. He played thirteen seasons (1970–1983) of professional basketball in both the American Basketball Association and the National Basketball Association. Dietrick spent the majority of his career with the San Antonio Spurs, a team that began in the ABA but joined the NBA after the ABA-NBA merger in 1976. He also played with the NBA's Chicago Bulls. In 1983, he retired with ABA/NBA career averages of 6.1 points per game and 4.5 rebounds per game.

Dietrick won a CBA championship with the Tampa Bay Thrillers of the Continental Basketball Association (CBA) in 1985.

He later worked as a color commentator for the Spurs. He also opened the first Relax The Back franchise store in San Antonio in 1989.
