= JoAnne's Bed and Back =

Defunct retail chain in the Mid-Atlantic region of the US

Joanne's Bed and Back
- Industry: Furniture retail
- Founded: 1977 (Beltsville, Maryland)
- Headquarters: Beltsville, MD
- Key people: Joanne Schatz

Joanne's Bed and Back was a retailer of specialty beds, mattresses, and chairs in the Mid-Atlantic region of the United States. The chain, which is based in Beltsville, Maryland, primarily has stores in the U.S. states of Maryland and Virginia. The company also had locations in New York in the past, when two stores opened in Manhattan during the 1990s. The chain markets to those with back problems who are looking for furniture to meet their special needs.

A Joanne's Bed and Back store

The company was founded in 1977 by JoAnne Schatz, and later expanded to more than a dozen locations. The company's greatest success came during the mid-1990s, when the chain doubled its number of stores. At its height, the chain had a total of 14 stores.

During the slower economic times of the 2000s, the chain's success declined. In April 2008, the company filed for Chapter 11 bankruptcy, and was acquired by Virginia-based Healthy Back, which planned to close half its stores. The stores are currently closed and the web address is for sale as of summer 2019.
