= Ricky Berry =

American basketball player (1964–1989)

Personal information
- Born: October 6, 1964 Lansing, Michigan, U.S.
- Died: August 14, 1989 (aged 24) Carmichael, California, U.S.
- Listed height: 6 ft 8 in (2.03 m)
- Listed weight: 205 lb (93 kg)

Career information
- High school: Live Oak (Morgan Hill, California)
- College: Oregon State (1983–1984); San Jose State (1985–1988)
- NBA draft: 1988: 1st round, 18th overall pick
- Drafted by: Sacramento Kings
- Playing career: 1988–1989
- Position: Small forward
- Number: 34

Career history
- 1988–1989: Sacramento Kings

Career highlights
- 3× First-team All-PCAA (1986–1988)
- Stats at NBA.com
- Stats at Basketball Reference
Medals
Men's basketball
Representing United States
Pan American Games
Silver medal – second place	1987 Indianapolis	Team competition

Ricky Alan Berry (October 6, 1964 – August 14, 1989) was an American professional basketball player in the National Basketball Association (NBA) for the Sacramento Kings.

== Early life ==
Berry was born in Lansing, Michigan in 1964, when his father Bill Berry was a student-athlete at Michigan State University. The Berry family moved to the Sacramento, California area in 1966 when Bill Berry became head coach at a local high school and later Cosumnes River Junior College. Berry attended Live Oak High School in Morgan Hill, California, when his father became head coach at San Jose State in 1979.

== Basketball career ==
Berry was 6 ft 8 in (2.03 m) and played small forward. After graduating from high school, he played for Oregon State in the 1983–84 season, and then transferred to San Jose State in 1984 to play under his father Bill Berry. After sitting out one year per transfer rules, Berry played for the San Jose State Spartans from 1985 to 1988. Berry was selected 18th overall in the 1988 NBA draft by the Sacramento Kings and had a solid rookie season, averaging 11.0 points, 3.1 rebounds, 1.3 assists while shooting 40.6 percent from three-point range.

Berry is one of only three former San Jose State players to have his jersey retired, when San Jose State retired his number 34 jersey.

== Personal life ==
Berry was married and had a son. Friends of his believed that Berry suffered from stress because of his marriage and he also engaged in infidelity. Berry had a strained relationship with his parents who only lived two hours away when he was playing in Sacramento; he eloped without the approval of his parents and his mother did not like his wife.

== Death ==
On August 14, 1989, Berry was found dead of a self-inflicted gunshot wound at his home in Carmichael, California. It was alleged that he had been involved in a heated argument with his wife, Valerie, the previous night. She left the house and returned the next morning to find Berry's body. A suicide note was found at the scene in which Berry wrote of marital dissatisfaction. He ended the note with, "P.S.S. I was able to die looking myself in the eye."

Berry was buried privately in his hometown of Lansing, Michigan, without a funeral. His father, Bill, said that he would never discuss Berry's death. Berry's friends claimed that the topic of him was "always off limits" with his family after his death.

The Kings made no mention of Berry's suicide when the 1989–90 NBA season began. Kings head coach Dick Motta said that "Berry has been a cloud over this team" during an interview in April 1990. The Kings finished the season with a 23–59 record in 1989–90.

== Career statistics ==
Legend
GP	Games played	GS	Games started	MPG	Minutes per game
FG%	Field goal percentage	3P%	3-point field goal percentage	FT%	Free throw percentage
RPG	Rebounds per game	APG	Assists per game	SPG	Steals per game
BPG	Blocks per game	PPG	Points per game	**Bold**	Career high

=== NBA ===
==== Regular season ====
Year	Team	GP	GS	MPG	FG%	3P%	FT%	RPG	APG	SPG	BPG	PPG
1988–89	Sacramento	64	21	22.0	.450	.406	.789	3.1	1.3	.6	.3	11.0

== See also ==
- List of basketball players who died during their careers
