= Wally Rank =

American basketball player

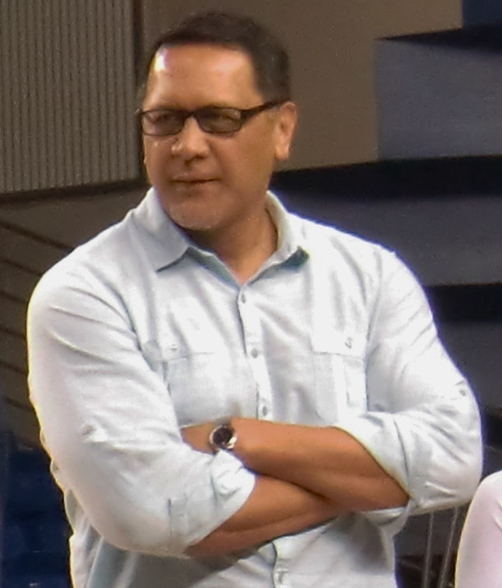
- Rank in 2016.

Personal information
- Born: March 1, 1958 (age 68) Fort Ord, California, U.S.
- Listed height: 6 ft 6 in (1.98 m)
- Listed weight: 220 lb (100 kg)

Career information
- High school: Carson (Carson, California)
- College: San Jose State (1976–1980)
- NBA draft: 1980: 5th round, 99th overall pick
- Drafted by: San Diego Clippers
- Playing career: 1980–1985
- Position: Small forward / shooting guard
- Number: 30

Career history
- 1980–1981: San Diego Clippers
- 1981–1982: Sacramora Rimini
- 1985: Great Taste Coffee Makers
- Stats at NBA.com
- Stats at Basketball Reference

Wallace Aliifua Rank (born March 1, 1958) is an American former professional basketball player.

A 6'6" swingman, Rank played college basketball for the San Jose State Spartans from 1977 to 1980. He scored 1,432 points in his college career and set a school record for points in a game when he tallied 40 against California State University, Sacramento on January 3, 1980.

In 1980, Rank was selected by the San Diego Clippers with the 99th pick of the 1980 NBA draft. He played 25 games for the Clippers during the 1980–81 NBA season, scoring 55 points. He later played for Sacramora Rimini in Italy and Great Taste Coffee Makers in the Philippines.

Rank is a Samoan American, and played for the Western Samoa national basketball team at the 1993 Oceania championship.

== Career statistics ==
Legend
| GP | Games played | GS | Games started | MPG | Minutes per game |
| FG% | Field goal percentage | 3P% | 3-point field goal percentage | FT% | Free throw percentage |
| RPG | Rebounds per game | APG | Assists per game | SPG | Steals per game |
| BPG | Blocks per game | PPG | Points per game | **Bold** | Career high |

=== NBA ===
==== Regular season ====
| Year | Team | GP | MPG | FG% | 3P% | FT% | RPG | APG | SPG | BPG | PPG |
|---|---|---|---|---|---|---|---|---|---|---|---|
| 1980–81 | San Diego | 25 | 6.1 | .368 | – | .464 | 1.2 | .7 | .3 | .0 | 2.2 |
