= San Jose State Spartans men's basketball =

Men's basketball team of San Jose State University

San Jose State Spartans
2026–27 San Jose State Spartans men's basketball team
- University: San José State University
- First season: 1909–10
- Athletic director: Jeff Konya
- Head coach: Tim Miles (6th season)
- Location: San Jose, California
- Arena: Provident Credit Union Event Center (capacity: 5,000)
- Conference: Mountain West
- Nickname: Spartans
- Colors: Gold, white, and blue
- Student section: Spartan Squad
- All-time record: 1,193–1,506 (.442)

NCAA Division I tournament appearances
- 1951, 1980, 1996

Conference tournament champions
- 1925, 1928, 1929, 1931, 1938, 1941, 1948, 1949, 1980, 1996

Uniforms
Home	Away

The San Jose State Spartans men's basketball team represents San José State University in NCAA Division I college basketball as a member of the Mountain West Conference.

== History ==
San Jose State Spartans very first men's basketball team in 1910; "SNS" is short for "State Normal School"

The SJSU men's basketball team played its first recorded game in 1909. The team has won 10 conference championships, appeared in the NCAA tournament three times, appeared once in the National Invitation Tournament (NIT), and twice in the College Basketball Invitational (CBI).

From the 1930s to 1976, the team played home games at the on-campus Spartan Gym. Starting in 1961, the team also played home games at the off-campus San Jose Civic Auditorium. From 1976 to 1979, the Spartans played their home games at Independence High School, as the Civic Auditorium was being remodeled. The team resumed play at the Civic beginning in the 1979–80 season. In 1989, the on-campus Provident Credit Union Event Center became the primary home for San Jose State basketball.

The Spartans first defeated a top-20 nationally ranked team in 1969 when they defeated No. 2 Santa Clara. Other victories over ranked opponents include wins over No. 5 Long Beach State in 1973, No. 14 Virginia in 1979, and No. 19 Alabama in 1996.

The Spartans have spent a total of three weeks ranked in the Associated Press top-20 poll including one post-season ranking.

=== Conference championships ===
- California Coast Conference: 1925, 1928
- Far West Conference: 1929, 1931
- Northern California Athletic Conference: 1938
- California Collegiate Athletic Association: 1941 (co-champion), 1948, 1949
- Pacific Coast Athletic Association: 1980
- Big West Conference: 1996

=== Recent coaching hires ===
On March 29, 2013, San Jose State hired Boise State assistant coach Dave Wojcik to be the new head coach. Wojcik succeeded George Nessman, who was fired at the end of the 2012–2013 season. Wojcik resigned unexpectedly on July 11, 2017, for personal reasons, and assistant coach Rodney Tention was named interim head coach.

On August 4, 2017, San Jose State hired Colorado assistant Jean Prioleau. Four weeks later, forward Brandon Clarke, San Jose State's best player and reigning Mountain West Sixth Man of the Year award winner, transferred to Gonzaga. Clarke would eventually be a first-round draft pick in the 2019 NBA draft. Clarke's departure had an immediate effect on the team's performance, as the Spartans dropped to 4–26 (1–17 MW) in 2017–18 after compiling a 14–16 record in Wojcik's final season.

Prioleau was fired on March 12, 2021, after four seasons. He left San Jose State with a cumulative 20–93 (.177) overall record.

On April 6, 2021, San Jose State hired former Nebraska coach Tim Miles to take over as head coach at SJSU. Miles arrived at San Jose State with nearly 400 career wins (399–334) and over 24 years of head coaching experience.

== Conference affiliations ==
The San Jose State men's basketball team was affiliated to six different athletics conference prior to joining the Mountain West Conference in 2013.

- Independent (1909-1921)
- California Coast Conference (CCC) (1922-1928)
- Far Western Conference (FWC)/Northern California Athletic Conference (NCAC) (1929-1935)
- Independent (1936-1938)
- California Collegiate Athletic Association (CCAA) (1939-1949)
- Independent (1950-1951)
- California Basketball Association (CBA)/West Coast Athletic Conference (WCAC) (1952-1968)
- Pacific Coast Athletic Association (PCAA)/Big West Conference (BWC) (1969-1995)
- Western Athletic Conference (WAC) (1996-2012)
- Mountain West Conference (MWC) (2013-present)

== All-time record vs. current Mountain West teams ==
All-time series records through the 2023–24 season:

Opponent	Won	Lost	Tied	Percentage	Streak	First meeting
Air Force	13	13	0	.500	Won 4	1971
Boise State	4	41	0	.089	Lost 2	1988
Colorado State	2	25	0	.074	Lost 2	1969
Fresno State	82	101	0	.448	Lost 3	1916
Nevada	52	67	0	.437	Lost 2	1911
New Mexico	5	21	0	.192	Lost 3	1961
San Diego State	35	49	0	.417	Lost 13	1936
UNLV	8	47	0	.145	Lost 2	1983
Utah State	23	71	0	.245	Lost 2	1935
Wyoming	3	22	0	.120	Lost 2	1965
Totals	227	457	0	.332		

== AP poll rankings ==
As of March 2023, San Jose State has spent three weeks ranked among the top–25 college basketball teams in the nation in the Associated Press college basketball poll. This includes one post–season top–25 ranking.

Year	Weeks	Low	High	Final
1949–1950	3	19	17	17

== Postseason results ==
As of March 2023, the Spartans have an all-time post-season record of 1-6 through six tournament appearances.

=== NCAA tournament results ===
The Spartans have appeared in the NCAA tournament three times, with a combined record of 0–3.

Year	Seed	Round	Opponent	Result/Score
1951		Sweet Sixteen	BYU	L 61–68
1980	12 M	Round of 48	(5) #16 Missouri	L 51–61
1996	16 M	Round of 64	(1) #2 Kentucky	L 72–110

=== NIT results ===
The Spartans have appeared in two National Invitation Tournaments (NIT), with a combined record of 0–2.

Year	Round	Opponent	Result/Score
1981	First Round	UTEP	L 53–57
2025	First Round	Loyola Chicago	L 70–73

=== CBI results ===
The Spartans have appeared in two CBI tournaments. Their combined record is 1–2.

Year	Round	Opponent	Result/Score
2011	First Round	Creighton	L 74–85
2023	First Round; Quarterfinals	Southern Indiana; Radford	W 77–52; L 57–67

== Player awards and honors ==
=== Mountain West Basketball Player of the Year ===
- Omari Moore (2023)

=== Mountain West Sixth Man of the Year ===
- Brandon Clarke (2016)

== Coach awards and honors ==
=== Mountain West Basketball Coach of the Year ===
- Tim Miles (2023)

== Spartans in the NBA ==
Twelve former SJSU men's basketball players have been drafted into the NBA.

Year	Player	Team	Round
1950	Stu Inman	Chicago Stags	6th
1951	Bobby Crowe	Baltimore Bullets	9th
1969	Dick Groves	San Diego Rockets	16th
1970	Coby Dietrick	Golden State Warriors	10th
1971	Darnell Hillman	Golden State Warriors	1st
1980	Wally Rank	San Diego Clippers	5th
1982	Sid Williams	Portland Trail Blazers	9th
1982	Doug Murrey	Golden State Warriors	9th
1983	Chris McNealy	Kansas City-Omaha Kings	2nd
1988	Ricky Berry	Sacramento Kings	1st
1997	Tariq Abdul-Wahad	Sacramento Kings	1st
2019	Brandon Clarke	Memphis Grizzlies	1st
