= Lynbrook High School =

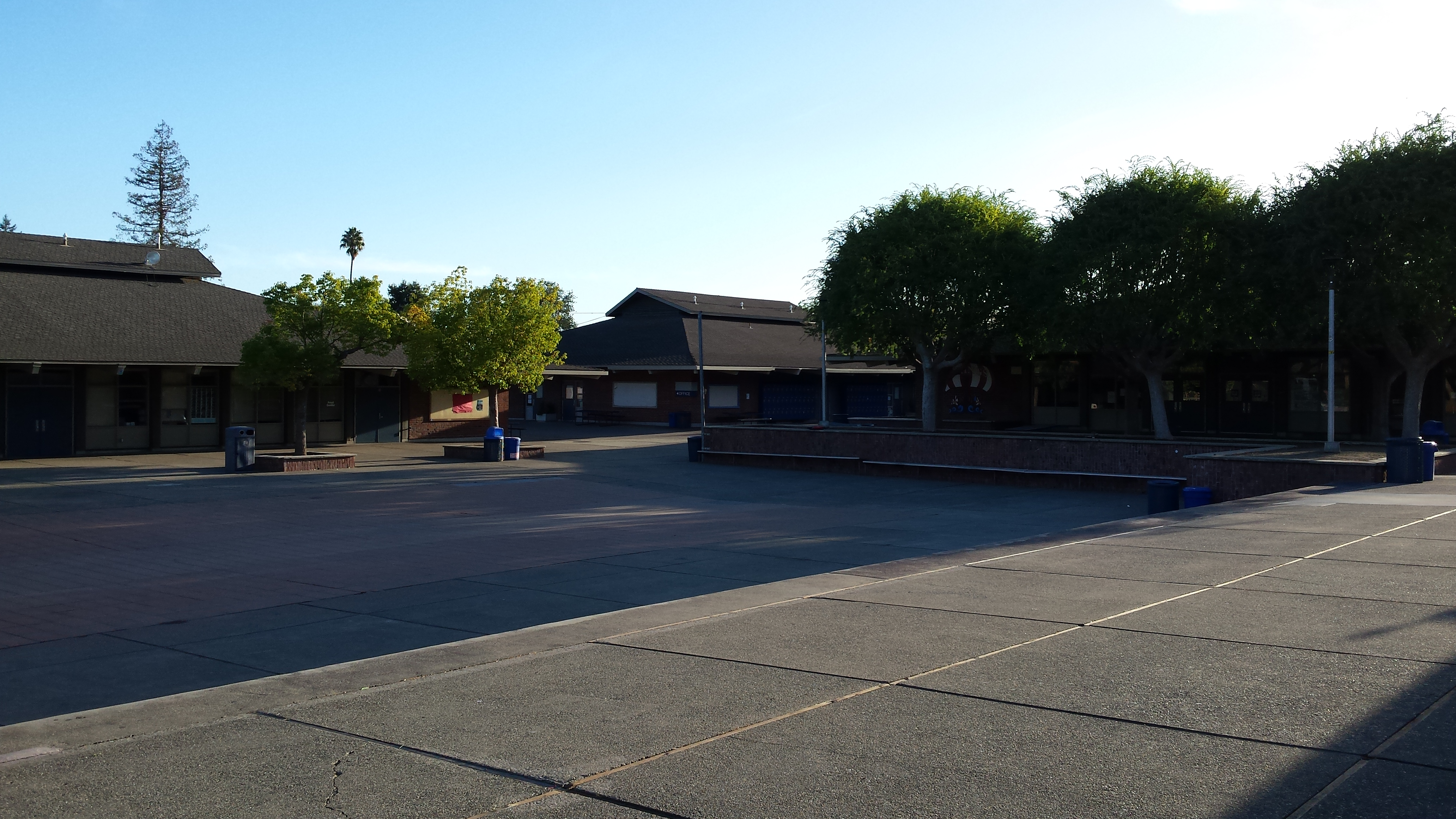

Location
- 1280 Johnson Avenue; San Jose, California 95129; United States; 37°18′00″N 122°00′18″W

Information
- Type: Public high school
- Motto: "Go Vikes!"
- Established: 1965; 61 years ago
- School district: Fremont Union High School District
- Principal: Janice Chen
- Teaching staff: 73.66 (FTE)
- Enrollment: 1,702 (2024–2025)
- Student to teacher ratio: 23.11
- Colors: Navy Blue, White, Red
- Athletics conference: Santa Clara Valley Athletic League; CIF Central Coast Section
- Team name: Vikings
- Accreditation: Western Association of Schools and Colleges
- USNWR ranking: 101 overall, 13th in STEM schools
- California Standards Test, English proficiency average: 93%
- Newspaper: The Epic
- Yearbook: Valhalla
- Website: lhs.fuhsd.org

Lynbrook High School (also referred to as Lynbrook or LHS) is a co-educational, public, four-year high school located in the West San Jose neighborhood of San Jose, California. It was founded in 1965 and graduated its first class in 1968.

Lynbrook is in the Fremont Union High School District along with Monta Vista High School, Cupertino High School, Fremont High School, and Homestead High School. It is fairly close to Miller Middle School. It is accredited by the Western Association of Schools and Colleges.

Several measures rank Lynbrook as one of the best high schools in the San Francisco Bay Area, California and the nation. In 2025, U.S. News ranked Lynbrook as the 86th best high school in the United States. Another report of public and private high schools by Business Insider and Niche ranked the students' average SAT/ACT scores as 7th nationwide. The Los Angeles Times ranked Lynbrook first among all public high schools in California using a similar metric. Separately, U.S. News & World Report ranked the school as the 17th best in the nation for Science, Technology, Engineering and Math (STEM). A larger percentage of its graduates are accepted into the University of California (UC) system than at any other school in the Fremont Union High School District.

== History ==
Lynbrook High School opened in the fall of 1965 on September 13, with an enrollment of 1,026 freshmen and sophomores.

Because Cupertino High School had grown very large by that time, a new school in the West San Jose area was constructed. Kendall Stanger was the first principal of the school. The school was technologically advanced around the time it was built and had closed-circuit television and air conditioning. During the first year, there was no gymnasium, locker room, or swimming pool. By the second school year, the gymnasium, locker room, and an Olympic-size swimming pool had been built.

== Campus ==
Many of Lynbrook's buildings and facilities are in their original state and have not been significantly renovated until 2019, when the quad and cafeteria was under construction for a year and finished renovations 2019. Construction for the gym and main student parking lot have been completed. However, the bleachers in the main gym were replaced between 2003 and 2006. Most of Lynbrook's buildings are constructed of old red brick exteriors. New structures and facilities built since 1990 include the library, swimming pool, field house, and special education buildings. During the summer in 2009, the parking lot was renovated and solar panels were added. In the fall of 2012, the football field and track was renovated, including new lights. The library has also been redesigned.

Lynbrook has a football field with a synthetic track around it, a baseball field, and a field hockey/soccer field, also known as Stober field. Lynbrook's Olympic-sized swimming pool is in excellent condition. During water polo season, Lynbrook's nine-lane swimming pool devotes about half of its area to non-lane-divided deep-water areas. The deep-water area is used mainly for water polo competitions. The pool was renovated in the summer of 2009, and no longer has diving boards. The softball and field hockey areas were renovated in 2006-2007. In 2024, the Rocklin Science Center was constructed.

A new building that houses the new weight room and dance studio was added west of the Field House during the 2017-2018 school year and opened for use in May 2018. This construction is the first of three stages of campus renovation. Stage two began in the summer of 2018 with the demolition of the quad, cafeteria, and old dance studio building. The new quad and cafeteria have since opened and when they have completed stage 3 of the renovation will begin with an added gym lobby, new main office, and a widespread re-arranging of building usage.

== Academics ==
Lynbrook has widely been known for consistently being one of the top 20 academic high schools in California for several years. Lynbrook's academic reputation has also influenced the real estate market in the surrounding neighborhood, causing home prices to rise higher than other neighborhoods in the San Jose area.

As of 2011, Lynbrook High School's base Academic Performance Index (API) is 943, which is 201 points higher than the state average for high schools, and is similar to those of Saratoga, Mission San Jose, and Monta Vista. The API ranking for Lynbrook High School is 19 out of 19, which is the best rating possible for any school, and its similar-schools API ranking is 9 out of 10. In 2008, Lynbrook was ranked 6th out of all public schools in the state of California, excluding magnet schools, based on API scores. In 2009, the U.S. News & World Report ranked Lynbrook as the 98th best high school in the United States. In 2007, the school scored a 10 out of 10 in both API Statewide and Similar School ranking.

Lynbrook students consistently receive high marks on standardized exams, including the SAT and Advanced Placement Exams. A report of public and private high schools by Business Insider and Niche ranked the students' average SAT/ACT scores as 7th nationwide. The Los Angeles Times ranked Lynbrook first among all public high schools in California using a similar metric. On the SAT Reasoning Test, the mean critical reading score for the class of 2012 was 636/800, the mean writing score was 668/800, and the mean mathematics score was 696/800. The mean composite score on the SAT was a 2000/2400. Out of 1585 tests taken by 672 students who took Advanced Placement Exams in May 2012, 57% scored a 5, the highest score possible, and 94% of the people passed by scoring a 3 or higher.

Lynbrook produced 62 National Merit semifinalists, and 93 commended students from the class of 2013, which is the highest proportion based on the size of the graduating class (431) out of all of the high schools in the Fremont Union High School District.

Between 1999 and 2018, Lynbrook High School students won 37 semi-finalist and 7 finalist awards in the Regeneron Science Talent Search. This was among the highest number of award winners of all high schools in the country.

93% of Lynbrook students passed the English-portion of the CAHSEE and 95% passed the mathematics portion.

Lynbrook has a relatively high proportion of high student GPA's, and the top 10 percent of students have a GPA from 3.97 to 4.00. More than half of all Lynbrook graduates attend the University of California, making Lynbrook one of the university's largest feeders. Not all students attend four-year colleges; about one-fourth attend two-year colleges such as nearby De Anza College before transferring to other institutions.

In 2009–2010, Lynbrook had a total of 6 semifinalists, two finalists, and one 2nd-place student from the Intel Science Talent Search, one of the most prestigious science competitions in America.

In 2010, Lynbrook had 8 qualifiers for the USAMO (USA Mathematical Olympiad) and 8 for the USAJMO (USA Junior Mathematical Olympiad), some of the most prestigious math competitions in the nation.

In 2011, Lynbrook was recognized at a Gala Dinner in Washington DC as an Intel School of Distinction Winner in science. Lynbrook is one of only six schools (two elementary, two middle and two high schools, each for either math or science) in the nation to receive this recognition.

== Athletics ==
Lynbrook is a member of the California Interscholastic Federation. It offers a total of 16 distinct varsity and JV sports, with sports split into two different seasons for girls and boys (such as tennis and volleyball) counted as one sport.

== Demographics ==
Like most other American high schools, Lynbrook is a four-year high school that consists of freshman, sophomore, junior, and senior classes. As of the 2023-2024 school year, Lynbrook High School had a total of 1,724 students, with 435 students belonging to the senior class of 2024.

84% of students are Asian and 7% are White. Lynbrook's student body is primarily Chinese American, with a similarly sized Indian American population.

=== School boundaries ===
Lynbrook High School's boundaries comprise the western part of West San Jose and parts of northern Saratoga. The school's area is bound to the north by Bollinger Road, to the east by Saratoga Creek, to the south by Cox Avenue, and to the west by De Anza Boulevard.

Currently, the Residency Verification policy states that all students who are enrolled in Lynbrook High School must be physically residing within the district's boundaries. The Residency Verification Anonymous Hotline is one of the district's ways of helping to enforce the policy (see Fremont Union High School District). However, a small number of students live elsewhere but are allowed enrollment due to lottery enrollment or by exceptions from the district.

== School technology ==
Lynbrook considers itself a technology-literate school which uses the Internet as the primary means of communication. As of 2020, in all schools within the Fremont Union High School District, teachers, administrators, and students use Schoology for announcements, discussions, assignments and schedules. Schoology can also be used for posting e-mail addresses and files.

Teachers use Turnitin, Infinite Campus, and other such websites to post grades and collect and evaluate papers.

The school library also has 36 public terminals for student use. Two computer labs in Rooms 005 and 006 are only for use by classes that have made appointments with the school, but students may access the computers during Monday and Thursday tutorial periods.

== Notable alumni ==
- Boris Bershteyn (Class of 1995) – Former acting Administrator of the Office of Information and Regulatory Affairs
- Vinay Bhat (Class of 2002) - Grandmaster of chess
- Gina Bianchini (Class of 1990) - Former CEO of Ning
- Sanjit Biswas (Class of 1998) - Former CEO and co-founder of Meraki, CEO and co-founder of Samsara
- Greg Camp (Class of 1985) - Former lead guitarist and songwriter for the band Smash Mouth
- Chris Cavanaugh (Class of 1980) - Former Olympic swimmer, winning the gold medal in the 4 × 100 m freestyle relay at the 1984 Summer Olympics
- Daniel Howland (Class of 2011) - DJ and producer who performs under the name Svdden Death
- Hua Hsu (Class of 1995) - Professor, writer, and Pulitzer Prize winner
- Bill Jolitz (Class of 1975) - With wife Lynne developed the 386BSD operating system
- Craig Juntunen (Class of 1974) - Former CFL quarterback
- Eesha Khare (Class of 2013) - Inventor
- Richard Kim (Class of 1999) - Korean-American car designer, known for his work on the BMW i3 and i8 electric cars
- Brian Matthew Krzanich (Class of 1978) - Former CEO of Intel
- Kurt Kuenne (Class of 1990) - Filmmaker and composer known for the documentary Dear Zachary
- Chris Larsen (Class of 1979) - Co-Founder & Executive Chairman of Ripple (payment protocol)
- Jeremy Atherton Lin (Class of 1992) - Author
- Kristie Lu Stout (Class of 1992) - CNN International Anchor and Correspondent
- Danny Weinkauf (Class of 1982) - musician, current bassist for They Might Be Giants
- Tony Xu (Class of 2003) - CEO and co-Founder of DoorDash
- Charlie Yin (Class of 2007) - Electronic music producer who performs under the name Giraffage
