= Cupertino High School =

Public high school in California, United States

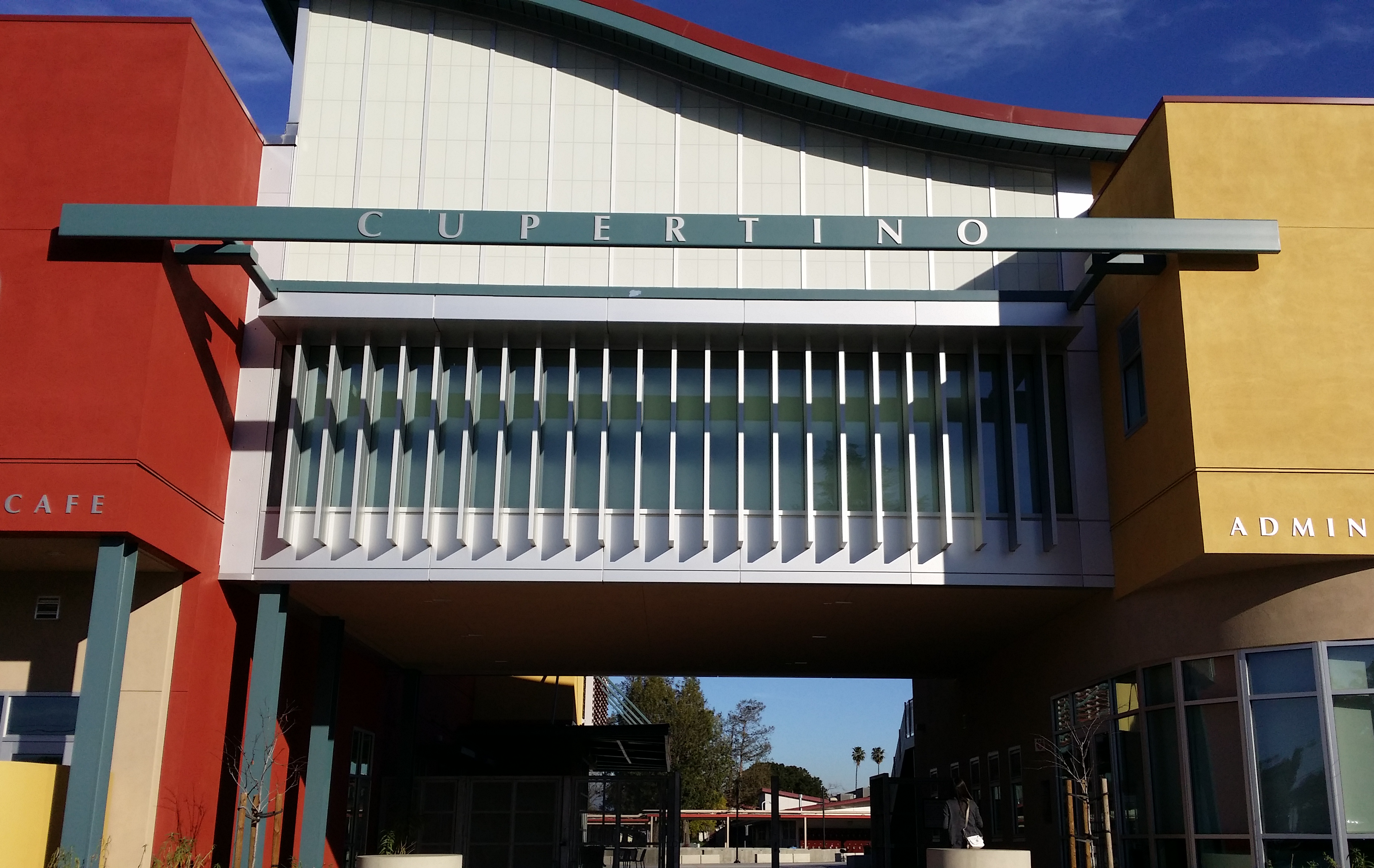

Location
- 10100 Finch Avenue; Cupertino, California 95014; United States; 37°19′16″N 122°00′34″W

Information
- School type: Public four-year
- Established: 1958
- School district: Fremont Union High School District (FUHSD)
- Principal: Yukari Salazar
- Faculty: 78.54 (on an FTE basis)
- Enrollment: 1,800 (2024-25)
- Student to teacher ratio: 22.92
- Colors: Cardinal, gold, gray
- Athletics conference: Santa Clara Valley Athletic League; CIF Central Coast Section
- Mascot: Dusty the Pioneer
- Nickname: Pioneers
- Accreditation: Western Association of Schools and Colleges
- Newspaper: The Prospector
- Yearbook: Nugget
- Website: chs.fuhsd.org

Cupertino High School, colloquially referred to as "Tino", is a four-year comprehensive public high school located near the Rancho Rinconada and Fairgrove neighborhoods of Cupertino, California, USA. The school serves mostly suburban residential and areas in eastern Cupertino, southern Santa Clara, and west San Jose.

Cupertino High School is part of the Fremont Union High School District along with Monta Vista High School, Lynbrook High School, Fremont High School, and Homestead High School. Two main feeder schools, Lawson Middle School and Hyde Middle School, are the closest middle schools and are both part of the Cupertino Union School District. The school serves the areas of Sunnyvale, Santa Clara, San Jose and Cupertino.

Cupertino High is accredited by the Western Association of Schools and Colleges.

== History ==
Cupertino High School opened on September 15, 1958, with a student population of 694 ninth and tenth graders and 28 staff members, with George Fernandez as principal. At its inception, Cupertino High originally contained four classroom buildings, a school office, and a cafeteria. Other buildings weren't fully complete at the time of its opening, leaving vacant lots at the back of the school as well as its sides.

In 1971, Robert L. Gomez and a group of family started the Tournament of Bands: an annual event where high school marching bands come together and compete.

In 2009, in an effort to increase sustainability, the school built solar panels in the front staff parking lot.

In 2010, most of the athletic fields were gradually demolished one by one.

On January 3, 2014, the renovated school building opened to the public, connected to the original gym and theater. It is made up of new bathrooms, a library, a new computer lab, and a new cafeteria. The main office was replaced along with the guidance and counseling offices.

In 2017, Cupertino High opened two new buildings (6000-7000) that include new classrooms, lawns, and a mini-quad within the building's center. The building consists of 22 classrooms, a Career and Technical Education lab and six modern science classrooms.

In 2020, the school building closed due to the COVID-19 pandemic and transitioned into remote learning. 2020 spring semester grades were changed to the Pass / No Pass system. The school reopened for the 2021 - 2022 school year. In March 2022, the mask mandate was removed in response to changes in California law.

From 2024 to 2026, Bill Schloss served as the principal of Cupertino High School. The enrollment was, in 2024, 2,112 students. The school's current principal, as of 2026, is Yukari Salazar. Over the same time period from 2024 to 2026, the school's enrollment declined to around 1,800 students.

== Campus ==
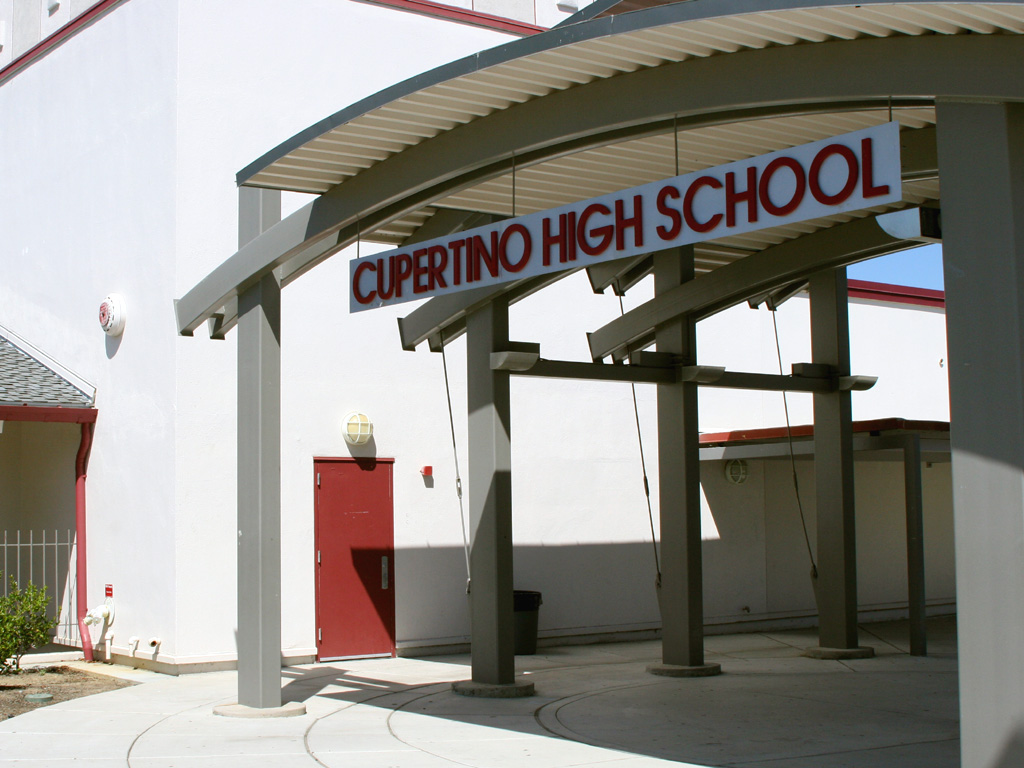
Cupertino High School Main Gate in 2014

There is a football field at the southern end of the campus (rubber track and American football field). The gymnasium, swimming pool, baseball field, soccer/field hockey/softball field and tennis courts reside between the football field and the classroom in the southern part of the school.

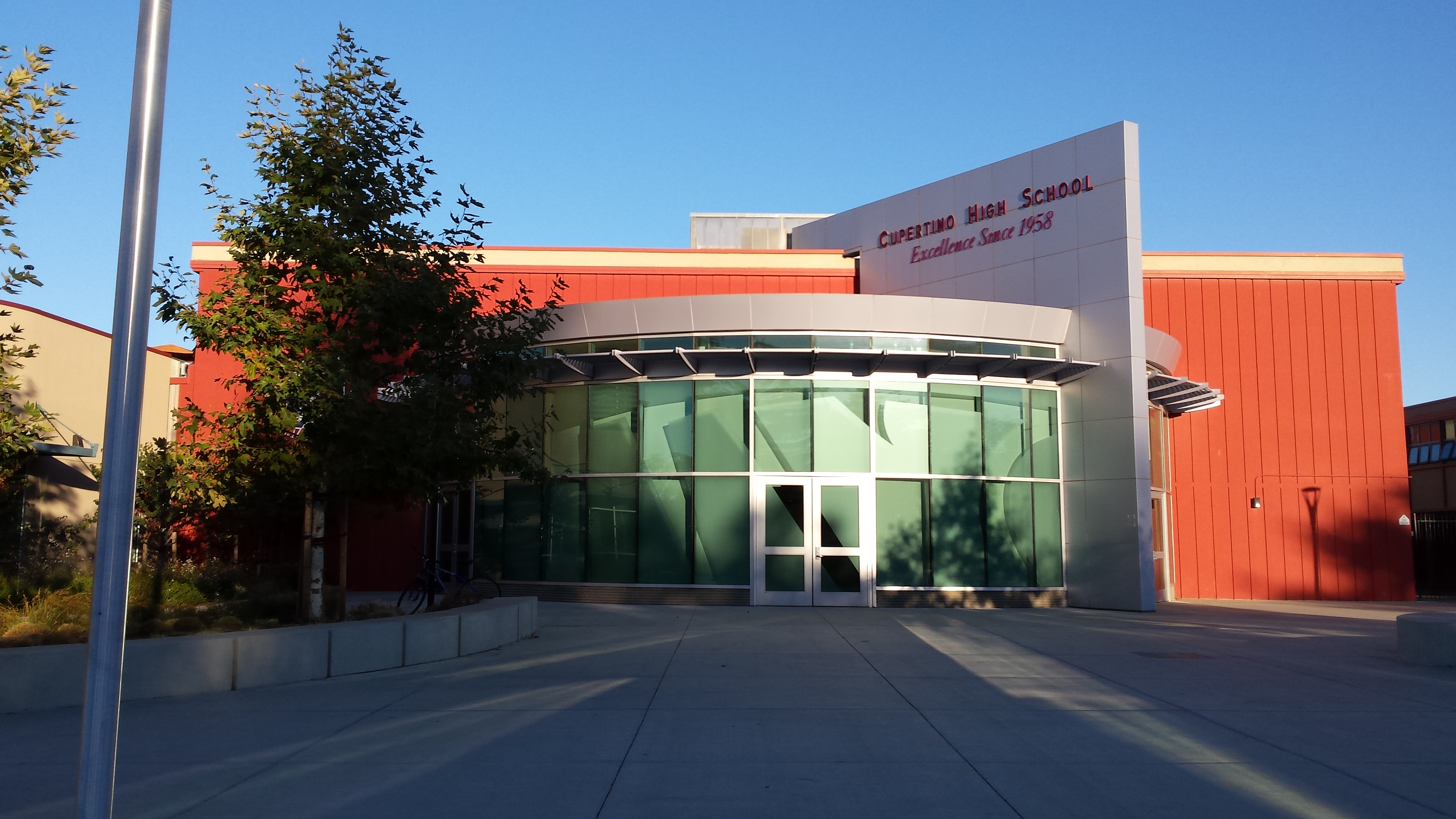
Cupertino High School Gym west entrance

The Cupertino High School quad centers most student activities including clubs day, spirit week, and fairs. Club day is an event where Cupertino High School clubs presents their club and fundraises. Spirit weeks are weeks where students dress up in different styles, often pertaining to a theme, and participate in school events.

There is a main cafeteria next to the quad which includes a kitchen and seating available in two floors. There is also a career center are located on the other side of the quad. Connecting the two buildings is a glass bridge which mainly consists of a library, but also including a computer lab, conference rooms, and a staff counseling office.

The main gym hosts rallies and large speaker events. Rallies are spirit events the school hosts multiple times a year. Notable rallies include the Homecoming Rally, Hall of Fame Rally, and the Senior Send off Rally.

Cupertino High School has a theater for its performing arts programs (Drama, Band, Orchestra). The theater was named after Robert L. Gomez for his contributions to Cupertino High School's music education.

== Statistics ==
=== Demographics ===
2024-2025

- 1800 students

Asian	White	Hispanic	Two or more races	African American	Pacific Lander	American Indian
71%	9.3%	11%	7.6%	0.39%	0.17%	0.11%

== Academics ==
Cupertino High School has a strong academic program and is ranked the top 50 high school in California. The high school is more STEM focused due to its location in Silicon Valley.

Cupertino High School has above average standardized test scores in the SAT and ACT. In 2022, there were 38 National Merit Semifinalist and 62 National Commended.

=== Mathematics ===
Cupertino High School offers many courses in Math ranging from Algebra 1 to AP Calculus BC. There are many pathways students can take depending on the student's level of math, but the two primary pathways are regular and honors/AP, generally associated with what level of post-secondary education the student aims to pursue. Students typically start in Algebra 1, Geometry, Geometry Enriched, Algebra 2, or Algebra 2/Trigonometry in ninth grade. There are honors courses equivalent for each level of math (Geometry vs. Geometry Enriched; Algebra 2 vs. Algebra 2/Trig; Pre Calculus vs. Pre Calculus Honors; AP Calculus AB vs. AP Calculus BC). Students who have completed AP Calculus BC can take Multivariable Calculus, Linear Algebra, Differential Equations, and more through the dual enrollment program in De Anza College or West Valley College. There are other courses available like AP Statistics and Applications of Advanced Mathematics.

=== Science ===
Science is another significant department in Cupertino High School. There are AP courses offered in all three of the major sciences (Biology, Chemistry, and Physics). In addition, there is also AP Environmental Science and Science and Society. Most science courses are taught in the old science building (500s) or the new science building (6000s - 7000s) with a higher concentration of AP classes taught in the old science building. AP Physics C is offered by putting both AP Physics C: Mechanics and AP Physics C: Electricity & Magnetism into one year (each of the two is approximately a semester long).

=== World languages ===
There are four languages offered at Cupertino High School: Chinese, Japanese, Spanish, and French. Every language has classes for five levels (level 4 is honors and level 5 is AP). Students typically start with Level 1 or 2, depending on whether or not they have taken a class in the same language in middle school.

=== Other programs ===
Cupertino High School includes special programs like AVID, Terra Nova, and Special Education.

AVID is a high school program designed to prepare students for success in four year universities. The goal of the program is to teach organization, leadership, and academic skills.

Terra Nova is another high school program designed for high potential students who need additional support during the school day.

== Extracurriculars ==
Cupertino High School has many extracurricular activities and programs for its students.

=== Academic Olympiad ===
Cupertino High School hosts multiple competitions including USNCO, USAPHO, USABO and the AMC competitions (AMC 10, AMC 12, and AIME). In 2021 a Cupertino High School student competed in the IMO.

=== USACO ===
Cupertino High School hosts a competitive programming club designed to support students in the USACO competition.

=== Robotics team ===
The Cupertino High School Robotics team was established in 2007. Currently, robotics is a significant organization in Cupertino High School with over 200 members and 8 mentors. There are three programs within: FIRST Lego League Challenge, FIRST Tech Challenge, and FIRST Robotics Competition.

In 2025, construction began on a new, modernized robotics facility to serve all five schools in the Fremont Union High School District on the school's campus. The facility is designed by Quattrocchi Kwok Architects (QKA) and built by Landmark Construction, with Blach Construction serving as construction manager, and is set to be inaugurated in the fall of 2026.

The FRC Team is called The Goldstrikers (2473). There are 4 FTC Teams as of 2022 (4950, 6038, 7128, 7610).

== Clubs ==
There are around 60 clubs in Cupertino High School. Clubs revolve around different interest and ranges in sizes from a dozen to hundreds of students. There are many Honor Societies, Service Clubs, and STEM clubs.

=== FBLA ===
FBLA is one of the largest clubs on campus with around 130+ students. The club focuses on competition in 70 different fields and projects that teaches FBLA principles. The club houses connection to Lawson Middle School and Hyde Middle School for its middle school program.

=== Tinovation ===
Tinovation is the largest Computer Science Club at Cupertino High.

The club focuses on educating students on Computer Science. The club builds a range of projects every year.

Due to Cupertino High's proximity with Apple and Silicon Valley, there is a high number of students interested in computer science, and other clubs have been formed to address individual interests which are listed below.

- Tino Competitive Club
- Tino Game Development Club
- CHS Women In Tech
- CHS Girls Who Code

=== Service clubs ===
Service clubs in Cupertino High encourages students to volunteer in the local community. Some clubs offer the President's Volunteer Service Award for completing a required number of hours.

=== STEM clubs ===
Stem clubs make up a large portion of all clubs on campus. Clubs usually focus on STEM concepts and partake in events.

The Tino Math Club helps students in the AMC competitions.

=== Language honor societies ===
There is an honor society for each of the four languages (Mandarin, Japanese, French and Spanish) offered in Cupertino High School. Students in the Honor Society usually host cultural events, volunteer, take national language exams, and encourage learning about foreign culture.

== Performing arts ==
=== Marching band ===
Cupertino High School has a marching band named Cupertino High School Proud Pioneer Marching Band. The band is currently led by Gilbert Iruegas.

Cupertino High hosts the Tournament of Bands (TOB): an annual event where high school bands come together and compete. The event happens on the second Saturday of October annually. In 2021, Cupertino High hosted The 50th annual Tournament of Bands on Saturday, October 9, 2021.

Other music programs include Concert Band, Symphonic Band, and Wind Ensemble.

=== Winter Percussion ===
Winter Percussion was established in 2016 for students to continue professional percussion training. The Winter Percussion students compete in local NCPA and WGI competitions. In 2022, Cupertino High School Winter Percussion competed in the Winter Guard International (WGI) Championships in Dayton, OH, and placed 6th in the scholastic world category.

=== Cupertino Actors Theatre ===
Cupertino High School has an award-winning drama program, Cupertino Actors Theatre, that produces plays and musicals, provides educational theatre workshops for English classes, and many opportunities for performance and design for students considering a career in the performing arts.

== Publications ==
=== Newspaper and magazines ===
The official Cupertino High School newspaper is The Prospector. The prospector publishes eight print issues yearly and online.

There are also other unofficial student publications such as the Cupertino Science Magazine and the Philosophy Magazine.

=== Yearbook ===
Cupertino High School's yearbook is The Nugget. In 2013, The Nugget won back-to-back consecutive Gold Crown Awards at the CSPCA in New York City, as well as the Pacemaker Award at the Spring NSPA Conference in San Francisco.

== Athletics ==
Cupertino High School is a member of the California Interscholastic Federation and participates in the Santa Clara Valley Athletic League. The school offers sports in three seasons (fall, winter, and spring) with most sports separated by boys and girls. Sports offered are listed below.

- Badminton
- Baseball
- Basketball
- Cheerleading
- Color guard
- Cross country
- Dance
- Field hockey
- Football
- Golf
- Gymnastics
- Marching band
- Soccer
- Softball
- Swimming
- Tennis
- Track and field
- Volleyball
- Water polo
- Winter guard
- Winter percussion
- Wrestling

Cupertino High School's main rival school is considered to be Monta Vista High School through the Helmet Game, a game started in 1985 with Cupertino High and Monta Vista High.

=== Dance ===
Cupertino High School has multiple dance teams from different student organizations. The main dance team is the Golden Spurs. There is also a K-pop Dance Team from KASA (Korean American Student Association). The K-pop dance group has a YouTube channel with 4.5 million views. Both teams regularly perform at rallies and sports events.

== Curriculum ==
=== APs and honors ===
Currently, Cupertino High School offers 18 AP Courses and seven different honor courses.

=== Graduation requirements ===
Cupertino High School runs on a semester system. 220 credits are the minimum necessary to graduate from Cupertino High School. Five credits are awarded for each semester class completed. Sports are considered to be five credits.

CONTENT AREA	CREDITS
English	40
Social studies	30
Mathematics	20
Science	20
Physical education	20
Electives	70
Selective electives*	20

== Achievements ==
=== Honors and accolades ===
In 1996, Cupertino high School was awarded the National Blue Ribbon Award for public and private K–12 schools that are either academically superior in their states or that demonstrate dramatic gains in student achievement.

Cupertino High was named a California Distinguished School by the California Department of Education in the years 1990, 1994, 2007, and 2021 based on its efforts to support impoverished students and student body success.

As of 2023, it is ranked 312th in the U.S. News Best High School rankings, 40th in California, and 23rd for STEM high schools nationwide.

=== Student achievements ===
Cupertino High's 2010 graduating senior class was awarded $100,000 by Dell for a SuperProm. For four years the class decided that, rather than fundraising for junior and senior prom, they would raise funds for the Nthimbiri Secondary School in Kenya, and pledged to collect $100,000, calling the project Kenya Dream. In early 2010, the senior class came across Dell's SuperProm contest and submitted a video to possibly win the contest and also increase awareness of Kenya Dream. The seniors competed against 200+ schools across the country and won with 32,145 votes.

== Notable alumni ==
=== Sports ===
- John Hencken – Olympic swimmer, medalling at the 1972 and 1976 Summer Olympics
- Dan Kutler – Olympic swimmer
- Kurt Rambis – NBA basketball player and coach
- Eva Lee – badminton competitor at the 2008 Summer Olympics
- Christopher Sullivan – professional soccer player, member of the U.S. national team

=== Entertainment, news media, and music ===
- Doug Ferrari – comedian
- Nina Garbiras – actress
- Bryan "Brain" Mantia – musician, drums
- Azadeh Moaveni – journalist and author
- Renée Montagne – host, Morning Edition, NPR
- Peter Shin (1989) – film director
- Mohammad Gorjestani (2002) – film director

=== Politics ===
- John Doolittle – Congressman from California's 4th congressional district
- Fred Keeley – Assemblyman, California's 27th State Assembly district

=== Academia ===
- Lawrence H. Keeley — archaeologist, researcher, and professor

=== Business ===
- Patria Jafferies (1970) – businesswoman and restaurant owner; co-founder of Dôme

== Notable staff and faculty ==
- Stu Pederson, MLB player, former frosh/soph head baseball coach at Cupertino
- Tom Dooley, Olympic Racewalker, Track Coach
