= Homestead High School (California) =

Public secondary school in Cupertino, California, United States

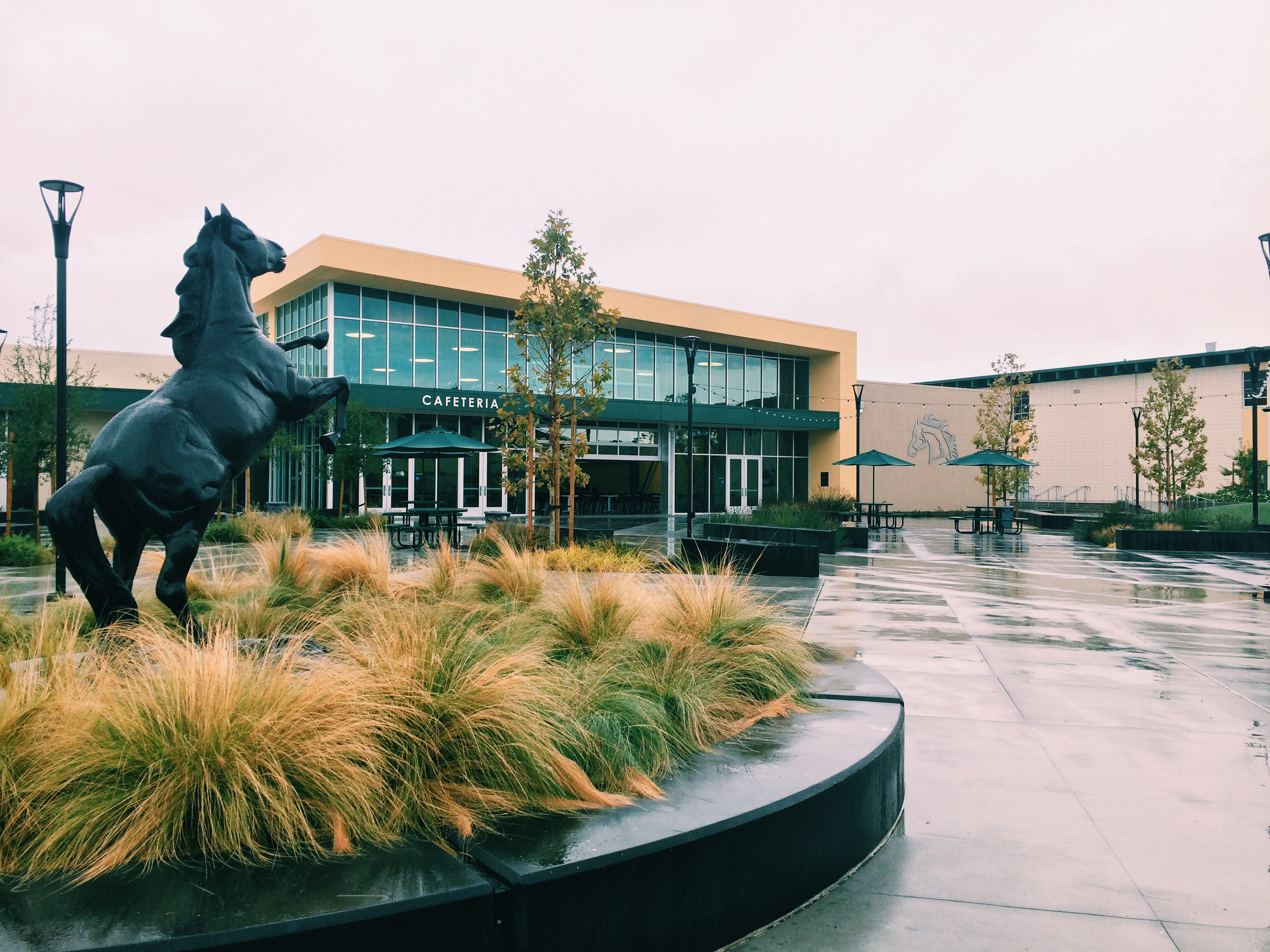

Location
- 21370 Homestead Road; Cupertino, California 95014; United States; 37°20′10″N 122°2′55″W

Information
- Type: Public 4-year comprehensive
- Established: 1962; 64 years ago
- CEEB code: 053462
- Principal: Dr. Denae Nurnberg
- Staff: 98.31 (FTE)
- Grades: 9–12
- Enrollment: 2,262 (2023–2024)
- Student to teacher ratio: 23.01
- Campus: Suburban
- Colors: Green and White
- Athletics conference: Santa Clara Valley Athletic League; CIF Central Coast Section
- Team name: Mustangs
- Rival: Fremont High School
- Accreditation: Western Association of Schools and Colleges
- Newspaper: The Epitaph
- Yearbook: Pegasus
- Website: Homestead High School

Homestead High School is a four-year public high school serving western Sunnyvale, southern Los Altos, and northwestern Cupertino, in Santa Clara County, California, United States. Established in 1962, the school serves 2,405 students in grades nine to twelve as part of the Fremont Union High School District. In 2003 and 2009, the California Department of Education recognized Homestead as a California Distinguished School, and in 2004, the Department of Education recognized Homestead as a Blue Ribbon School.

== History ==
Homestead High School has played a large role in the development of Silicon Valley. The school's electronics class is considered as influential as Frederick Terman's program at Stanford University.

== Campus ==
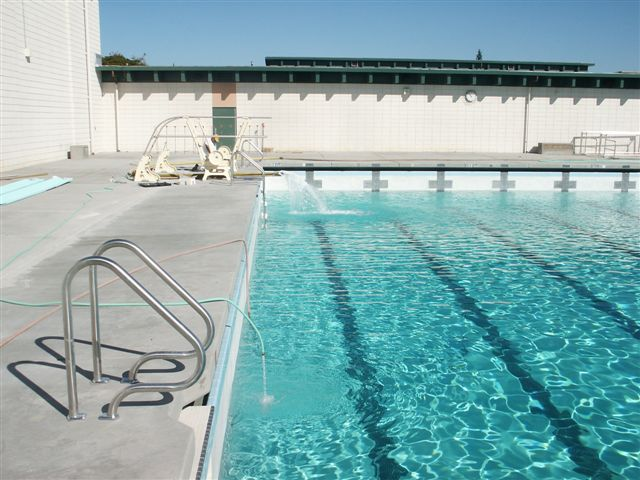
Homestead High School's swimming pool.

Homestead High School is bordered by Homestead Road to the north and Interstate 280 to the south. Beginning in the summer of 2009, solar panels and shade structures were added over both parking lots, and the fields were reorganized so that a new stadium could be constructed. The other half of campus, facing Homestead Road, consists of several school buildings. The majority of the buildings have an inner corridor with outdoor corridors connecting the buildings. Green-colored hoofmarks decorate Homestead's sidewalks and walkways, which are from the school's team name and one of the school's colors. The front walls of the school are decorated with murals of a similar theme, including a large mural of a mustang.

== Demographics ==
The bar graph below represents the increase in enrolling students between the years 2003 and 2018.

HHS student enrollment by year
Year	Enrollment
2004	1,844
2005	1,823
2006	2,001
2007	2,089
2008	2,270
2009	2,242
2010	2,240
2011	2,190
2012	2,270
2013	2,311
2014	2,367
2015	2,270
2016	2,379
2017	2,395
2018	2,459

As of the 2022 school year, the racial composition was as follows:

- Asian: 44.9%
- White: 27.3%
- Hispanic: 15.6%
- Other: 12.2%

== Academics ==
=== Music department and marching band ===
Homestead has a music program consisting of more than a dozen performing groups, including concert bands, a jazz ensemble, a marching band, choral groups, string and symphonic ensembles, and extracurricular performing arts groups such as winter guard and winter percussion. The marching band has enjoyed a continuous run of championship awards, starting in 1993 with their field show rendition of The Phantom of the Opera. Since then, the Mighty Mustang Marching Band has performed such shows as The Who's Tommy, and Miss Saigon. In their first statewide competition in 2005, the band tied for 6th place in the 5A division at the Western Band Association State Championships. In April 2010, Homestead's marching band was one of only 10 high schools nationwide selected to participate in the 2011 Macy's Thanksgiving Day Parade in New York City. In 2010, Homestead's marching band finished in 3rd overall at WBA Grand Championships with a score of 91.22, the highest placement and score in school history. In November 2015, the band traveled to their first appearance at the Bands of America Grand National Championships and finished 19th-place as a semifinalist, out of 95 bands. On November 19, 2017, Homestead's Marching Band placed 3rd overall at the 2017 WBA Grand Championships with a score of 94.15, the highest score in Homestead history. On New Year's Day 2018, the band participated at the 129th Annual Tournament of Roses Parade. The band was later selected to perform again at the 136th rose parade, on January 1, 2025.

The jazz, vocal, string and wind ensembles consistently rank Superior in competitions. Many of the musical groups have traveled internationally. The Wind Ensemble and Orchestra performed in Carnegie Hall at the 2007 New York Band and Orchestra Festival, winning Silver Awards for each group. Participating in the 2009 Australian International Music Festival held in the Sydney Opera House on a trip to New Zealand and Australia, the Wind Symphony received a Gold Award, and the Jazz Ensemble received a Silver Award.

=== Economics Challenge ===
In 2015, Homestead placed first nationally in the David Ricardo division of the National Economics Challenge.

=== Mathematics competitions ===
Members of the mathematics team have regularly qualified for the American Invitational Mathematics Examination (AIME). Over the years, the team has placed among the top 10 schools in the Mu Alpha Theta National Log 1 Mathematics Contest, taking fifth place nationally in 2009–10, third place in 2008–09, ninth place in 2007–08, and fourth place in 2006 and 2007. From 2003 through 2006, Homestead's math team placed among the top 10 teams nationally in the Ciphering Time Trials, a contest sponsored by National Assessment & Testing. During this period, Homestead's team also placed among the top 20 teams in several other contests sponsored by National Assessment & Testing, including the Team Scramble, the Four-by-Four, and the Collaborative Problem Solving Contests. In 2002, the Mathematical Association of America's American Mathematics Competition (AMC) awarded the Edyth May Sliffe Award for Excellence in Teaching to Homestead teacher and team faculty advisor Steve Headley.

=== Science Bowl ===
Homestead has a team competing in the Science Bowl, a competition sponsored by the U.S. Department of Energy. Over the years, Homestead students have won awards at the National Chemistry Olympiad and the National Science Bowl. Teacher Gareth Wong initially organized and advised the team, and, in 2002, the American Chemical Society recognized his work with a High School Teacher Award for the Western Region. The team is not currently advised by any teacher. On February 10, 2007, Homestead's team won the regional competition held at the SLAC National Accelerator Laboratory, eventually repeating their regional victory on February 2, 2008. At the 2007 National Science Bowl Competition in Washington, D.C., Homestead's team placed 12th out of more than 60 high-school teams, winning a $1,000 prize for the school's science department. In 2009, Homestead made it to the National competition for the third time in a row. At the National Science Bowl Competition, they placed in the top eight out of 67 other high schools.

== Athletics ==
Homestead athletic teams compete in the SCVAL. The athletic fields and gymnasiums at Homestead underwent reconstruction in 2015–2016, and now boast a state of the art football field with a jumbotron, a new Field House gymnasium, the original gymnasium, and a newly constructed artificial turf baseball field.

Homestead has teams in the following sports:

- Badminton
- Baseball
- Basketball
- Cheerleading
- Color guard
- Cross country
- Dance
- Diving
- Field hockey
- Football
- Golf
- Marching band
- Soccer
- Softball
- Swimming
- Tennis
- Track and field
- Volleyball
- Water polo
- Winter guard
- Winter percussion
- Wrestling

Baseball

The Baseball program at Homestead has fielded many collegiate and pro players over the years, including Scott Erickson, a Major League pitcher. The original baseball program was under the direction of Chuck Camuso, a longtime mentor and leader, who received the CCS Coaches Honor Award in 1993–1994. The baseball team plays its games at the Chuck Camuso Baseball field, a state of the art artificial turf field which was dedicated to the longtime coach in 2014.

Soccer

Homestead Mustang Soccer hosts a Winter Tournament, the Christmas Cup, on a yearly basis at Mustang Field. This tournament brings in highly ranked boys soccer teams from around the valley and has been in existence for over 20 years. The 2018 Varsity Women's Soccer Team made it to the second level of the CCS finals, where they were defeated by St. Francis High School. The Homestead team had an award-winning season, including beating top runner Palo Alto.

Tennis

In the 2024 Spring athletic season, the Homestead Mustang Boys Varsity Tennis recorded a 20-3 win/loss record, becoming the SCVAL De Anza League champions in the process. In the subsequent CCS Sectional Championships, the Homestead Mustangs defeated Saratoga High School to become the CCS Boys Varsity Team Tennis champions for the first time since 1990. As the CCS champions, the Mustangs were invited to play in the CIF Northern Regional championships, where they lost to California High School in the championship game.

Track and field

Homestead's distance runners broke a number of records in the late 1960s. They set the national postal 2-mile postal record on November 9, 1968. Five runners averaged 9:26 for two-mile (19 meters longer than the now standard 3200m). In total, 11 Homestead runners broke ten minutes that day. The runners contributing to the national record of 47:11.2 were Jack Christianson (9:17.0), Mike Ferguson (9:17.2), Tom Brassell (9:26.0), Steve Flynn (9:35.4), and John Hanes (9:35.6). The track and field and cross country teams are both headed by coach Kenrick Sealy.

== Notable alumni ==
Homestead has a direct connection to the development of Apple Computer (now Apple Inc.). Co-founders Steve Jobs '72 and Steve Wozniak '68 both graduated from Homestead, as did the early Apple employee who introduced them to each other, Bill Fernandez '72, as well as early employees Chris Espinosa '78 and Randy Wigginton (who graduated from Bellarmine College Preparatory). Another graduate was Chrisann Brennan, who was Jobs's first girlfriend (also an early employee of Apple) and the mother of his first child, Lisa Brennan-Jobs.

Additional notable Homestead alumni include:

- 3PAC '09, former Comedy hip-hop rapper and YouTuber
- Jahine Arnold '91, former NFL wide receiver
- Jeff Baicher '87, former US National Team Soccer Player, MLS player, Western Soccer League, and American Professional Soccer League player
- Smith Cho, actress
- Doug Clarey '72, former MLB infielder
- Katarina Comesaña '10, former footballer for the Peru women's national football team
- Artemis Dafni '01, former Olympian swimmer
- Sean Dawkins '89, former NFL wide receiver
- Adragon De Mello '94, former youngest college graduate in the U.S. at age 11, who later returned to Sunnyvale Middle School and then subsequently graduated Homestead High School
- Scott Erickson '86, former MLB pitcher
- Leslie Fu '10, YouTube streamer
- Dan Gordon '78, co-founder of Gordon Biersch Brewery
- Linda Jezek, 1976 Summer Olympics swimmer 400 m relay silver medalist
- Eric Ly, co-founder of LinkedIn
- Evan Marshall '08, former MLB pitcher
- Fred Ramsdell '79, winner of 2025 Nobel Prize in Physiology or Medicine
- Daniel Seddiqui '00, cultural analyst and job hunting expert who worked 50 jobs in 50 states
- Jeff Sevy, former NFL lineman
- Michael D. Shear '86, White House correspondent for the New York Times, Pulitzer prizewinning former journalist for the Washington Post
- Tony Sly '89, singer, songwriter and guitarist, best known as the frontman of the punk rock band No Use for a Name
- Jerry Smith, head coach of Santa Clara Broncos women's soccer, coached Homestead's boys soccer team for seven seasons from 1980-1986
- Drew Strotman '14, professional baseball pitcher
- Bernie Su, writer, producer of Emmy-winning web series The Lizzie Bennet Diaries
- Jillian Weir '10, former Olympic-qualifying hammer thrower
- Sandy Wihtol '73, former MLB pitcher
- Phil Yu, founder of Angry Asian Man
