= Adragon De Mello =

American college graduate at age 11

- Born: October 8, 1976 (age 49)
- Education: University of California, Santa Cruz
- Known for: Being a child prodigy

Adragon De Mello (born October 8, 1976) is an American prodigy who graduated from the University of California, Santa Cruz with a degree in computational mathematics in 1988, at age 11. At the time, he was the youngest college graduate in U.S. history, a record that was later broken in 1994 by Michael Kearney.

== Childhood ==
Adragon was the only child of Cathy Gunn and Agustin Eastwood De Mello (1929–2003). The elder De Mello was a karate master, flamenco guitarist, and former weightlifting champion. He was obsessed with his son's academic achievements and was prone to "scary" fits of anger. Sometimes, if his partner or his son did not comply with his demands, the father threatened suicide. His father planned an ideal life for a "boy genius" before Adragon was born; it included not only graduating from college early, but also getting a doctorate in physics by age 12, winning the Nobel Prize in Physics by age 16, being elected a senator by age 20 (US senators must be at least 30 years old), becoming president of the United States by age 26 (the minimum age set by the US Constitution is 35), then head of a world government by age 30, and chairman of an intergalactic government after that. Since his father had set the goal that his son would become a Nobel Prize winner by age 16, he obsessively pushed his son in mathematics and other academic subjects from an early age. For example, when doing math homework, his father insisted that he solve an equation five times, even when he got the correct answer on the first attempt.

Adragon De Mello's father also sought publicity for his son. In 1987, while at university, Adragon and his father were interviewed by Morley Safer on 60 Minutes II. They also appeared on 48 Hours and The Tonight Show. During these interviews, Adragon would repeat the goals his father had chosen, saying he wanted to get a Ph.D. in physics and win a Nobel Prize by age 16 or 17.

When his father enrolled him in Popper-Keizer, a school for gifted children, standardized tests Adragon took suggested he was around the 85th percentile for students his age, where most students enrolled in such schools were in the 95th percentile. His father removed him from the school for gifted students "after tests showed the boy was less gifted than his father believed".

In 1981, Adragon joined Mensa. He has also been a member of Intertel, another organization for people with high intelligence.

After attending seven different elementary schools in the space of just three years, Adragon enrolled in Cabrillo College for two years starting in 1984. After that, he transferred to UC–Santa Cruz. While he did graduate from university in 1988, some of his math teachers later claimed that his grades were borderline.

Adragon was accepted into a graduate program at the Florida Institute of Technology, but did not enroll.

== Teenage years ==
In July 1988, the parents separated, and their son was eventually placed in the custody of his mother, Cathy Gunn. His mother alleged psychological abuse from the elder De Mello, saying that he pushed their son too hard and did not permit her to use the telephone or to be present during interviews. After graduating from university, he opted to enroll in Sunnyvale Junior High School (now Sunnyvale Middle School) under the assumed name of James Gunn – James after the fictional spy, James Bond, with his mother's last name. He took all of the classes except math, and played in Little League Baseball. He found it "nice because no one knew who [he] was" and was "upset" when local papers identified him after his graduation. Being outed as a math genius led to social problems. In 1994, he graduated from Homestead High School.

== Later life ==
In a 2000 update to a 1987 60 Minutes news magazine interview, De Mello told Morley Safer that his early achievements may have been more due to endless hard work than to inherent intellectual capabilities. At that time, De Mello was training to be an estimator for a commercial painting company.

On March 15, 2001, the elder De Mello ended up in an armed standoff with Santa Cruz police and was charged of assault with a deadly weapon. The elder De Mello, who had bladder cancer, was released to the custody of his son. The father died on May 30, 2003.
