= Knetwit =

Social networking and study aid website

Knetwit, Inc.
- Company type: Private
- Website type: Social networking, Reference
- Available in: English
- Founded: Holland, Michigan (January)
- Headquarters: Chattanooga, Tennessee
- Key people: Tyler Jenks, Founder, Benjamin Wald, Founder
- Revenue: Unknown
- Employees: 17
- Website: knetwit.com
- Advertising: Banner ads
- Registration: Required
- Launched: February 2008
- Current status: Inactive (1 April 2011)

Knetwit.com was a social networking and study aid website aimed at colleges and universities. Knetwit hosted users’ intellectual property, and awarded users Koin (internal Knetwit currency) for its distribution. The site provided social networking features, such as friend lists and messaging. Through the Knetwit store, users could redeem their Koin for goods and cash. The domain, knetwit.com, expired on 24 March 2011 and has not been renewed. (As of 1 April 2011)

Knetwit was formed in 2007 by Tyler Jenks and Ben Wald. It moved its headquarters to Chattanooga, TN in 2008.

The site’s founders, Tyler Jenks and Benjamin Wald, were among 25 finalists in BusinessWeek’s 2008 America’s Best Young Entrepreneurs.

== Criticisms of Knetwit ==
Knetwit has been criticized for encouraging copyright infringement.

Knetwit has also been criticized for very long delays in processing times. The site claims 3-5 business days for money purchases to process, however the order ends up taking about 3 weeks on average to ship out.

Knetwit also switches up the formats that it will accept for Koin very often making it very hard to earn any "Koin". In the initial stages knetwit allowed powerpoints, pdfs, excel, all txt and wordpad documents, and bmp formats. This has been reduced over time to just word and text files after the powerpoint slide uploader did not work forcing members to convert the individual slides into bitmap files for more notes.

Many members of knetwit feel that the site has changed to make it harder for people to claim prizes (also due to the 500 bonus koin per every 5 notes being removed).

Other members have reported not receiving their orders after months of delay.

Knetwit is seem as encouraging students to miss class if the notes will be posted on their site.

Knetwit has recently added a "new" version of its store to the site...however the old store is still located on the site and the amount of koin is different from each store creating problems in checking out prizes.

Some notes whom members upload do not show up in their account and therefore do not receive credit for them, making it quite frustrating

== Other learning social networks ==
- GradeGuru
- Schoology
