= Kimberly J. Lee =

American plastic surgeon

Kimberly J. Lee is an American facial plastic and reconstructive surgeon in Beverly Hills, California. Lee is best known for operating on Allena Hansen, a woman mauled by a bear in Bakersfield.

== Early life and education ==
Born in Mountain View, California, Dr. Lee was raised in the Bay Area and graduated as valedictorian from Lynbrook High School in San Jose, California. She graduated from Stanford University, where she majored in biological sciences and won the prestigious Dinkelspiel Award for her "intellectual organizational and leadership skills." She then went on to graduate from Stanford University School of Medicine before moving to Los Angeles for her residency at UCLA, where she also served as chief resident in Head and Neck Surgery. Dr. Lee is a Board of Governor with the Stanford Medical Alumni Association.

== Hansen surgery ==
Allena Hansen was mauled by a bear in Bakersfield, drove herself to seek help, and was then airlifted to Ronald Reagan UCLA Hospital. Lee performed major surgical repair to Hansen's oral and facial wounds, described as the forehead hanging off to the side with a visible indentation of the bear's claw in the bone.

== Nail gun surgery ==
Lee came to national media attention again when she operated on Victor Benavidez, a construction worker who sustained a nail gun injury in which a 3.25 inch nail penetrated the roof of his mouth, his nose, penetrating the back of his eye socket, and narrowly missing the brain by less than a millimeter. Lee skillfully performed the delicate operation leaving the patient without any complications.

=== Media ===
Lee has been quoted in several sources, including People Magazine, the Los Angeles Times, and has been televised on The Doctors, CBS, ABC, NBC, Inside Edition, MSNBC, and the Bonnie Hunt Show.
