= Fremont Union High School District =

Public school district in California, US

Address
- 589 West Fremont Avenue Sunnyvale, California, 94087; United States

District information
- Type: Public
- Grades: 9–12
- Established: 1923
- Superintendent: Graham Clark
- Schools: 5
- NCES District ID: 0614430

Students and staff
- Students: 9,457 (2024-2025)
- Teachers: 418.34 (FTE)
- Staff: 461.36 (FTE)
- Student–teacher ratio: 22.61:1

Other information
- Website: www.fuhsd.org

Fremont Union High School District (abbreviated FUHSD) is a school district in Silicon Valley, California. It serves the communities of Cupertino, Sunnyvale, San Jose, Los Altos, Saratoga, and Santa Clara. It does not serve Fremont.

== History ==
Founded in 1923 as the West Side Union High School District, the district served the agricultural Fremont Township in the West Valley region, and still serves the regions covered by the former Township today. It originally had only one school (called West Side Union High School), which operated in a few rooms of the Sunnyvale Grammar School building, before relocating to the intersection of Fremont Avenue and Highway 9 (now Sunnyvale-Saratoga Road). Two years later, in 1925, the district received its present name and its only school was renamed "Fremont High School".

With the rise of suburban growth, which swallowed up the West Valley area in the 1950s and 1960s, the district established five more high schools: Sunnyvale High School (1956), Cupertino High School (1958), Homestead High School (1962), Lynbrook High School (1965), and Monta Vista High School (1969). Due to declining enrollment, Sunnyvale High School was shut down in 1981, with its campus being leased to the King's Academy.

== Schools ==
There are five high schools in FUHSD, as well as a community day school:

=== Cupertino High School ===
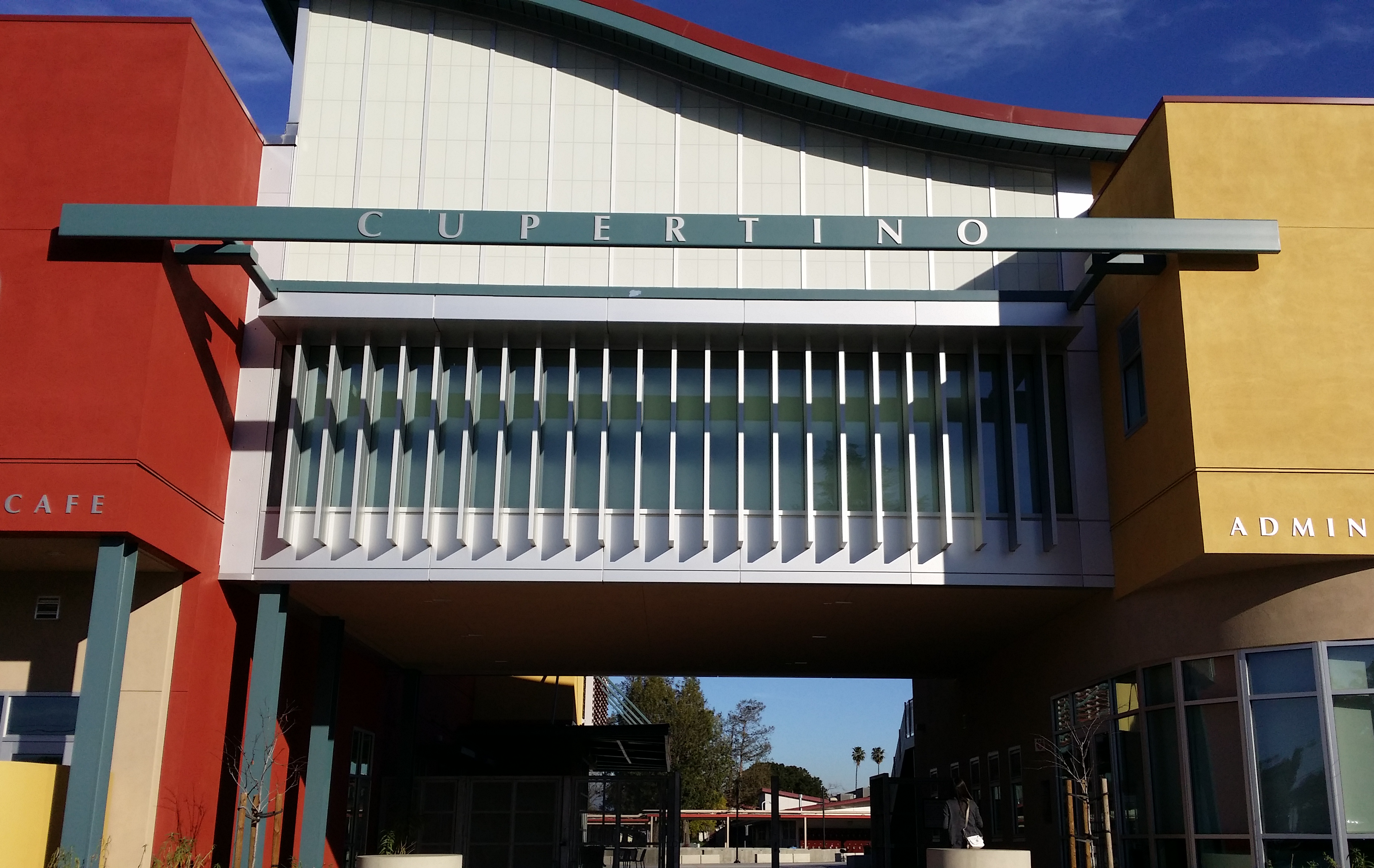
Cupertino High School

Cupertino High School, colloquially referred to as "Tino," is a public high school located near the Rancho Rinconada and Fairgrove neighborhoods of Cupertino, California. The school serves mostly suburban residential and areas in eastern Cupertino, southern Santa Clara, and western San Jose.

The 2022-23 school year had 1,997 students in attendance. The student population was 51% male and 49% female. Its racial makeup was 69% Asian, 9% White, 9% Hispanic, 7% Two or More Races, and 1% Black.

The school's land was purchased from prune farmers in 1956 for $96,000, and the school was opened on September 15, 1958. The school was honored as a California Distinguished School in 1990, 1994 and 2007, and as a Blue Ribbon School in 1994–96.

=== Fremont High School ===
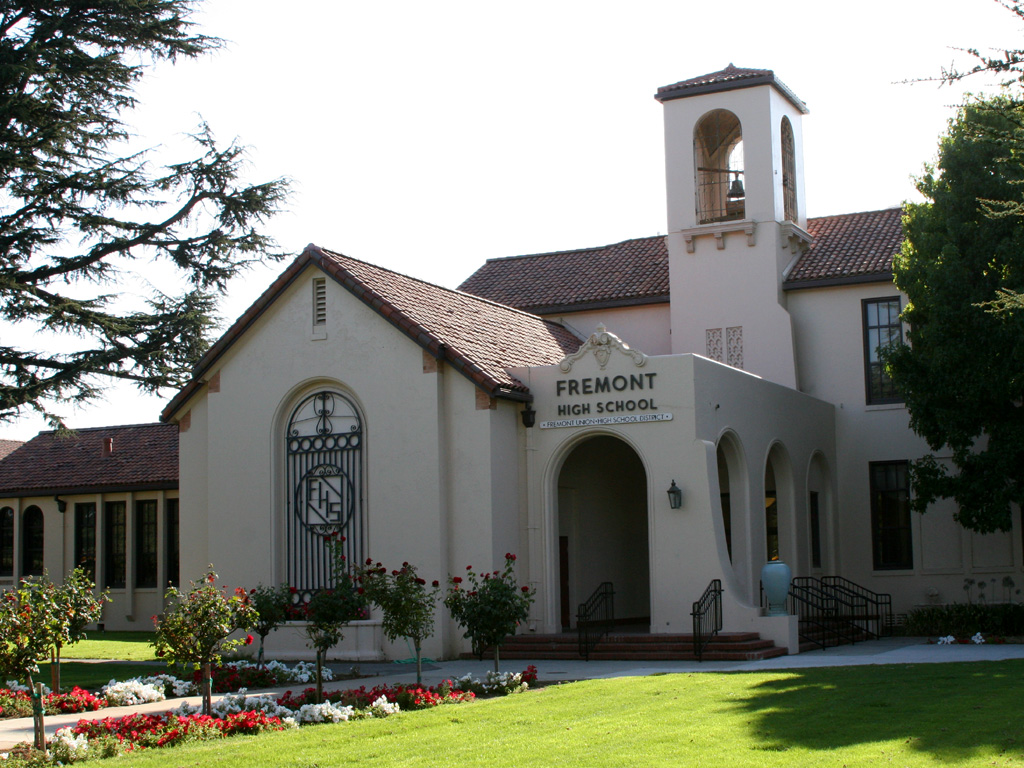
Fremont High School

Fremont High School is a public high school in Sunnyvale, California. Fremont is currently the only open public high school located in the city of Sunnyvale, and is the oldest school in the district.

The 2022-23 school year had 2,171 students in attendance. The student population was 52% male and 48% female. Its racial makeup was 43% Hispanic, 23% Asian, 16% White, 6% Two or More Races, 1% Black and 1% Native Hawaiian/Pacific Islander.

The school was founded in 1923. The mascot used to be the Indian, but it was changed to the firebird in 1996. The school was honored as a California Distinguished School in 1996.

=== Homestead High School ===
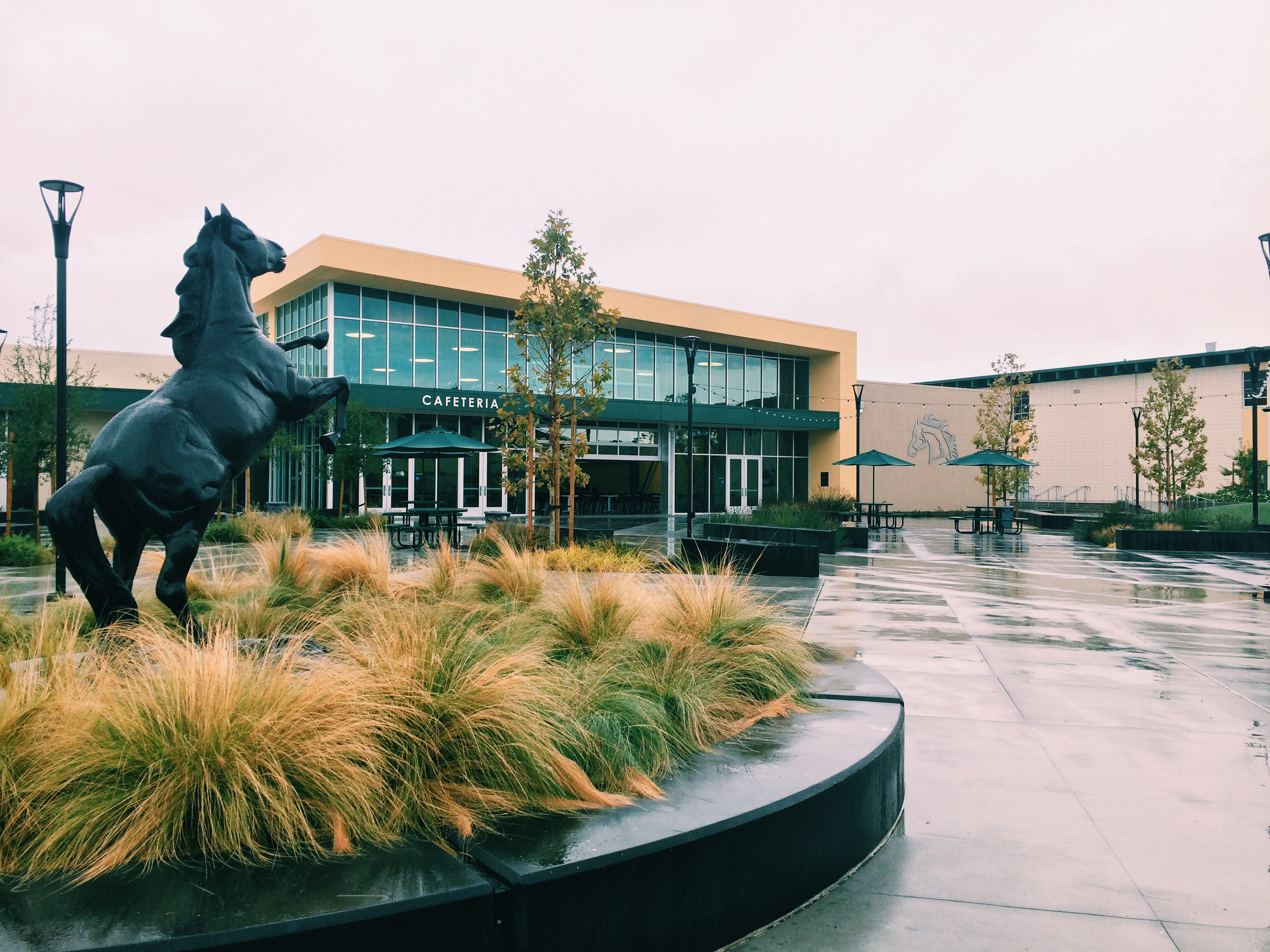
Homestead High School

Homestead High School is a public high school serving western Sunnyvale, southern Los Altos, and northwestern Cupertino, in Santa Clara County, California.

The 2022-23 school year had 2,311 students in attendance. The student population was 51% male and 49% female. Its racial makeup was 41% Asian, 23% White, 20% Hispanic, 9% Two or More Races and 1% Black.

The school was established in 1962. In 2003 and 2009, the California Department of Education recognized Homestead as a California Distinguished School, and in 2004, the Department of Education recognized Homestead as a Blue Ribbon School.

=== Lynbrook High School ===
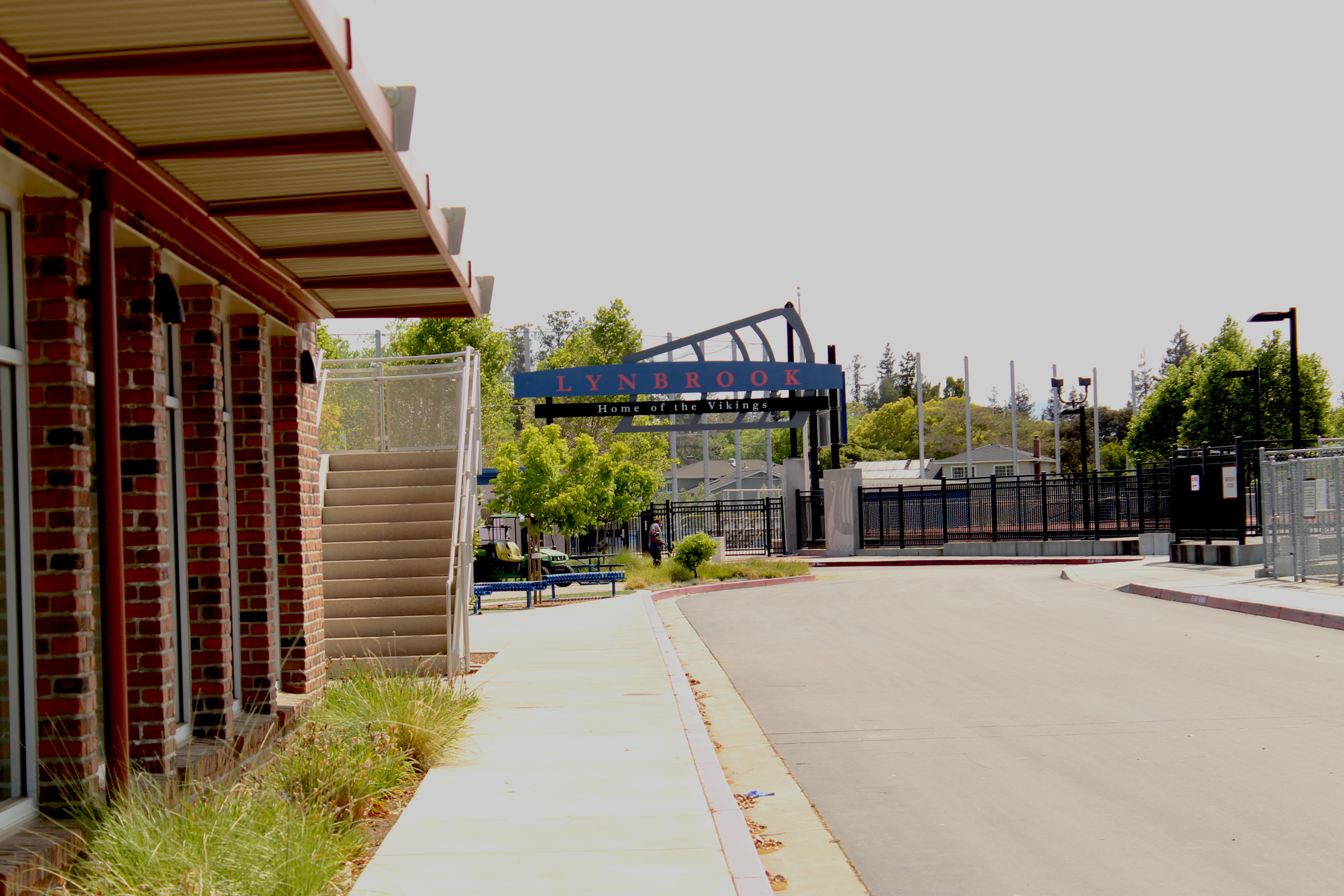
Lynbrook High School

Lynbrook High School is a public high school located in the West San Jose neighborhood of San Jose, California. It was founded in 1965. The class of 1968 was the first to graduate.

The 2022-23 school year had 1,741 students in attendance. The student population was 53% male and 47% female. Its racial makeup was 84% Asian, 7% White, 5% Two or More Races and 4% Hispanic.

The school was honored as a California Distinguished School in 1990, 1994, 1999 and 2007, and as a Blue Ribbon School in 2008 and 2024.

=== Monta Vista High School ===
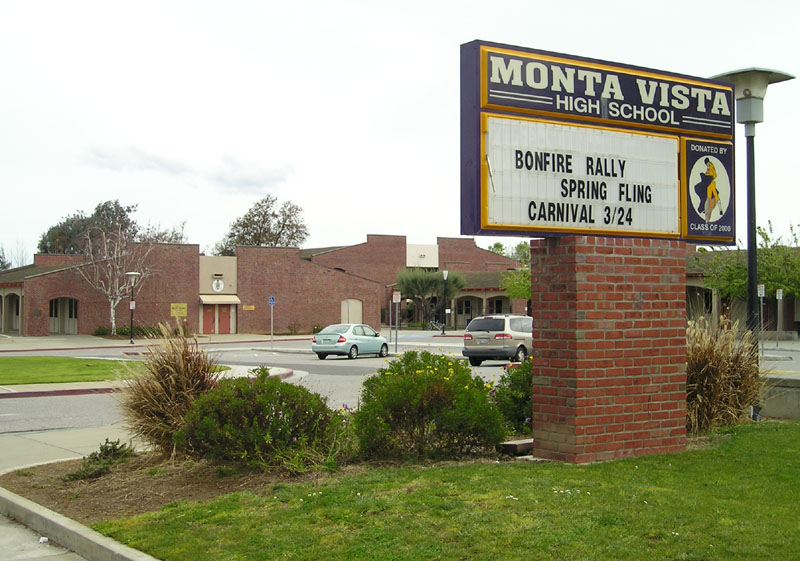
Monta Vista High School

Monta Vista High School is a public high school in Cupertino, California. It was founded in 1969.

The 2022-23 school year had 1,751 students in attendance. The student population was 49% male and 51% female. Its racial makeup was 77% Asian, 8% White, 6% Two or More Races and 4% Hispanic.

The school was honored as a California Distinguished School in 1988, 1990, 1996, 2003 and 2007, and as a Blue Ribbon School in 1997–98, 2008 and 2014.

== Student enrollment ==
During the 2013-14 school year, there were 10,667 students in Fremont Union High School District. In terms of race and ethnicity, the district is predominantly Asian American. European American students make up a large minority. Hispanic and Latino students are also a sizable minority. In contrast, African American students are not very numerous. During the 2007 school year, Asian American students made up 53.3% of the school district's student population. European American students made up 32.7% of the student population; Hispanics and Latinos made up 11.7% of the population. African American and American Indian students made up 2.0% and 0.4% of the population respectively.

Because the school district has recently faced a substantial budget deficit, it is now only enrolling residents who live within the district's boundaries. In the past, many students who did not live within the district were allowed to attend Fremont Union High School District's schools, but now the district is closely investigating all student residences. These investigations sometimes involve going into a student's alleged home, where a specially-trained district employee searches the home—including the student's bedroom—for signs that the student actually lives in the home. Video of two such inspections aired in a 2006 segment of the ABC News program 20/20. The narrator, John Stossel, was showing how the reputation of the district's schools motivates parents to falsify the residential information of their students. As explained on the 20/20 program, if the student is found to be from an outside area, they may be expelled from school.

== CAHSEE performance ==
The California High School Exit Exam (CAHSEE) is administered to every sophomore enrolled . Students must pass the test in order to receive a high school diploma. According to the California Department of Education in 2008, 93% of sophomores enrolled in the Fremont Union High School District passed the English-Language Arts portion of the test . According to the California Department of Education in 2008, 95% of sophomores enrolled in FUHSD passed the mathematics portion of the test.

== Technology ==
The Fremont Union High School District runs a technological system, including its own website servers, IP addresses, VoIP Infrastructure, and library catalog. Schoology is the school district's primary means of communicating to students via the Internet.
