= 3PAC =

American rapper and YouTuber (1991–2015)

- Harryman in 2015

Background information
- Born: Ryan James Harryman; February 6, 1991; Santa Clara County, California, US
- Origin: Sunnyvale, California, US
- Died: October 17, 2015 (aged 24) San Jose, California, U.S.
- Genre: Comedy hip-hop
- Occupation: Rapper
- Years active: 2012–2015
- Website: zerohoots.com

Ryan James Harryman (February 6, 1991 – October 17, 2015), better known by his alias 3PAC, was an American comedy hip-hop rapper and YouTuber.

== Early life ==
Harryman was born in Santa Clara County, California, he grew up in Mountain View, California with an older brother named William and a younger sister named Julia. Harryman attended and graduated from Homestead High School (California) in Cupertino, California.

Harryman initially enrolled in community college and worked as a lifeguard at a local pool. Harryman then transferred to and attended San Jose State University (SJSU) majoring in Anthropology, and played on the university's water polo club. Harryman was set to graduate from the university in the Spring 2016 semester. Harryman's water polo club teammates described him as one that "brought a constant positive attitude and made [teammates] smile at every opportunity" and "one of the most dedicated members of [the] team".

== Rapping career ==
The etymology behind the "3PAC" alias was Harryman's claim of being an "even greater rapper than [Tupac Shakur]" because "2PAC never used the word 'swag' in a rap song".

The slang word "hoot", one of the most common tropes of Harryman's music, refers to "topics and individuals worthy of [mockery and ridicule]". Derided individuals were referred to as "hoot givers" because they were "the [complete] opposite of 3PAC": the one that doesn't give "zero hoots".

Harryman's fandom is referred to as the "Zero Hoots Gang (ZHG)".

On July 2, 2013, Harryman released a music video for his diss track called "Rap God", one of his songs on his first mixtape titled "3PACALYPSE NOW". The song was a direct response to Eminem's single Rap God with a caption saying "hardest rapper in the game son...eminem not the real rap god son". Two months later, 3PAC released a music video called "I DON'T GIVE A HOOT" where he "meanders through an abandoned mall with toilet paper wrapped around his head and an oversized gold chain slung around his neck, dancing on top of food-court tables and rapping while squeezed into a stationary, coin-operated police car that he’s much too large to fit into. His words are mumbled and slurred as he mimics a deep Alabama redneck accent."

In late 2014, Harryman performed at a house party in San Luis Obispo, California with fifty total people in attendance.

== Death ==
On October 13, 2015, Harryman practiced at SJSU's aquatic center. Harryman's water polo club teammates then noticed that he submerged under water for at least one minute, laid unconscious, and was not able to breathe. Lifeguards pulled Harryman out of the pool and performed CPR. Harryman was then transported to San Jose Regional Medical Center where it was recorded that he suffered "severe brain damage". Harryman was then taken off life support and was pronounced dead on October 17, 2015. A few days later, the Santa Clara County Coroner determined, in an autopsy, that "fresh water drowning" was the cause of death On October 23, 2015, SJSU and the Harryman family organized a candlelight vigil around the Victory Salute statue. The vigil attracted more than 100 people (mostly friends and family).

== Discography ==
=== Mixtapes ===
Title	Tracklist	Details
3PACALYPSE NOW	1. BEAT DA CHEEKS; 2. 3PAC STYLE; 3. RICH WHITE MAN MARK CUBAN; 4. SWAG LIKE OSAMA; 5. CHEDDA; 6. DAMN IT FEELS GOOD TO BE 3PAC; 7. GOLDEN CHILD; 8. I DONT GIVE A HOOT; 9. I LOVE MCCHICKENS; 10. IM SWAGGIN; 11. JULIUS CAESAR; 12. MY FAVORITE DOG; 13. NUGGETS ON DECK; 14. 2 CHAINZ SUCKS DICK; 15. PEWDIEPIE IS A CHILD RAPIST; 16. RAP GOD; 17. SO CUTE FT. JUSTIN BIEBER; 18. SQUAT HOOT; 19. SWAGGIN LIKE ROMNEY; 20. WHITE NIGGA; 21. WINNIN; 22. NEVER BEEN A HO; 23. HATE IT OR LOVE IT (THE WHITE NIGGA ON TOP); 24. SON; 25. THAT ZHG; 26. EBOLA IS HOOT	Released: September 15, 2014; Format: Digital download
ZHG TILL INFINITY	1. Trap God; 2. Hollywood, What's Good Son?; 3. Rich White Man Chevy Chase; 4. Cali Good; 5. Fly With Me; 6. Soarin' (In My Foreign); 7. SF Flows; 8. Let It Flow; 9. For the ZHG; 10. Hustlin'; 11. Bacon ZHG Freestyle; 12. Cannibis Cup (ft. Bing Flosby); 13. No Trout; 14. Real Nigga	Released: February 6, 2015; Format: Digital download
3PAC Of The Caribbean	1. CHOICE (YUP) #ZHG; 2. Trouts; 3. DONT GIVE A HOOT BOUT SHIT; 4. Black Hoe; 5. Just A Kid; 6. Just Chill; 7. Keep on Reppin That ZHG; 8. Till I Die; 9. Bay Son; 10. We Can Change the World Son; 11. Blazin; 12. Chedda Mama; 13. Ain't Stoppin **BEAST MODE ACTIVATED**; 14. Cancer Is Hoot; 15. GALÁPAGOS ISLANDS **BEAST MODE ACTIVATED**; 16. Pool Party; 17. PUT ON WITH ALL MY HUSTLIN'; 18. Spider-Man Is Hoot; 19. Ballin' Like Curry; 20. Time To Find Another Way; 21. PayPal Me A Dollar	Released: August 16, 2015; Format: Digital download
Insomniac Flows	1. She Don't Want A Trout; 2. Bad Bitches; 3. For My Homies; 4. Fuck A 9 To 5; 5. Top Of The World; 6. Trouts Talking Smack; 7. Gets Chedda; 8. Ambidextrous Flow	Released: September 9, 2015; Format: Digital download

=== As featured artist ===
- I Need My Friends by Cal Chuchesta (August 24, 2015)
