= Saratoga High School (California) =

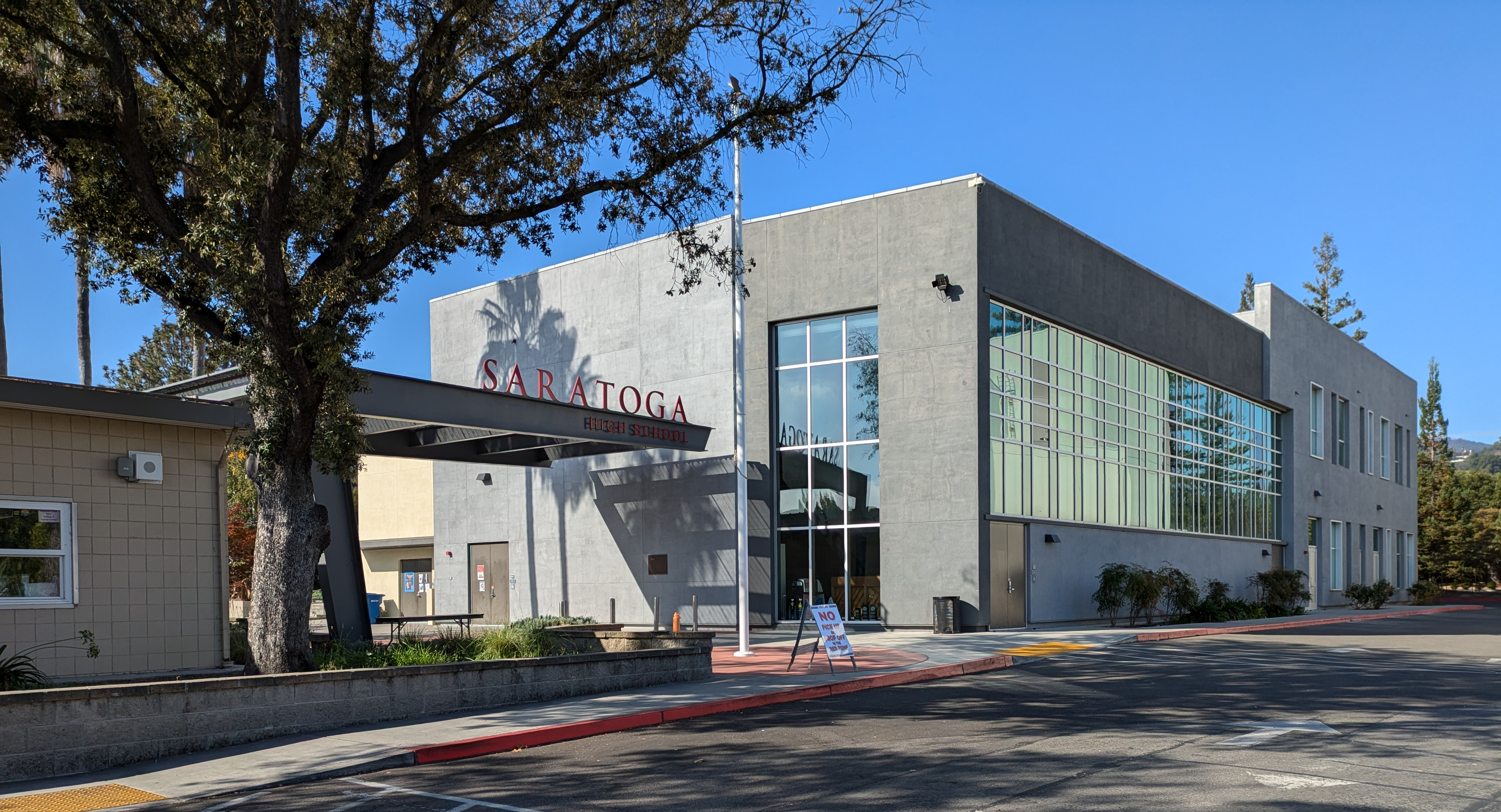

Location
- 20300 Herriman Avenue; Saratoga, California 95070; United States
- 37°15′58″N 122°1′44″W

Information
- Type: Public high school
- Established: 1959
- School district: Los Gatos-Saratoga Joint Union High School District
- Superintendent: Heath Rocha
- Principal: Greg Louie
- Teaching staff: 60.85 (on an FTE basis)
- Grades: 9–12
- Enrollment: 1,161 (2024–2025)
- Student to teacher ratio: 19.08
- Colors: Scarlet, navy blue, and grey
- Athletics conference: Santa Clara Valley Athletic League
- Nickname: The Nest
- Teams: Football, Basketball(M&W), Water Polo(M&W), History Bowl
- Team name: Falcons
- Accreditation: WASC
- Newspaper: http://www.saratogafalcon.org/
- Yearbook: The Talisman
- Communities served: Saratoga, Monte Sereno, Los Gatos
- Feeder schools: Redwood Middle School
- Website: http://www.saratogahigh.org/

Saratoga High School is a grade 9–12, public high school located in Saratoga, California. In 2021 it was ranked No. 1 Best College Prep Public High School in California according to Niche.

== Academics ==
Saratoga High School is consistently designated a top academic high school. It is one of two schools in the Los Gatos-Saratoga Joint Union High School District, which is ranked the Best School District in California.

Saratoga High School has a four-year Project Lead the Way engineering program, and is ranked No. 23 in the U.S. for science, technology, engineering, and mathematics (STEM). The school offers 35 honors and Advanced Placement courses. The school's Media Arts Program (MAP), which began with its first class in 2008–2009, has produced several media professionals, and is a school-within-a-school program averaging 300 students each year. MAP loops English, History, and Media Arts courses from grades 10–12.

The graduation rate is 99%, and 97% of students attend college. It is jointly accredited by the California Department of Education and the Western Association of Schools and Colleges.

Student enrollment averages around 1200, with a student-teacher ratio of approximately 20:1. It is a diverse high school, with total minority enrollment of 75%. The school community includes families that speak 39 languages.

In 2017, Saratoga High School was named a California Gold Ribbon School for the strength of its Student Support Programs and its focus on Social Emotional Learning.

== Activities ==
=== Athletics ===
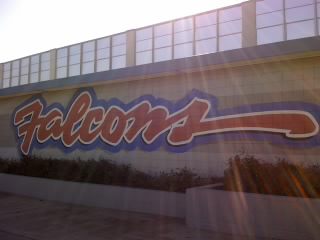
Saratoga Falcons

The Saratoga Falcons compete in the Santa Clara Valley Athletic League (SCVAL) of the CIF Central Coast Section (CCS).

More than 60% of students participate in Saratoga High School athletics. From 2015 to 2020, every varsity team competed in the CCS playoffs; titles and runners up were earned in Boys and Girls Tennis, Boys and Girls Basketball, Boys Cross Country, Boys Volleyball, and Badminton. In addition, individual medals were won in Wrestling and Boys and Girls Track and Field. In 2019, the Boys Golf Team finished No. 4 in California. Boys Volleyball won two Northern California championships in 2016 and 2017.

Saratoga Football has won five CIF Central Coast Section championships: 1973, 1976, 1980, 1987, 1996. The team formerly played night games at Los Gatos High School; in April 2006, the Trustees of the Los Gatos-Saratoga Joint Union High School District approved permanent lights for the football field.

SHS Baseball won a Division II CCS championship in 1999.

In 2009, the girls' varsity tennis team defeated rival Monta Vista High School 5-2 for their first CCS championship in the history of the program and went on to win the title again in 2010.

=== Theater arts and music ===
Performing Arts is a strong area of achievement at Saratoga High School. Almost 40% of students perform onstage through theater arts, vocal ensembles and instrumental music. The Saratoga Strings orchestra performed in the prestigious Midwest Clinic International Band and Orchestra Conference in Chicago, Illinois in 2018 and 2023. The Marching Band and Color Guard marched in the 2016 Tournament of Roses Parade in Pasadena, California. The Marching Band participated in the 2012 Macy's Parade in New York City. In 2024, the Winter Percussion team attended the WGI World Championships at the University of Dayton Arena, making the finals round. The Winter Percussion World Class group went back to attend the WGI World Championships at the University of Dayton Arena in 2026 with their production "Those Who Tell Stories", and made it to finals, where they reached 8th place out of 15 groups with a score of 92.525.

In addition to national performances and competitions, the Saratoga High School Music Department traveled with their Symphonic Wind Ensemble, Saratoga Symphony Orchestra, and choir to Japan in the summer of 2026 for a cultural exchange.

=== Robotics teams ===
The FRC and VEX robotics teams at the high school consistently advance to the FIRST and VEX World Championships. The FRC robotics team has consistently qualified to the World Championship almost every year. The VEX robotics team won the 2024 National Championship and were 2025 World Semifinalists and Division Champions.

=== Chess team ===
At the 2005 National Grade Level Chess Championships in Houston, the 9th graders were national champions. The team won the NorCal State Championship for a record six consecutive years (2004–2010).

=== Science Bowl team ===
The Science Bowl team qualified for the 2023 National Science Bowl competition in Washington DC.

== Campus ==
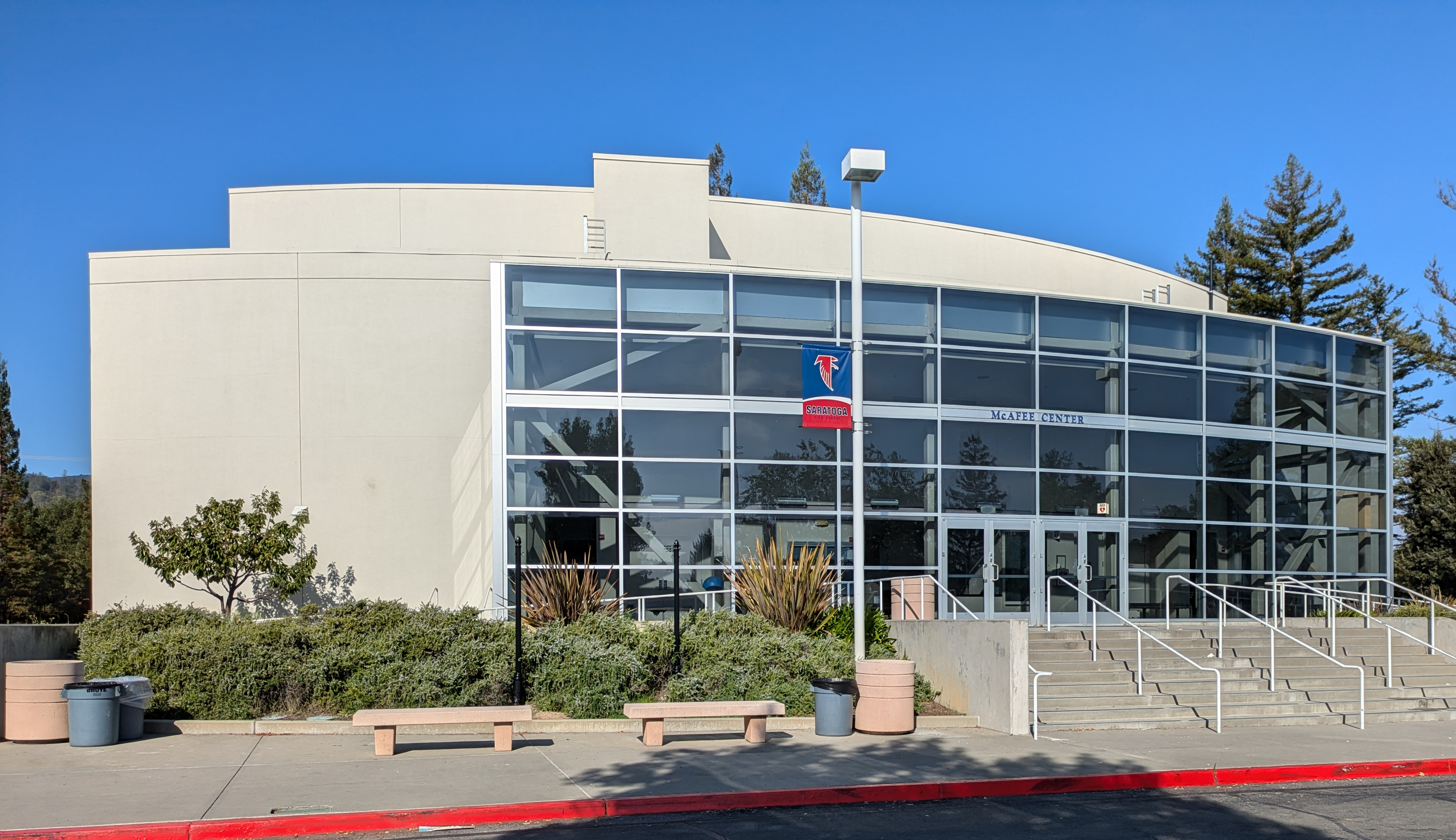
McAfee Performing Arts and Lecture Center

The school has 8 tennis courts, an all weather track, an artificial turf football field, an artificial turf soccer field, an artificial turf softball field, a quad, and an Olympic-size swimming pool. The McAfee Performing Arts and Lecture Center, a community facility, opened in 2006.

== Notable alumni ==
- Mark Ames (1983) – journalist
- Andrew Bosworth (2000) – CTO of Meta Platforms
- Zach Gill (1993) – musician
- Lance Guest (1978) – actor
- Lee Hancock (1985) – MLB player
- Bill Haselman (1984) – MLB player and coach
- Andrew Hong (2023) – Chess grandmaster
- Dan Janjigian (1991) – actor and bobsledder
- Alex Lagemann (2007) – musician
- Beth Lisick (1987) – author
- Patricia Miranda (1997) – bronze medalist in wrestling at 2004 Summer Olympics
- Richa Moorjani
- Cyndy Poor (1971) – 1976 Olympian and American record holder
- Anil Raj (2002) – human rights activist, Amnesty International board member, killed in Kabul while working on United Nations Development Programme.
- Kyle Shanahan (1993) – head coach of NFL's San Francisco 49ers
- Varun Sivaram (2007) – Rhodes Scholar, CTO of ReNew Power, and author
- Ed Solomon (1978) – actor, director, writer and producer
- Steven Spielberg (1965) – Academy Award-winning film director
- Carrie Steinseifer (1986) – 1984 Olympic swimmer
- Mark Suciu (2010) – professional skateboarder
- Vienna Teng (1996) – singer-songwriter
- David Warshofsky (1979) – actor
- Sasha Pickard (2019) - Professional Soccer Player

== See also ==
- Suicide of Audrie Pott
