= Katarina Comesaña =

Peruvian footballer (born 1992)

Personal information
- Full name: Katarina Gabriela Comesaña Plevančić
- Date of birth: 19 June 1992 (age 34)
- Place of birth: Sunnyvale, California, U.S.
- Height: 1.78 m (5 ft 10 in)
- Positions: Centre back; centre forward

Youth career
- Homestead HS

College career
Years	Team	Apps	(Gls)
2011–2012	De Anza Dons		
2013–2014	Idaho Vandals	19	(0)

Senior career*
Years	Team	Apps	(Gls)
2018	El Agustino		
2018	MVLA Wolves	1	(0)

International career^{‡}
2018–	Peru	2	(0)
- * Club domestic league appearances and goals as of 29 June 2018 ‡ National team caps and goals as of 12 April 2018

Katarina Gabriela Comesaña Plevančić (born 19 June 1992) is a footballer who plays as a centre back. Born in the United States, she represents Peru at international level.

Her father is Peruvian and her mother is Croatian.

== International career ==
Comesaña made her senior debut for Peru in 2018.
