= Doug Ferrari =

American stand-up comedian and comedy writer

- Born: December 25, 1956 (age 69); San Francisco, California, U.S.
- Other name: Dougzilla
- Education: Cupertino High School
- Occupations: Stand-up comedian; comedy writer

Doug Ferrari (born December 25, 1956) is an American stand-up comedian and comedy writer based in the San Francisco Bay Area. He is often called Dougzilla due to his large stature.

== Early life ==
Ferrari was born in San Francisco on Christmas Day of 1956. He graduated from Cupertino High School at the age of sixteen and was offered a scholarship to Stanford University, which he turned down to pursue a career in comedy.

== Career ==
Ferrari performed his first stand-up gig at The Comedy Store. Shortly thereafter, in 1975, he co-founded a musical comedy group called the High Wire Radio Choir. They released an album entitled Teenage Mutant Love in 1979 before disbanding in the early eighties.

Ferrari won the San Francisco Comedy Competition in 1984. In the years following, he was performing up to 500 shows a year and sharing the stage with comedians such as Jerry Seinfeld, Drew Carey, Robin Williams and Bob Hope, and musical acts including John Lee Hooker, Ray Charles, Elvis Costello, Warren Zevon and Sun Ra. At this same time he appeared in television programs and videos including Paramount Comedy Theatre, Vol. 2: Decent Exposures, VH1's Stand-Up Spotlight, MTV's ½ Hour Comedy Hour and guest starred in A Fine Romance.

Ferrari's career ended in the mid-1990s because of his struggles with mental illness and addiction. After a period of homelessness he received treatment and returned to comedy in 2000. Ferrari has performed benefits for homeless people since his return to comedy. He appeared in #BeRobin the Movie, a 2015 documentary about Margaret Cho's homeless outreach campaign inspired by Robin Williams.

He has also written material for other comedians, including Jay Leno, Rodney Dangerfield and Will Durst.

== Personal life ==
Ferrari married his wife Beth in the 90s. They were separated for a time at the end of the decade, but reconciled in the early 2000s. They split up, and he currently has a new girlfriend named Debbie. Beth booked his performances and ran a website for people with borderline personality disorder; Doug Ferrari has been diagnosed with borderline personality disorder as well as generalized anxiety disorder. His struggles with these disorders contributed to his homelessness and difficulties in his career and marriage. Doug now resides in the Mill Valley area.
