= Santa Clara Valley Athletic League =

High school athletic conference in California

Santa Clara Valley Athletic League (SCVAL) is a high school athletic conference and part of the CIF Central Coast Section of the California Interscholastic Federation. Its 14+ member schools are in the northern part of the Santa Clara Valley. Each sport is divided into two leagues based on strength. The De Anza League is for stronger teams and El Camino League is for weaker teams.

== History ==
The SCVAL was established in 1973 and had 13 founding members: Awalt, Buchser, Cupertino, Fremont, Homestead, Los Altos, Lynbrook, Monta Vista, Mountain View, Peterson (closed 1981), Santa Clara, Sunnyvale, Wilcox. In 1974 the league decided to split into the two divisions based on strength. In 1976, Saratoga transferred from the West Valley Athletic League (WVAL) to the DAL. In 1981 Sunnyvale High School closed and St. Francis joined the Girls Division. Around 1982, Mt. View High School closed its Castro Street and the name transferred to the Awalt High School building. The same year, Santa Clara closed the downtown location which became Buchser Middle School, and the Santa Clara High School name transferred to the Buchser High School location. In 1981, Peterson was converted into a Middle School. In 1988 Los Gatos joined the DAL, also leaving the WVAL. In 2002 St Francis left the DAL to join the West Catholic Athletic League (WCAL).

== Football Members ==
Football divisions for 2021

=== De Anza League ===
- Palo Alto High School
- Mountain View High School
- Milpitas High School
- Homestead High School
- Santa Clara High School
- Wilcox High School
- Los Gatos High School

=== El Camino League ===
- Saratoga High School
- Gunn High School
- Monta Vista High School
- Lynbrook High School
- Fremont High School
- Los Altos High School
- Cupertino High School

== Basketball Members ==
Basketball divisions for 2021

=== De Anza League ===
- Palo Alto High School
- Cupertino High School
- Milpitas High School
- Santa Clara High School
- Homestead High School
- Los Altos High School
- Mountain View High School

=== El Camino League ===
- Fremont High School
- Gunn High School
- Los Gatos High School
- Lynbrook High School
- Monta Vista High School
- Saratoga High School
- Wilcox High School

== Lacrosse Members ==
Lacrosse divisions for 2022

=== De Anza League ===
- Carlmont High School
- Los Gatos High School
- Menlo-Atherton High School
- Sequoia High School
- Palo Alto High School
- Burlingame High School

=== El Camino League ===
- Hillsdale High School
- Woodside High School
- Saratoga High School
- Aragon High School
- Leland High School
- Pioneer High School
- Gunn High School
- Los Altos High School
- Mountain View High School

== Wrestling Members ==
Wrestling divisions for 2021

=== De Anza League ===
- Palo Alto High School
- Cupertino High School
- Fremont High School
- Los Gatos High School
- Wilcox High School
- Lynbrook High School
- Homestead High School

=== El Camino League ===
- Los Altos High School
- Gunn High School
- Mountain View High School
- Santa Clara High School
- Saratoga High School
- Milpitas High School
- Monta Vista High School

== Track & Field Members ==
Track & Field divisions for 2021

=== De Anza League ===
- Palo Alto High School
- Gunn High School
- Homestead High School
- Los Altos High School
- Los Gatos High School
- Lynbrook High School
- Milpitas High School

=== El Camino League ===
- Cupertino High School
- Fremont High School
- Monta Vista High School
- Mountain View High School
- Santa Clara High School
- Saratoga High School
- Wilcox High School
