= Mohammad Gorjestani =

- Born: February 8, 1984 (age 42); Tehran, Iran
- Occupations: Director, Writer, Producer and cinematographer
- Years active: 2007–present

Mohammad Gorjestani (born February 8, 1984) is an Iranian-American writer, director, and producer. He is best known for Exit 12, Sister Hearts and Refuge.

== Life and career ==
Gorjestani was born in Tehran, Iran. His family fled to the United States in 1988 due to the Iran/Iraq War. He attended Cupertino High School and later attended the Vancouver Film School. His thesis film, The Shade, premiered at the Tribeca Film Festival in 2007 and was later acquired by the BBC.

Gorjestani received film grants from ITVS, for his near future short film Refuge, starring Nikohl Boosheri, and screened at the Tribeca Film Festival and SXSW Film Festival. He was named one of Filmmaker Magazine's 25 New Faces of Independent Film. His most recent short film, Exit 12, was acquired by Fox Searchlight Pictures.

Gorjestani has earned 9 Vimeo Staff Picks for his works. He created “The Happy Birthday Project”, a series of short films on Police killings in America. He is also a 2x recipient of the San Francisco Film Society's Kenneth Rainin Foundation (KRF) Filmmaking Grant for his feature film, currently in development. He is co-founder of Even/Odd.

== Filmography ==
- The Shade (Sayeh) (2007) (Also writer)
- Refuge (2013) (Also writer)
- Happy Birthday Oscar Grant (2015)
- MissMe: The Artful Vandal (2016)
- Happy Birthday Philando Castile (2016)
- Happy Birthday Mario Woods (2016)
- The Boombox Collection: Boots Riley (2016)
- The Boombox Collection: Zion I (2016)
- Yassin Falafel (2017)
- Made in Iowa (2017)
- Lakota in America (2017)
- Sister Hearts (2018)
- Exit 12 (2019) (Also writer)

== Awards and nominations ==
Year	Result	Award	Category	Work
2018	Won	Tribeca Film Festival	Tribeca X Award	Sister Hearts
2019	Won	Minneapolis Saint Paul International Film Festival	Audience Choice Award	Exit 12
2019	Won	SXSW Film Festival	Grand Jury Award	Exit 12
2019	Won	Camden International Film Festival	Best Short Film	Exit 12
