= Sunnyvale School District (California) =

School district in California, United States

Address
- 819 West Iowa Avenue Sunnyvale, California, 94088; United States

District information
- Type: Public
- Grades: K–8
- NCES District ID: 0638460

Students and staff
- Students: 5,950
- Teachers: 289.42 (FTE)
- Staff: 345.59
- Student–teacher ratio: 20.56

Other information
- Website: www.sesd.org

The Sunnyvale Elementary School District is a public school district located in Sunnyvale, California.

The Sunnyvale Elementary School District is a feeder for the Fremont Union High School District and it is made up of ten schools, eight of which are elementary schools, and two which are middle schools. Bishop, Cherry Chase, Cumberland, Ellis, Fairwood, Lakewood, San Miguel, and Vargas are the eight elementary schools. Columbia and Sunnyvale Middle School are the middle schools.

== Transportation ==
Sunnyvale School District's bus fleet consists of the following:

- 8 2014-2021 Blue Bird All American T3 RE (6 electric, 2 CNG)

=== Historical fleet ===
- Crown Supercoach
- 2002-2003 Blue Bird All American RE CNG
