= Fremont High School (Sunnyvale, California) =

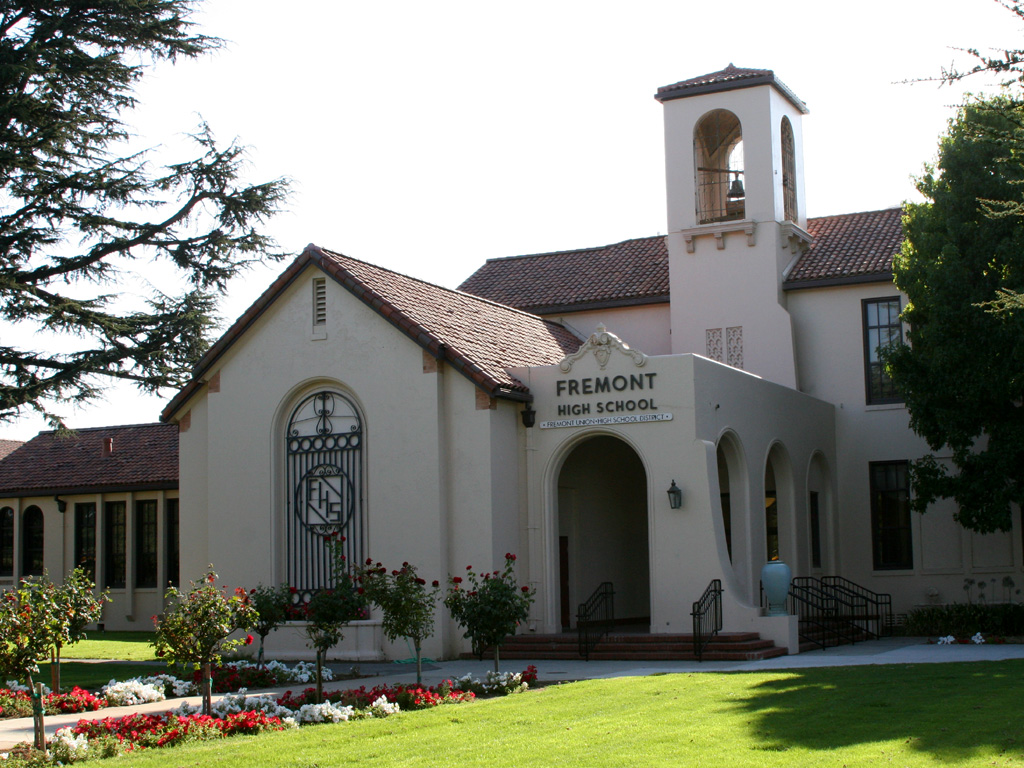

Location
- 575 W Fremont Ave; Sunnyvale, California 94087; United States; 37°21′11″N 122°02′01″W

Information
- Type: Public 4-year
- Established: 1923
- School district: Fremont Union High School District
- Principal: Bryan Emmert
- Enrollment: 2,169 (2023-2024)
- Color: Cardinal White Black
- Athletics conference: Santa Clara Valley Athletic League; CIF Central Coast Section
- Team name: Firebirds
- Rival: Homestead High School
- Yearbook: Pathfinder
- Nobel laureates: Andrew Fire
- Newspaper: The Phoenix
- Website: fhs.fuhsd.org

Fremont High School is a 4-year public high school in Sunnyvale, California, United States. Fremont is currently the only open public high school located in the city of Sunnyvale and is part of the Fremont Union High School District (FUHSD).

== History ==
Fremont High School was originally named West Side Union High School, the first school opened in the West Side Union High School District. In 1923, it opened in rooms of the Sunnyvale Grammar School as the only high school in the Sunnyvale–Cupertino (West Valley) area, and then moved to a temporary building after purchase of the school site in 1923. The school building was designed in 1925 by noted California school architect W. H. Weeks, after the necessary bond referendum passed on the third attempt. On March 27, 1925, the board of trustees unanimously voted to change the name of the school and district to Fremont Union High School.

In 1942, during the Second World War, Fremont became a temporary recruitment training ground and around half of the class of 1942 joined the military.

In 1969, a late-night fire occurred in the bell tower of the main building; the 1970 freshman class went to Monta Vista High School in Cupertino while rebuilding was done.

On July 1, 1996, after much controversy, the Fremont Union School Board did away with the original Indian mascot, replacing it with the current Firebirds mascot.

Famous YouTuber and former NASA engineer Mark Rober uploaded a video about the true scale of the Solar System in 2016, with scaled objects laid on starting on Fremont's field and going beyond.

== Campus ==
Fremont High School is located at the intersection of Fremont Avenue and Sunnyvale–Saratoga Road. The Fremont Union High School District's offices are also located on the school campus.

The original buildings are built in a Mission Revival architectural style, designed by W. H. Weeks in 1925. Three classroom buildings that were added in the 1950s on the Fremont Avenue side were demolished and replaced with new instructional and administrative space also in mission style, creating a quadrangle.

== Demographics ==
In the 2014–2015 school year, Fremont had a total enrollment of 1,964 students. Asian students comprised 20.8% of the school's student population while Filipino & Pacific Islander students made up 12.1%. Black students made up 3.1% of the population. Hispanic students were the largest group, representing 44% of the student population with White students the second largest at 26.9% of the student population. Also, there were a small number of American Indian & Alaska Native students, around 0.1% of the student population.

Additionally, 21.1% of the students are English language learners and 42.3% are socio-economically disadvantaged.

In the 2024–2025 school year, Fremont had a total enrollment of 2,060 students. Hispanic students were the largest group, representing 43.6% of the student population, followed by Asian students at 31.1% and White students at 15.8%. Black students made up 1.3% of the population, and American Indian & Alaska Native students made up 0.7%. Federal data counts Filipino students as Asian; earlier state figures reported them separately.

Additionally, 19.7% of the students are English language learners and 30.8% are socio-economically disadvantaged.

== Athletics ==
Fremont competes in the Santa Clara Valley Athletic League (SCVAL) of the CIF Central Coast Section (CCS).

Fremont won the team title at the first CCS wrestling championship held after the section separated from the North Coast Section. At the 2006 CIF State Championships, Fremont placed third in the team standings and had three individual state champions: Boris Novachkov (103 lbs), Filip Novachkov (119 lbs), and Greg Crane (160 lbs). Borislav Novachkov won a second state title in 2007 and later competed in freestyle wrestling at the 2016 Summer Olympics.

In 2003–2004, the varsity cheerleading team won two United Spirit Association national championships in Anaheim, in Small Coed Show Cheer and Coed Partner Stunt.

== Notable alumni ==
Notable alumni of Fremont High School include:

- Tully Banta-Cain — New England Patriots football player, 2003–10
- Carl Ekern — Los Angeles Rams football player 1976–1988
- Andrew Fire — professor at Stanford University and 2006 Nobel Prize co-winner in Medicine or Physiology
- Bill Green, former U.S. and NCAA record holder in Track and Field, 5th place in the hammer throw at the 1984 Olympic Games
- Donna Hanover — newscaster, actress, ex-wife of Rudy Giuliani
- Teri Hatcher — Golden Globe-winning actress
- Garry Jestadt — MLB San Diego Padres infielder
- Imran Khan — Bollywood actor
- Steve Kloves — Oscar-nominated screenwriter
- Francie Larrieu-Smith — Olympic distance runner, five-time Olympian, member of National Track and Field Hall of Fame
- Brian MacLeod — recording artist and songwriter
- Irene Miracle — Golden Globe-winning actress
- Borislav Novachkov — two-time CIF wrestling state champion, NCAA wrestling Division I runner-up, 2016 wrestling Olympian
- Joe Prunty — NBA Milwaukee Bucks assistant coach
- Jason Simontacchi — Washington Nationals baseball player
- Troy Tulowitzki — Toronto Blue Jays shortstop
- Peter Ueberroth — Olympic organizer, 1984 Time Man of the Year, commissioner of Major League Baseball
- Bruce Wilhelm — World's Strongest Man and Olympian in weightlifting
