= Daniel Seddiqui =

American economist

- Education: University of Southern California
- Occupations: Job-hunting expert and cultural analyst
- Organization: Living the Map
- Website: www.livingthemap.com

Daniel Seddiqui is widely considered the most traveled person in America, having been through 50 states over 30 times, including every city over 5,000 residents. His work focuses on history, migration, cultures, environments, and industries. Daniel is job-hunting and cultural analysis.

== Education ==
Seddiqui grew up in Los Altos, California and graduated from the University of Southern California in 2005 with a degree in economics. He was a track athlete at both the University of Oregon and USC

== Sources ==
- Simmons, Dan (October 15, 2009). "A jack-of-all-trades". Los Angeles Times.
- Abate, Tom (September 23, 2009). "Mission accomplished: 50 jobs in 50 states". San Francisco Chronicle. SFGate.
- Whiting, Corinne (January 12, 2022). "Writer, cross-country traveler visits Seattle and Spokane on his cultural tour of the United States". The Seattle Times.
- Gomez, Adrian (January 30, 2022). "Author working his way around the country making iconic items makes ABQ stop". The Albuquerque Journal.
- Jenkins, Hannah (February 3, 2024). "Author most traveled person in America sets sights on up". The Mining Journal.
