= Patrick Shyu =

American software industry commentator

Patrick Shyu, commonly known by his online alias TechLead, is a social media personality, entrepreneur, and former Google and Facebook employee. He is known for his posts about the software industry and about his philosophy about life and success. According to SheThePeople he is known for a dry sarcastic sense of humor.

== Career ==
Shyu worked at Google's San Bruno, California office for almost four years. He then joined Facebook in May 2018. Shyu was fired by Facebook on August 26, 2019, for reasons he attributes to his YouTube channel. He posted many videos in the immediate aftermath of his firing. He criticized Facebook's working culture at the time, comparing it to a popularity contest, and disliking the attention that employees give to Workplace, the company's internal social network.

== Criticism ==
In May 2022, Twitter users criticized TechLead for a series of tweets he posted, and later deleted, about women in tech. He said that when he worked at Google, he "rejected all women on-the-spot and trashed their resumes in front of them", told them "I'm smarter than you" and then "gave them an NP-hard problem and went home". He later told critics of these tweets to "get into Google first", before deleting all his previous tweets and posting (and later deleting) a tweet that read, in part, "opinions are not engraved in stone".
