= West San Jose =

- Region of San Jose, California
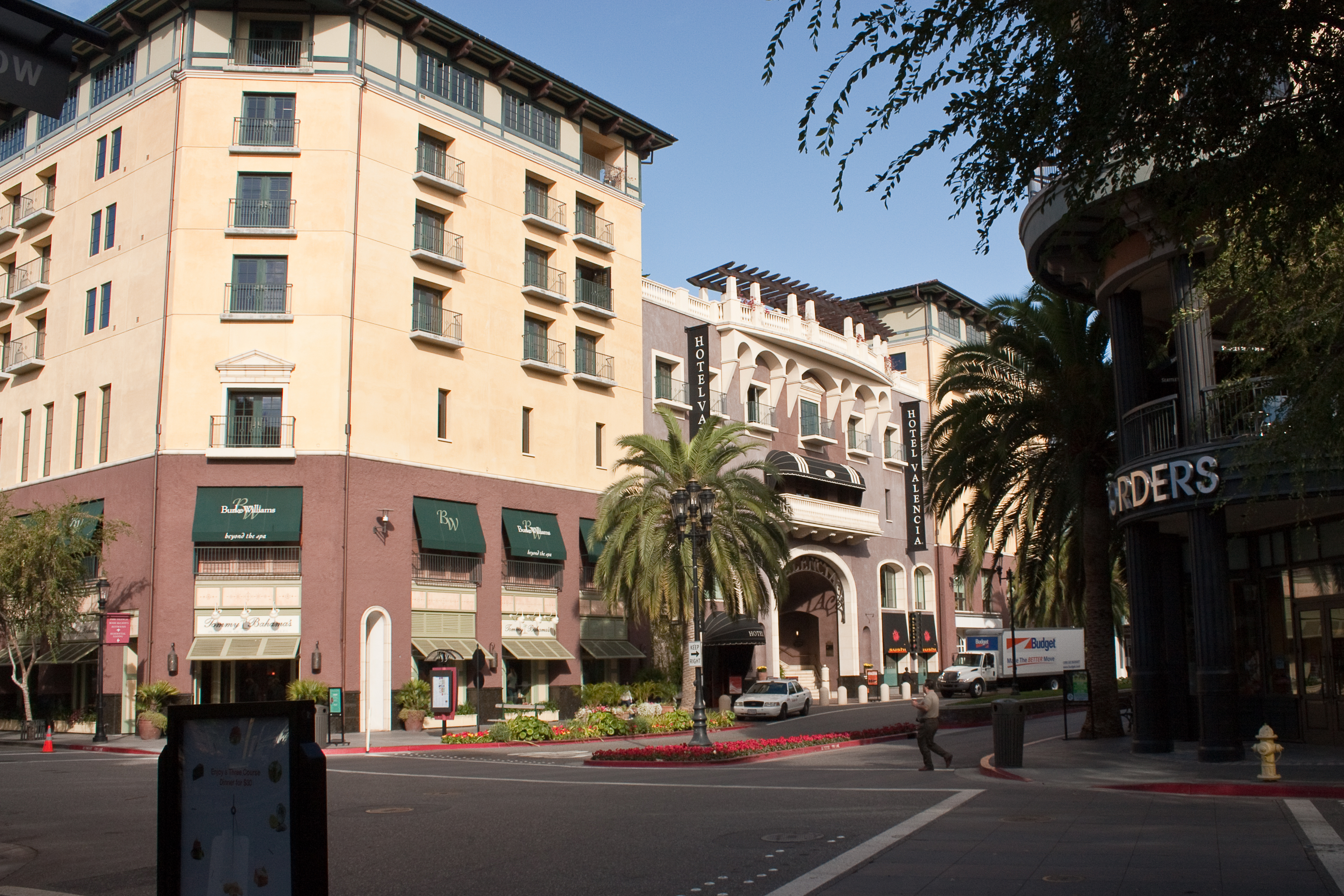
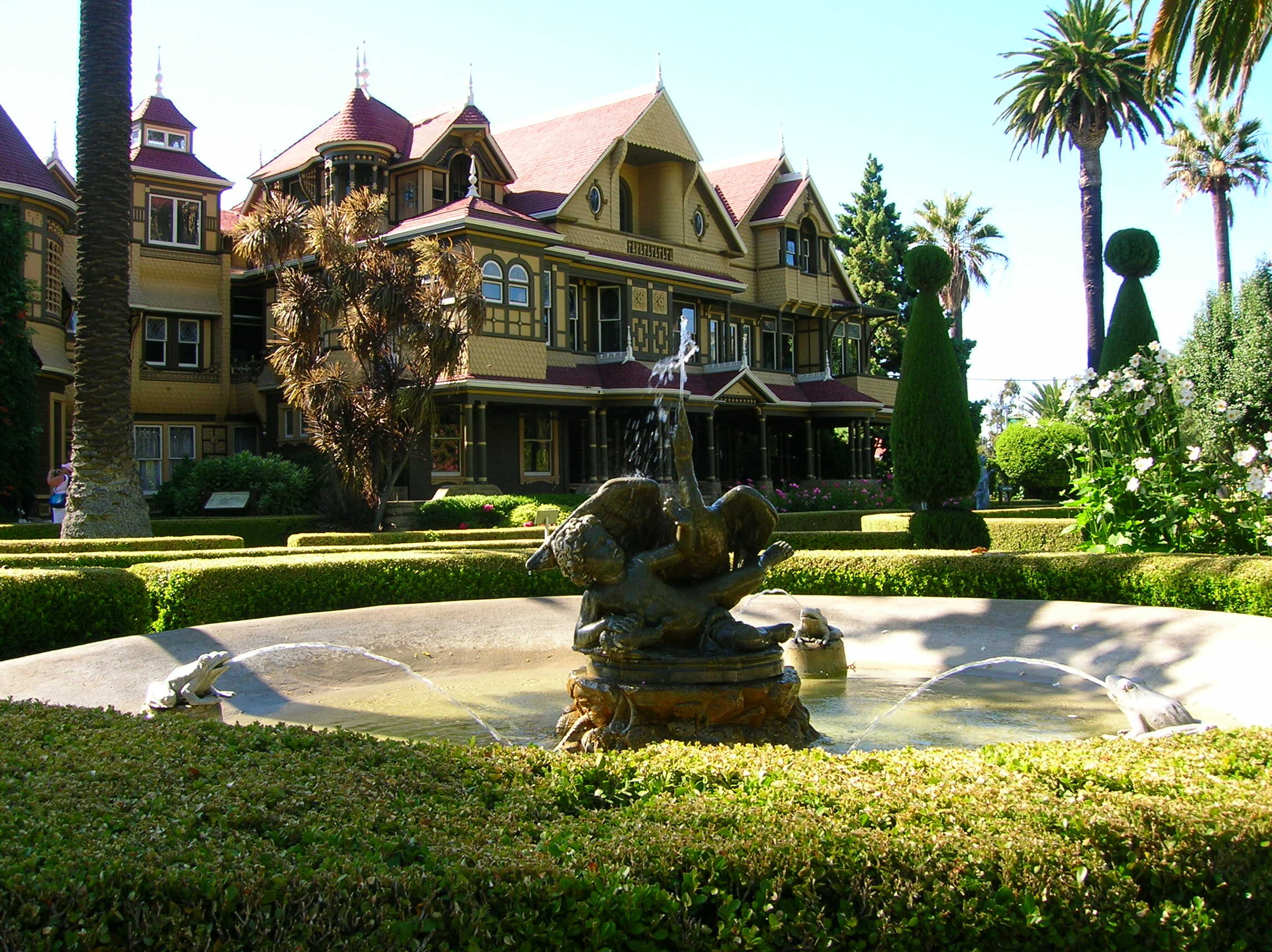
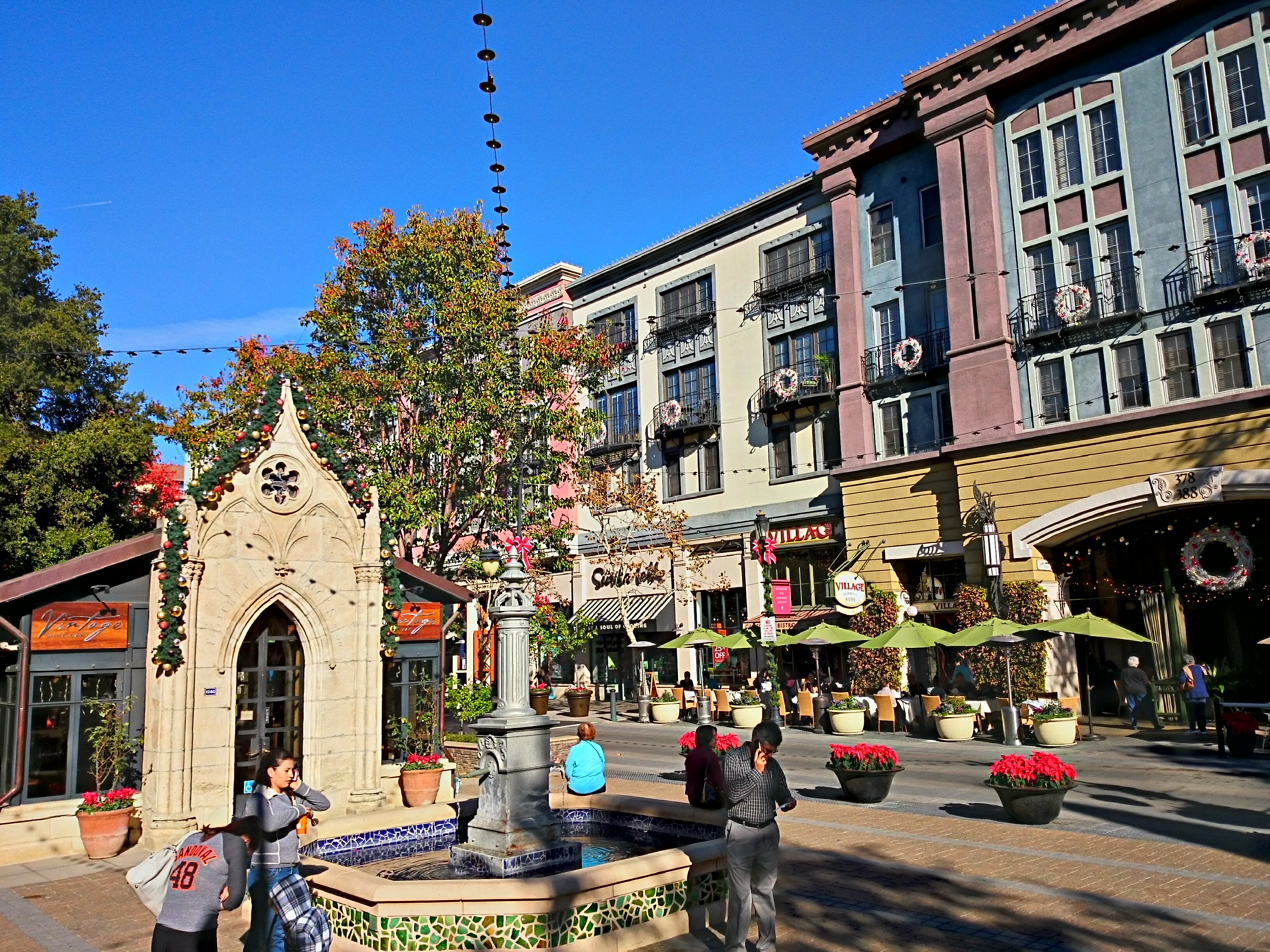
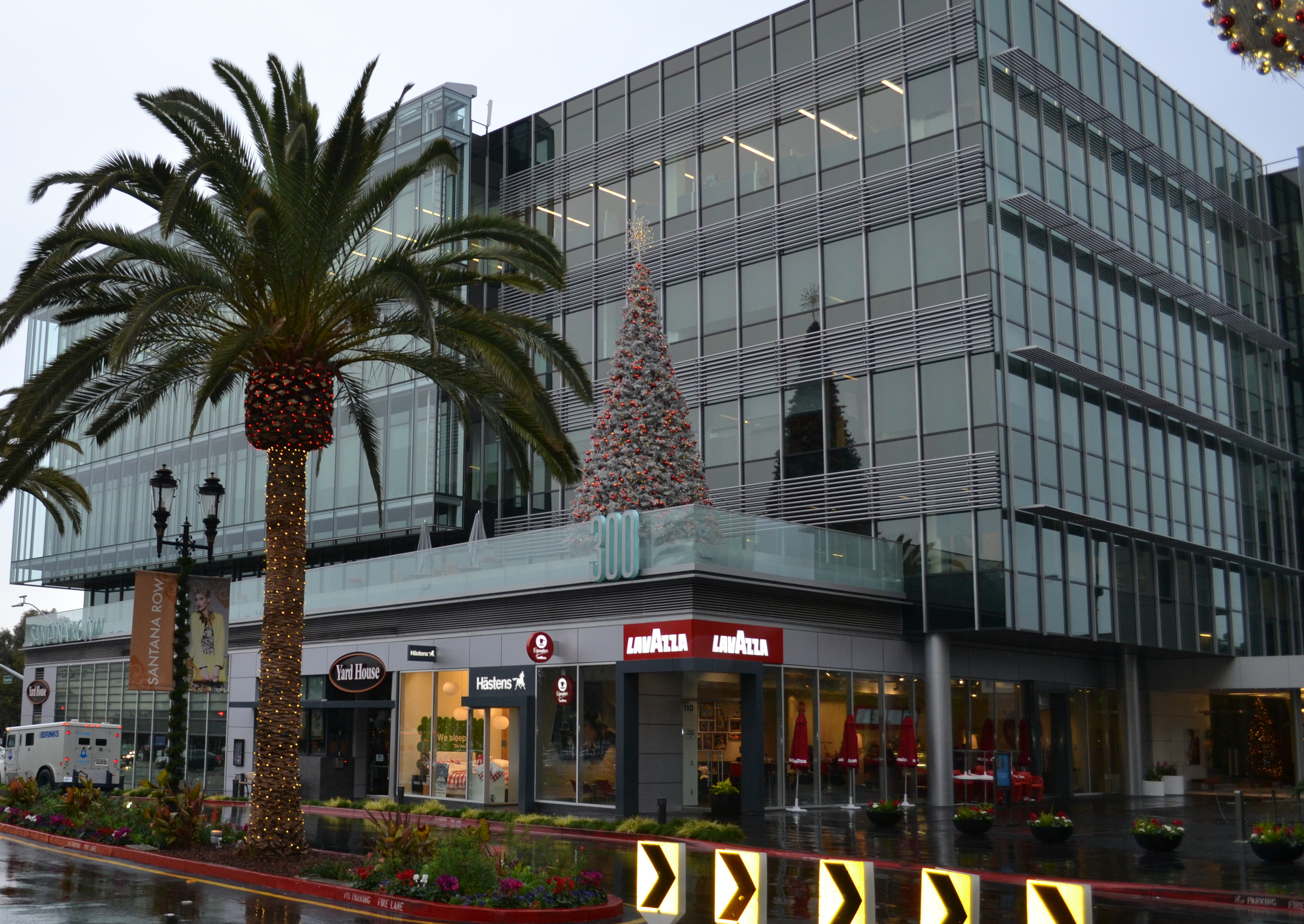
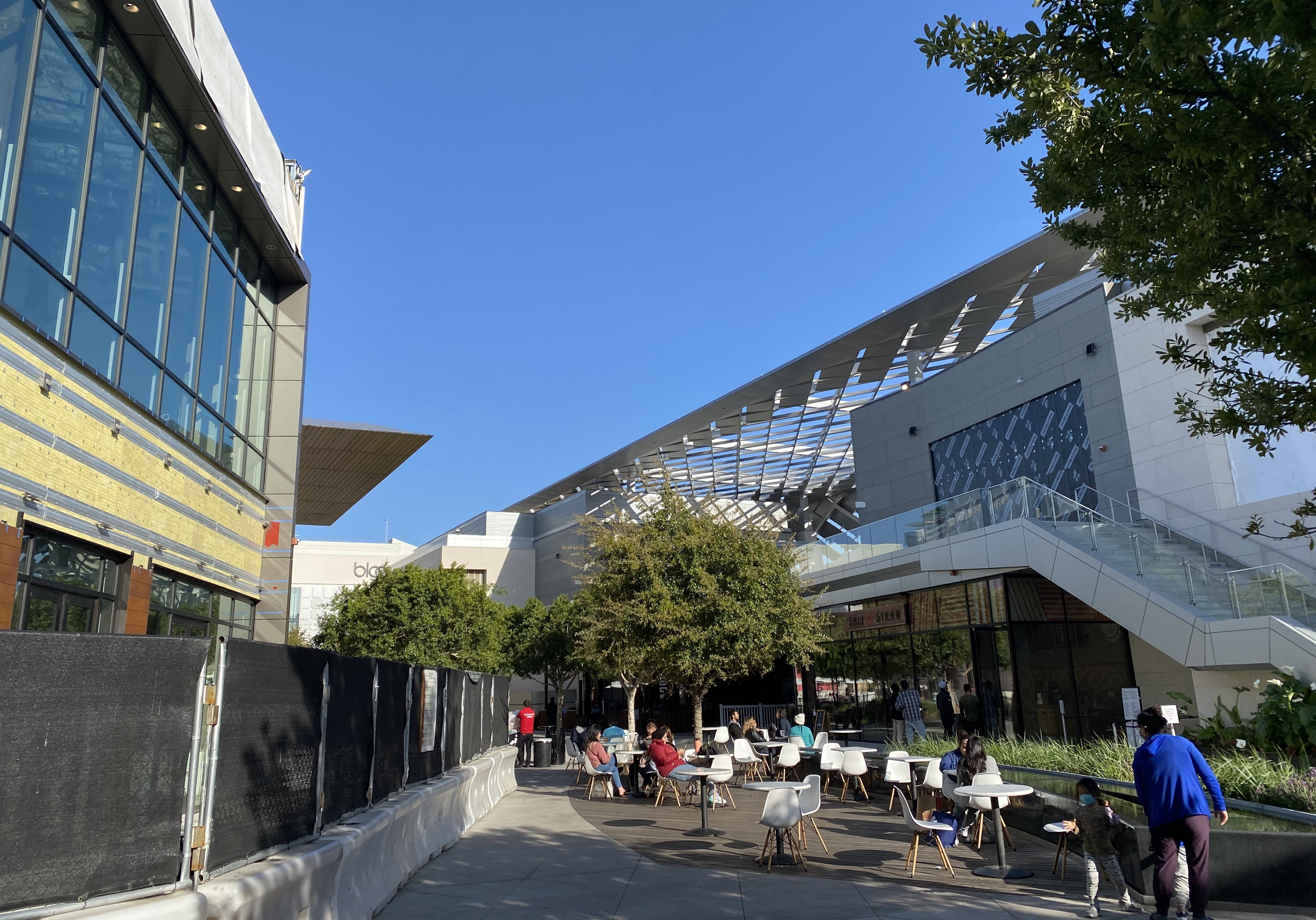
- Clockwise: Hotel Valencia; Santana Row; Westfield Valley Fair; Santana Row; Winchester Mystery House.

- Location within San Jose
- Coordinates: 37.312855°N 121.976364°W
- Country: United States
- State: California
- County: Santa Clara
- City: San Jose

West San Jose is the western region of San Jose, California, which borders the cities of Santa Clara, Cupertino, Saratoga, and Campbell. The area of West San Jose extends as far north as Stevens Creek Blvd, as far east State Route 17, as far south as State Route 85, and as far west as De Anza Boulevard. The region is primarily represented by San Jose City Council District 1.

Attractions in West San Jose include the historic Winchester Mystery House, Santana Row, and Westfield Valley Fair mall.

== History ==
The majority of homes in the area were built in the 1950s and were moderately priced housing at the time. However, with the growth the tech industry in Silicon Valley, West San Jose has become increasingly upscale. Mean housing values now exceed two million dollars, especially in the western portion of the region bordering Cupertino and Saratoga.

The area features the Winchester Mystery House, a California Historical Landmark and one of San Jose's most famous attractions. Additional historical landmarks include the now-closed Century 21 theater, the first Century theater, and the Moreland School.

== Education ==
The eastern portion of West San Jose is served by the Campbell Union School District and the Moreland School District. The western portion of the area is served by the Cupertino Union School District and the Fremont Union High School District.

Private high schools in the area include Archbishop Mitty High School and the Harker School.

== Landmarks ==
- Le Papillon, a French restaurant
- Santana Row, a shopping street
- Westfield Valley Fair, a shopping mall
- Westgate Mall, a shopping mall
