= Schoology =

Learning management system

- Founded: May 1, 2009
- Owner: PowerSchool (owned by Bain Capital)
- Founders: Jeremy Friedman; Ryan Hwang; Tim Trinidad
- Website: www.schoology.com
- Current status: Active

Schoology is a learning management system for schools and businesses, targeted mainly at schools. It is similar to the platform Google Classroom.

== Company History ==
Schoology was designed by Jeremy Friedman, Ryan Hwang, and Tim Trinidad in 2007 while studying at Washington University in St. Louis. Originally designed for sharing notes, features were gradually added and modified. Schoology secured its first round of equity financing, totaling about $1,100,000, with an investment of unknown origin in 2009 and an investment by Meakam Becker Venture Capital in June 2010. In 2012, Schoology raised $6 million in a round led by Firstmark Capital; in 2014, Schoology raised $15 million in a funding round led by Intel Capital; in November 2015, Schoology raised $32 million in a funding round, led by JMI Equity. In November 2013, Schoology had over 7.5 million users across about 60,000 schools. Schoology was acquired by PowerSchool (owned by Bain Capital) in November 2019.

== Functions ==
Among Schoology's features are attendance records, grades, exams, and homework. The interface consists of a list of task and links to folders and assignments for students. Schoology can be integrated with the school's current grading system. Visually, Schoology is very similar to the environment of many social networks. It has permanently replaced the uses of other virtual classrooms in classrooms all around the world and serves as a way to distribute digital assignments and announcements to students.
