= Monta Vista High School =

Location
- 21840 McClellan Road; Cupertino, California 95014; United States; 37°18′52″N 122°03′24″W

Information
- Type: Public secondary school
- Established: 1969
- School district: Fremont Union High School District
- Principal: Ben Clausnitzer
- Grades: 9–12
- Enrollment: 1,630 (2024-2025)
- Colors: Purple and gold
- Athletics conference: Santa Clara Valley Athletic League
- Mascot: Matador
- Newspaper: El Estoque
- Yearbook: El Valedor
- Website: mvhs.fuhsd.org
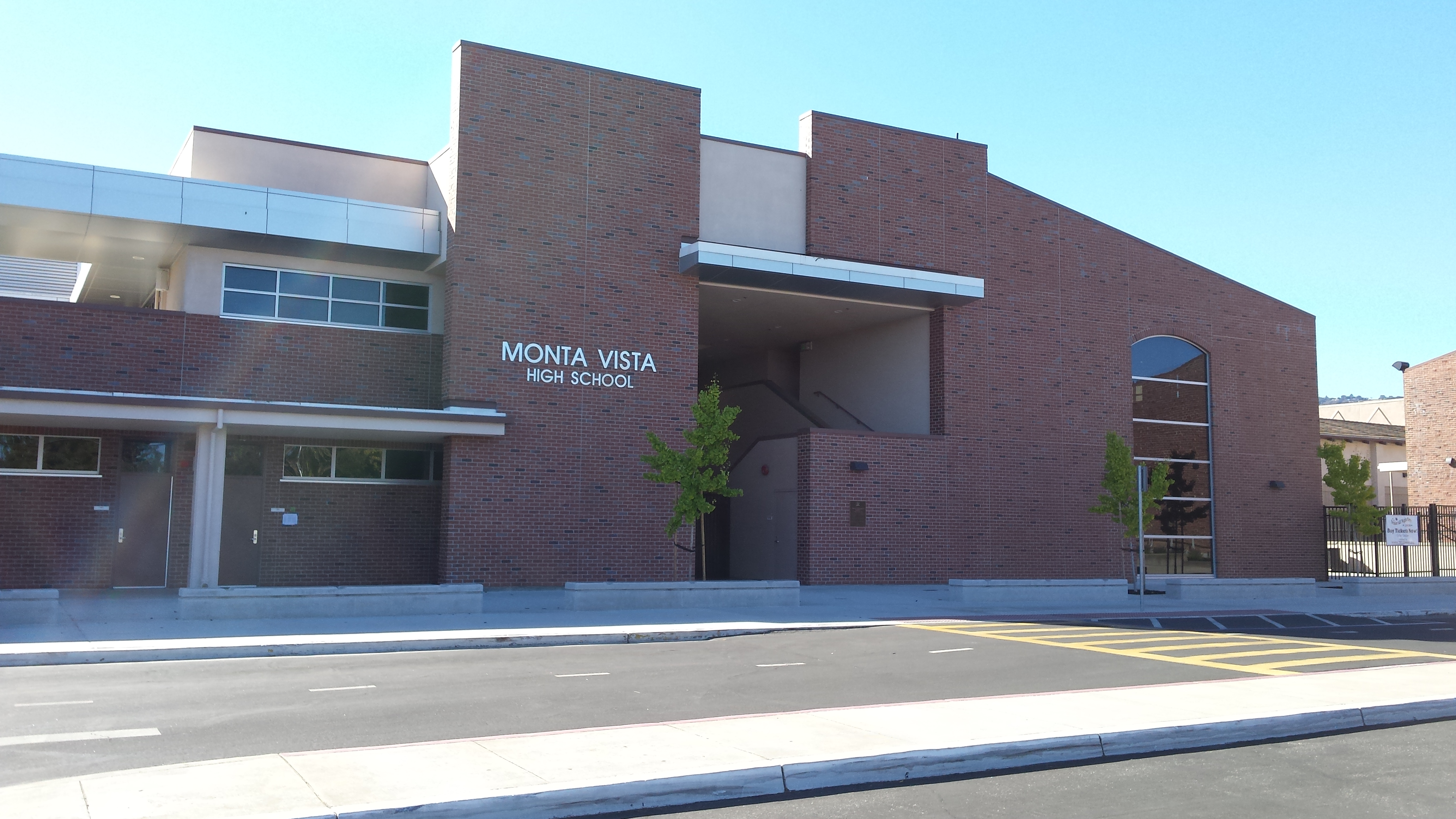
- Monta Vista High School main entrance

Monta Vista High School is a four-year public high school in Cupertino, California. Part of the Fremont Union High School District, the school serves most of the area of western Cupertino. In 2025, Monta Vista was ranked by U.S. News as the 129th best high school in the United States.

== History ==
Monta Vista High opened in 1969.

In 2014, a new field, track, and stadium were built along with a new student union and newly renovated cafeteria and six classrooms.

On November 8, 2024, Monta Vista High School went into lockdown owing to false reports of an active shooter. All students and staff were released after sheriffs completed their search of the campus and gave the all-clear.

== Statistics ==
=== Demographics ===
2023-2024

- 1811 students

Asian	White	Hispanic	Two or more races	African American	Pacific Lander	American Indian
79%	7.2%	4.6%	8.6%	0.06%	0.37%	0.49%

== Notable alumni ==
- Cathy Ang – Actress
- Matthew Axelson – Navy Seal
- Suchir Balaji – Artificial intelligence researcher
- Amir Bashti – professional soccer player
- Dylan Fergus – Actor
- Ryan Hancock – Professional baseball player
- Andrew He – Competitive Programmer
- Zach Hsieh – Social media personality
- Sheryl Johnson – Field hockey coach, member of the US Olympic field hockey team
- Paul Kim – Korean American musician, Singer and Rapper
- Anirudh Kilambi – General Manager of the Washington Nationals (MLB)
- Kyle Kingsbury – UFC fighter
- Andrew Martinez – "The Naked Guy" at the University of California, Berkeley
- DJ Patil – Chief Data Scientist of the United States
- Adam Peters – General manager of the Washington Commanders (NFL)
- Daniel Puder – MMA fighter
- Ron Reis – WCW wrestler
- Robert Rothbart – Professional Basketball Player
- Stephanie Sheh – Voice Actress
- Patrick Shyu – Social media personality
- Beth A. Simmons – Professor and Academic
- Leah Thomas – Professional Cyclist, US Olympic road cyclist
- Vance Walberg – Basketball Coach
- Angela Zhang – Scientist
