= California Distinguished School =

Award given to public schools in California

California Distinguished School is an award given by the California State Board of Education to public schools (including charter schools) within the state that best represent exemplary and quality educational programs. Approximately 5-10% of California schools are awarded this honor each year following a selection process. It is one of many programs in the California School Recognition Program (CSRP) and is funded by CSRP sponsors.

== Program ==
The program was established in 1985 and alternates each year between elementary (even years) and secondary (odd years) schools. In the past, schools that were recognized as distinguished held the title for four years. Currently, schools that are recognized as distinguished hold the title for two years, and after that the recognition may be renewed. Eligibility criteria are subject to change between award cycles.

== Eligibility ==
=== California School Dashboard ===
For 2020, the California Distinguished Schools Program will use the accountability metrics compiled on the public California School Dashboard. The Dashboard is a website available to the public and geared toward parents and non-educators. The California Department of Education states "The Dashboard is a key component of California’s five-year overhaul of the state’s school accountability system." The Dashboard is not just an interface, but relevant to award criteria because it "replaces the state’s former accountability system—the Academic Performance Index (API), which relied exclusively on standardized tests and gave schools a single score. That system was suspended (in 2014)." The Dashboard compiles local and state information about schools and helps users compare schools against state performance. Details for each metric are included and then summarized by a score on a color graph. The scoring pattern is red ("lowest performance"), to orange, yellow, green, up to Blue ("highest performance").

Details about the California Distinguished Schools application are issued from the California State Superintendent of Public Instruction (Tony Thurmond) and disclosed to School Principals, County and District Superintendents, and Charter School Administrators. Schools communicate with their County Coordinator for the California School Recognition Program to submit the application.

=== Award criteria ===
Awardees will fall into two categories: "Closing the Achievement Gap," and "Exceptional Student Performance."

==== "Closing the Achievement Gap" criteria ====
- Poverty Rate of at least 40 percent in the prior two school years.
- Highest percent of growth that met standard in English Language Arts (ELA) OR Mathematics between the two prior school years for the student groups targeted in those years (e.g. English Learners, Foster Youth. See Dashboard website for full listing).
- The ALL student group must be Blue/Green on both ELA and Mathematics using Dashboard data for the prior completed school year.
- The ALL student group must be Blue/Green/Yellow on the Suspension Rate Indicator using Dashboard data for the prior completed school year
- The ALL student group must be Blue/Green/Yellow on the Chronic Absenteeism Indicator using Dashboard data for the prior completed school year.
- 95 percent participation rate in the prior two school years for both ELA and Mathematics.

==== "Exceptional Student Performance" criteria ====
- The ALL student group must be Blue in both ELA and Mathematics using Dashboard data for the prior completed school year.
- The ALL student group must be Blue on the Suspension Rate Indicator using Dashboard data for the prior completed school year.
- The ALL student group must be Blue on the Chronic Absenteeism Indicator using Dashboard data for the prior completed school year
- 95 percent participation rate in the prior two school years for both ELA and Mathematics.

== Program funding ==
The California Distinguished Schools Program receives funding from California School Recognition Program Sponsors. Sponsors include companies such as Comcast, programs such as the California State Lottery, and special interest groups such as the California Teachers Association.

== Historical criticism and response ==
In 2001, the Los Angeles Times wrote an article identifying complaints with the program's selection process. Times author Jessica Garrison wrote that, at the time, the application process required that "schools must score in the top half of the state’s Academic Performance Index and write an exhaustive, 10-section application describing everything from campus culture to library services." The critique primarily focused on the lack of incentive, resources, and recognition for lower-performing schools that make significant improvements. The article also lamented the lack of rigorous data to back applicant's claims of student success.

=== Historical Interim Award Program ===
Between 2015 and 2017, the California Department of Education awarded the California Gold Ribbon School designation for three years while California transitioned to its new assessment and accountability system. It returned to the California Distinguished School system beginning in 2018.
