= Santa Clara County Library District =

Public library system in California, United States

Coordinates: 37.255187°N 121.965792°W

- Location: Santa Clara County, California
- Established: 1914
- Branches: 8

Collection
- Size: 2,382,642

Access and use
- Circulation: 11,000,422
- Population served: 454,040
- Members: 368,314

Other information
- Budget: $76,282,817
- Director: Jennifer Weeks
- Employees: 339.6 FTE
- Website: sccld.org

The Santa Clara County Library District is a public library system for Santa Clara County headquartered in Campbell, California. The library serves the communities and cities of Campbell, Cupertino, Gilroy, Los Altos, Los Altos Hills, Milpitas, Monte Sereno, Morgan Hill, Saratoga, and all unincorporated areas of Santa Clara County. Other cities in Santa Clara County run their own library systems. In addition to these libraries, the library provides mobile library service with a bookmobile which visits preschools, retirement communities, migrant farmworker camps, and rural communities without easy access to library services. In 2020, SCCLD also launched a new website featuring a 24/7 online library.

Branch libraries include Campbell Library, Cupertino Library, Gilroy Library, Los Altos Library, Woodland Branch Library (Los Altos), Milpitas Library, Morgan Hill Library, and Saratoga Library.

The Santa Clara County Library District has been repeatedly recognized as a Star library by Library Journal with its most recent ranking of five stars making it one of the top library systems on its size in the county. The Santa Clara County Library has a combined collection totaling more than 2.3 million items and served a combined population of 454,040.

== History ==
=== 1914–1958 ===
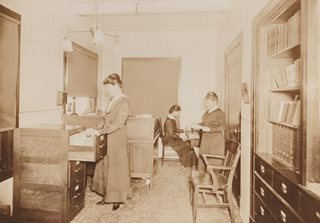
Miss Stella Huntington (at left), Miss Ora Regnart (at right), and Miss Elizabeth Stevens (center), in 1916

In July 1914, Santa Clara County began operating a county library. Stella Huntington was appointed the first County Librarian and to begin operations, she purchased a typewriter, dictionary, and a desk with two chairs. In the first year of service the collection consisted of "6,127 books and reached a circulation of 49,048." Two years earlier, a one-cent tax had been levied for the purpose of supporting a county library. It provided $3,700 for the first year of operation. Seventeen branches were opened; the population of Santa Clara County at that time was approximately 90,000.

Miss Elizabeth Stevens, later Mrs. Elizabeth Singletary, was appointed as the second County Librarian (1925–1959). By 1932, the Library operated on a budget of $25,000 and had a total of 30 branch libraries. In December 1932, the County Library assumed responsibility for library service to all County schools except those in San Jose, Palo Alto, and Santa Clara City.

During the 1950s, Santa Clara County experienced tremendous growth and urbanization. By 1955, the County Library collection numbered 404,426 with a total circulation of 1,037,257. A staff of 45 provided service at 13 rural branches, 2 bookmobiles, and up to 116 elementary schools. In 1958, the Santa Clara County Board of Supervisors approved a study conducted by Emerson Greenaway, then President of the American Library Association, that recommended a shift from a rural library system to an urban system. The study recommended hiring professional staff, developing larger book collections, and moving from storefront to appropriate library facilities.

=== 1959–1991 ===
George Farrier became the third County Librarian in 1959 and oversaw the creation of the County Library Commission and similar library commissions in each community.

By 1968, the library tax rate had increased to 18 cents to support the library system's strategic goals. Nine dedicated library buildings had been constructed, beginning with the Los Altos Library in 1964 and ending with the Milpitas Library in 1983.

Barbara Campbell was appointed the County Librarian in 1973. In 1978 California State Proposition 13 passed, reducing the library's property tax revenues by half.

The Reading Program, an adult literacy tutoring and support service of the Santa Clara County Library, was started in 1985 as an early member of the State Library's California Literacy Campaign. The Reading Program served county residents in both the Santa Clara County Library and the Mountain View Public Library jurisdictions. The same year the County Library became a part of the newly formed Santa Clara County Public Services Agency and Susan Fuller became the fifth County Librarian.

Residents of Los Altos and Los Altos Hills voted a tax override measure to restore funding lost through Proposition 13. The tax took effect in 1986 and was renewed in 1990. The tax paid for additional hours, materials and staffing at the Los Altos Library and the Woodland Branch Library.

=== 1992–present ===
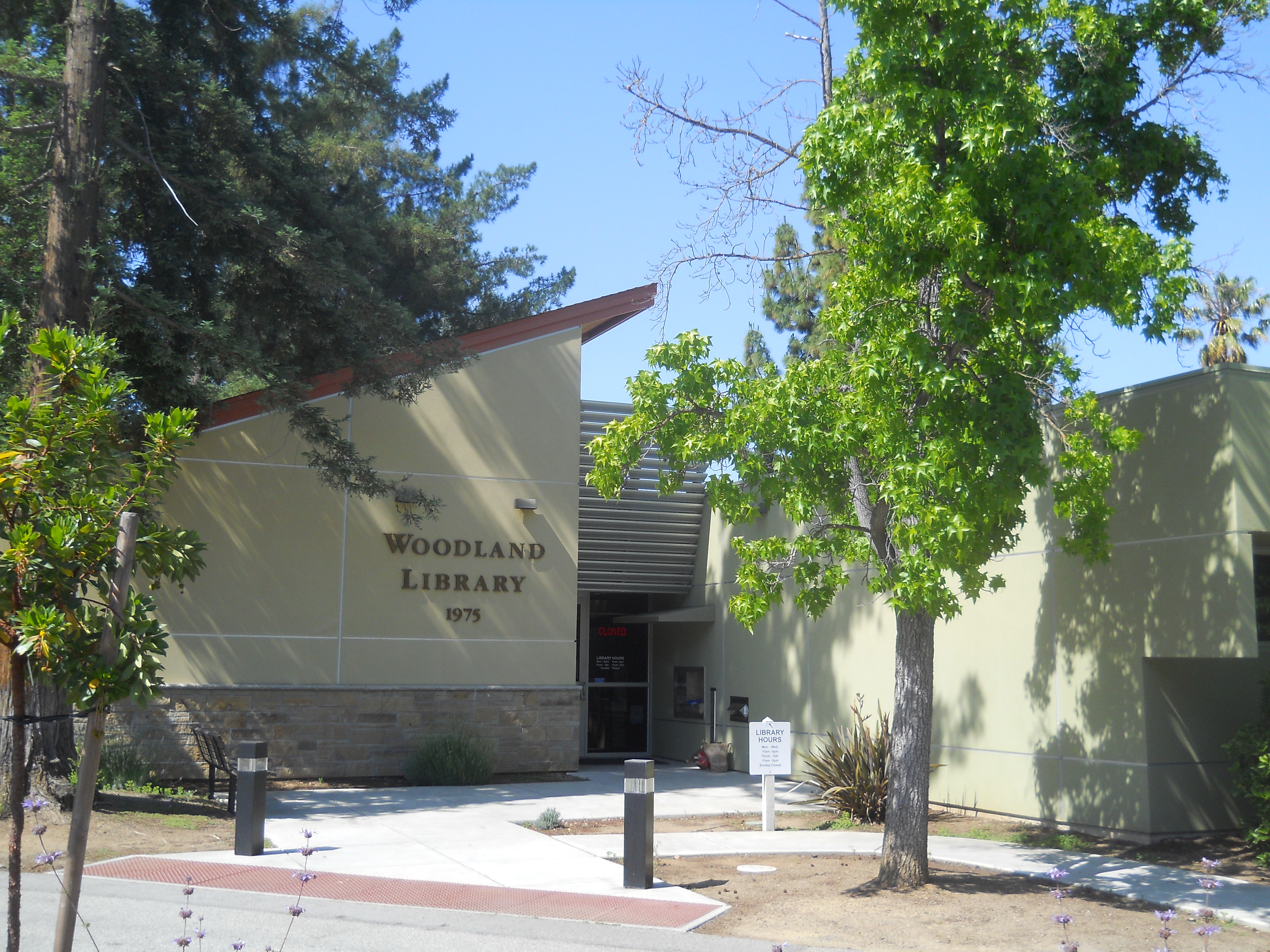
Woodland branch library, Los Altos

In 1992, the County Library again became an independent department reporting to the County Executive as a result of the disbanding of the Public Service Agency. The following year, California State tax law changed reducing library funding by 40%, resulting in layoffs and reduced open hours.

In 1994 voters approved an annual parcel assessment to fund the nine libraries that make up the Santa Clara County Library District by over a two-thirds majority vote. This ten-year assessment expired in June 2005. The measure also created a special library district that shifted governance from the County Board of Supervisors to a Joint Powers Authority. The JPA Board consists of representatives from each of the nine city councils and two members of the Santa Clara County Board of Supervisors.

Susan Fuller was selected as the Librarian of the Year by Library Journal in 1998. Hennen's American Public Library Rating Index ranked the library second in comparable population sizes in 1999. In 2000, the library was ranked number one.

Melinda Cervantes became the County Librarian in 2002. The Library was again ranked number one by Hennen's American Public Library Rating Index.

In March 2004, Santa Clara County Measure B fell just short of the required two-thirds vote for approval. The measure would have extended the assessment approved in 1994. As a result of the budget shortfall, Santa Clara County Libraries were forced to close one day each week.

In May 2005, residents of Santa Clara County voted to continue their funding of the Santa Clara County Library by passing Measure A with a 72% "Yes" vote. Measure A continues an existing tax and provides the library with $5.4 million per year. Measure B, which would have added another $1.9 million per year, failed to pass, receiving 64% of the vote, less than the required two-thirds.

In late 2006, the Library introduced wireless service and a new automated materials handling system in each library and at the Library Administration Offices.

Since 2000, plans to remodel, expand and construct new libraries have been underway. The greatly expanded Saratoga Library (at 48,500 square feet) funded by a local bond measure opened in June 2003. The Cupertino Library (at 54,000 square feet) supported with an advisory vote was funded by the City of Cupertino's General Fund and opened in October 2004. The Morgan Hill Library (at 28,000 square feet) was constructed with City Redevelopment Agency funds and opened on July 21, 2007. City Redevelopment Agency and Transient Occupancy Tax dollars funded the Milpitas Library (at 60,000 square feet) in January 2009. The newly remodeled Woodland Branch Library (at 4,600 square feet) located in Los Altos and jointly funded by the City and the Library reopened in March 2010. Groundbreaking for the new Gilroy Library (at 53,500 square feet) took place in July 2010 and the replacement building on the same site was dedicated on April 27, 2012. In early 2021, renovations started on the Campbell Library and the libraries functions shifted temporarily to the Campbell Community Center.

In 2009, the Library began migrating to RFID (radio frequency identification) technology.

In 2012 Nancy Howe was appointed as the seventh County Librarian, and the new Gilroy Library, which was Gold LEED (Leadership in Energy and Environmental Design) certified, opened at 350 West Sixth Street.

From mid-2011 to mid-2015, the library district charged non-residents an $80 library card fee; the board voted in October 2014 to remove this fee.

In March 2017 the district again added a second bookmobile.

In March 2020 Nancy Howe retired and Jennifer Weeks was appointed Acting County Librarian. She officially became the eighth County Librarian in SCCLD's history in late May 2020. The early part of Weeks' tenure was marked by the response to the COVID-19 outbreak, which forced the closure of all library services. A curbside pickup and item drop-off service was established that June. By April 2021, all SCCLD Community libraries had reopened to patrons, with the Woodland Branch reopening that June. By the fall of 2021 SCCLD had restored Sunday hours at each of its libraries, except for the limited space Campbell Express.

== See also ==
- San José Public Library
- Santa Clara City Library
- Stanford University Libraries
- Sunnyvale Public Library
