= Sunnyvale, California =

City in California, United States

- City
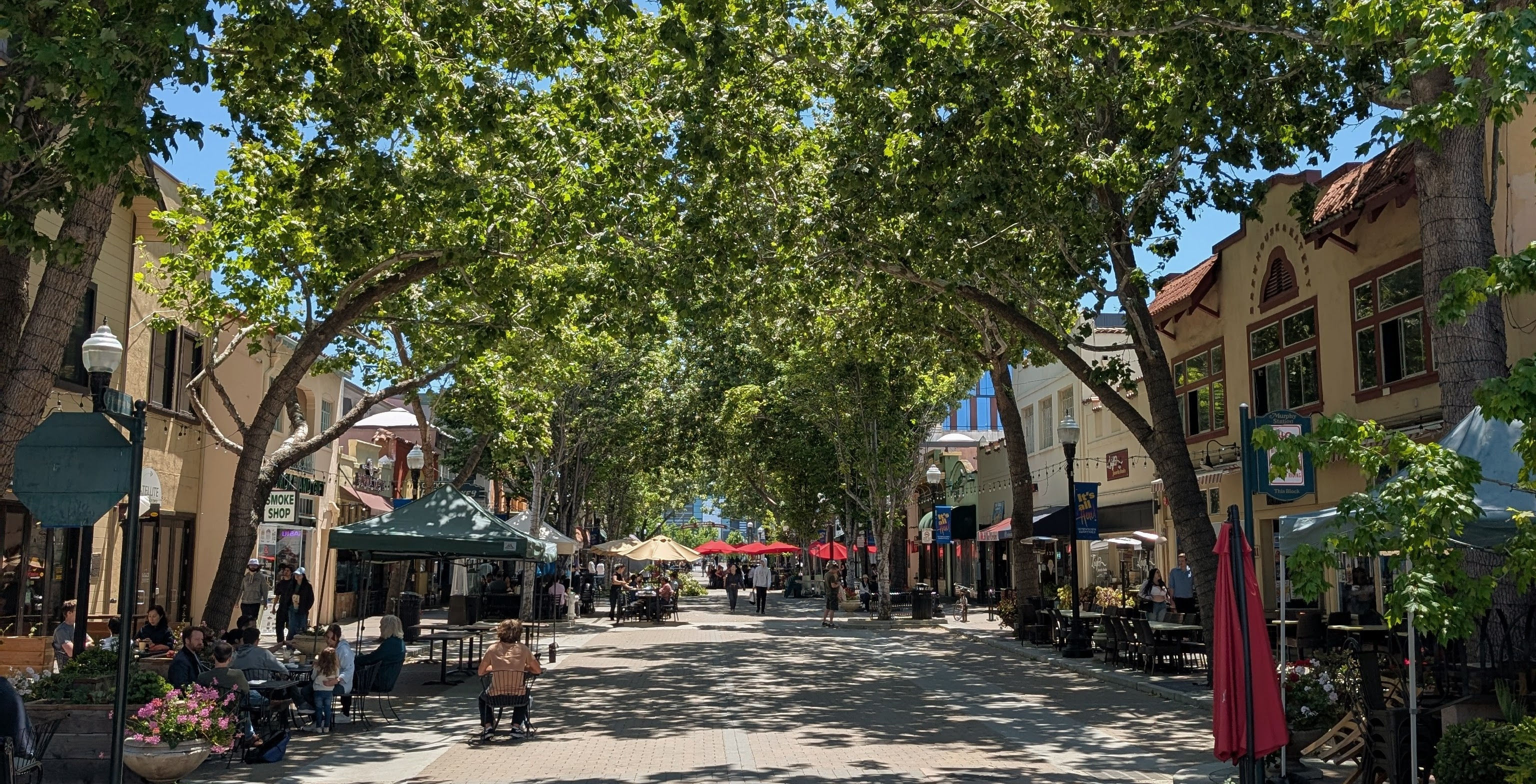
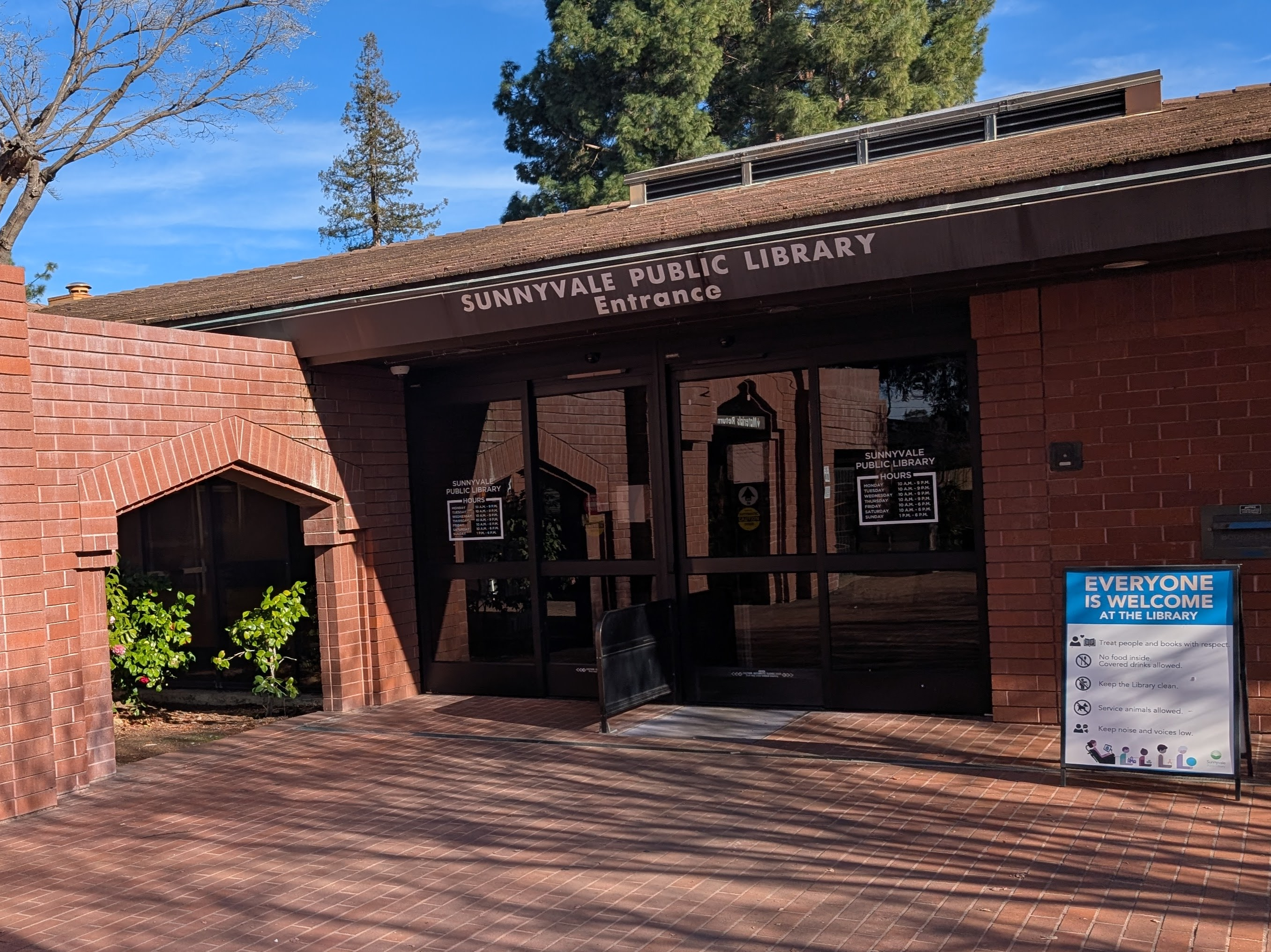
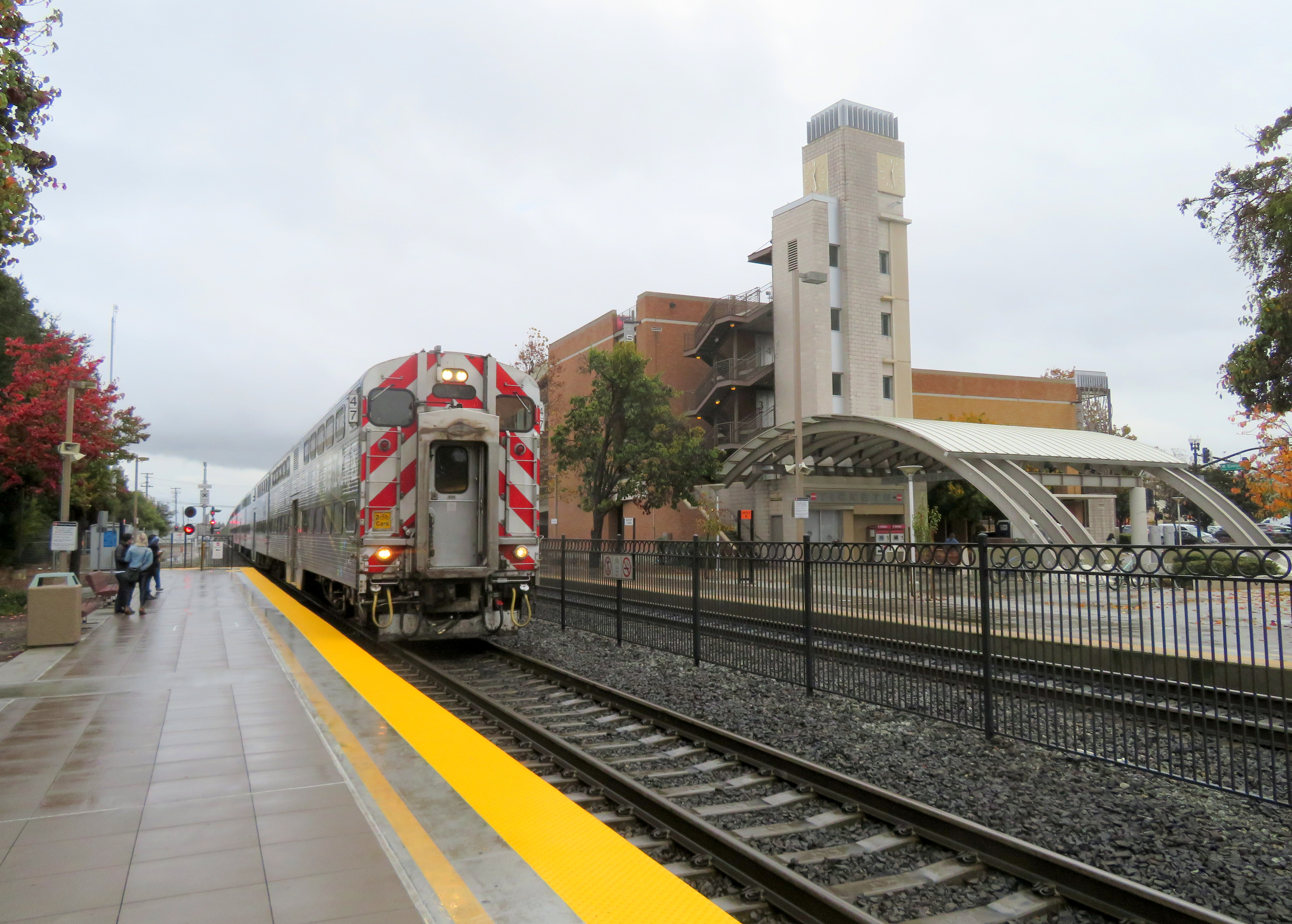
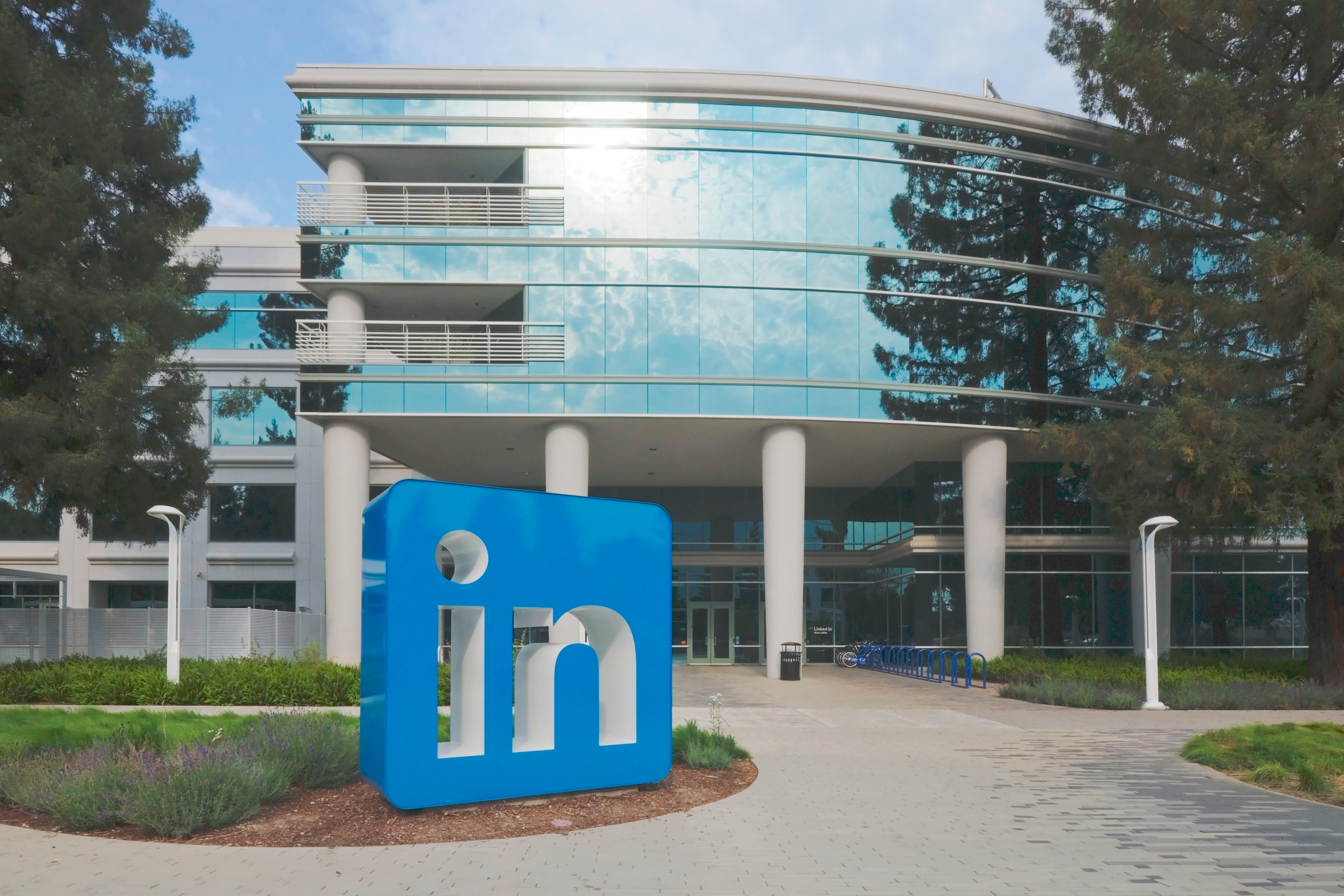
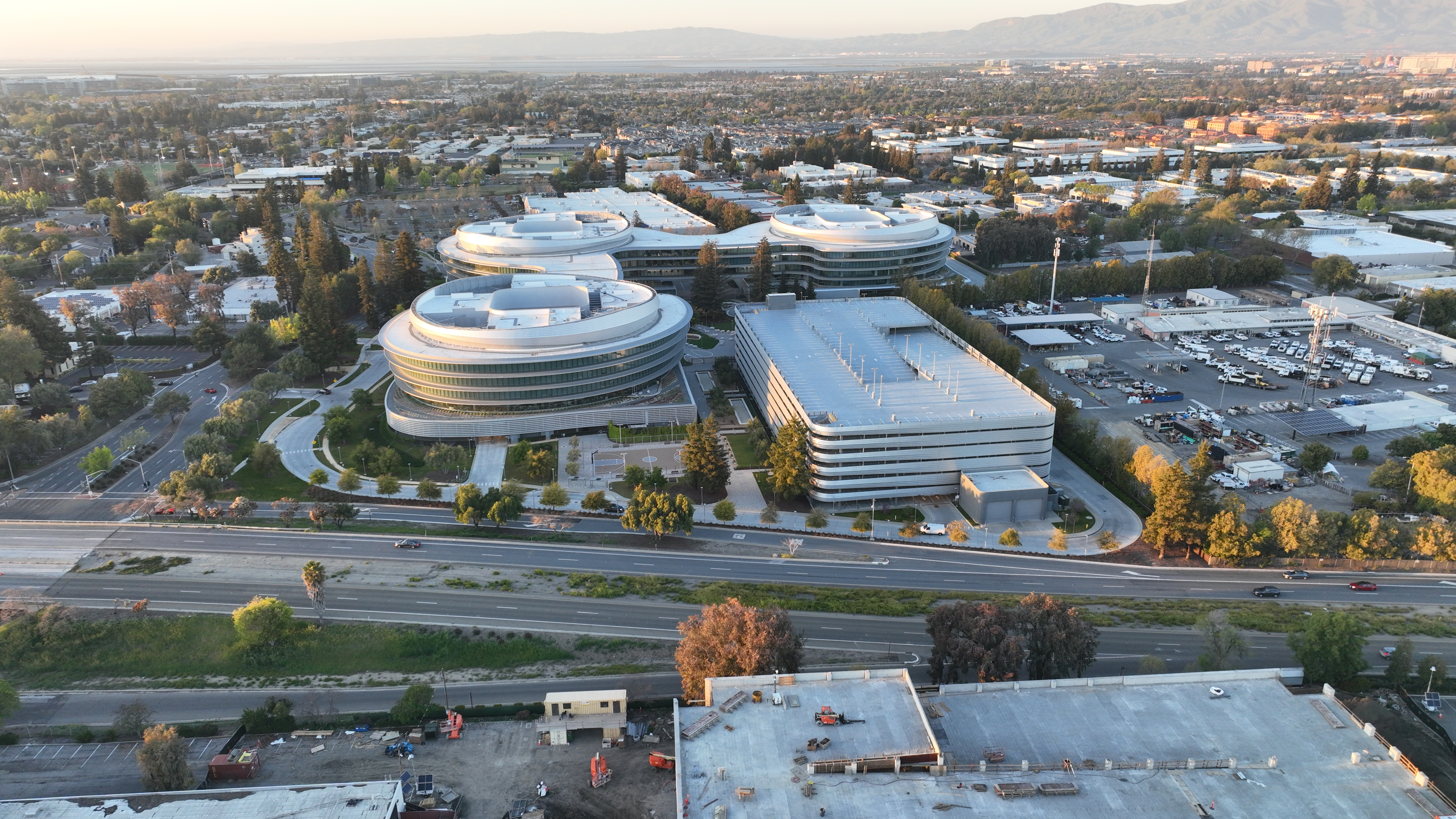
- Downtown Sunnyvale Sunnyvale Public Library Sunnyvale station LinkedIn headquarters Apple Campus 3

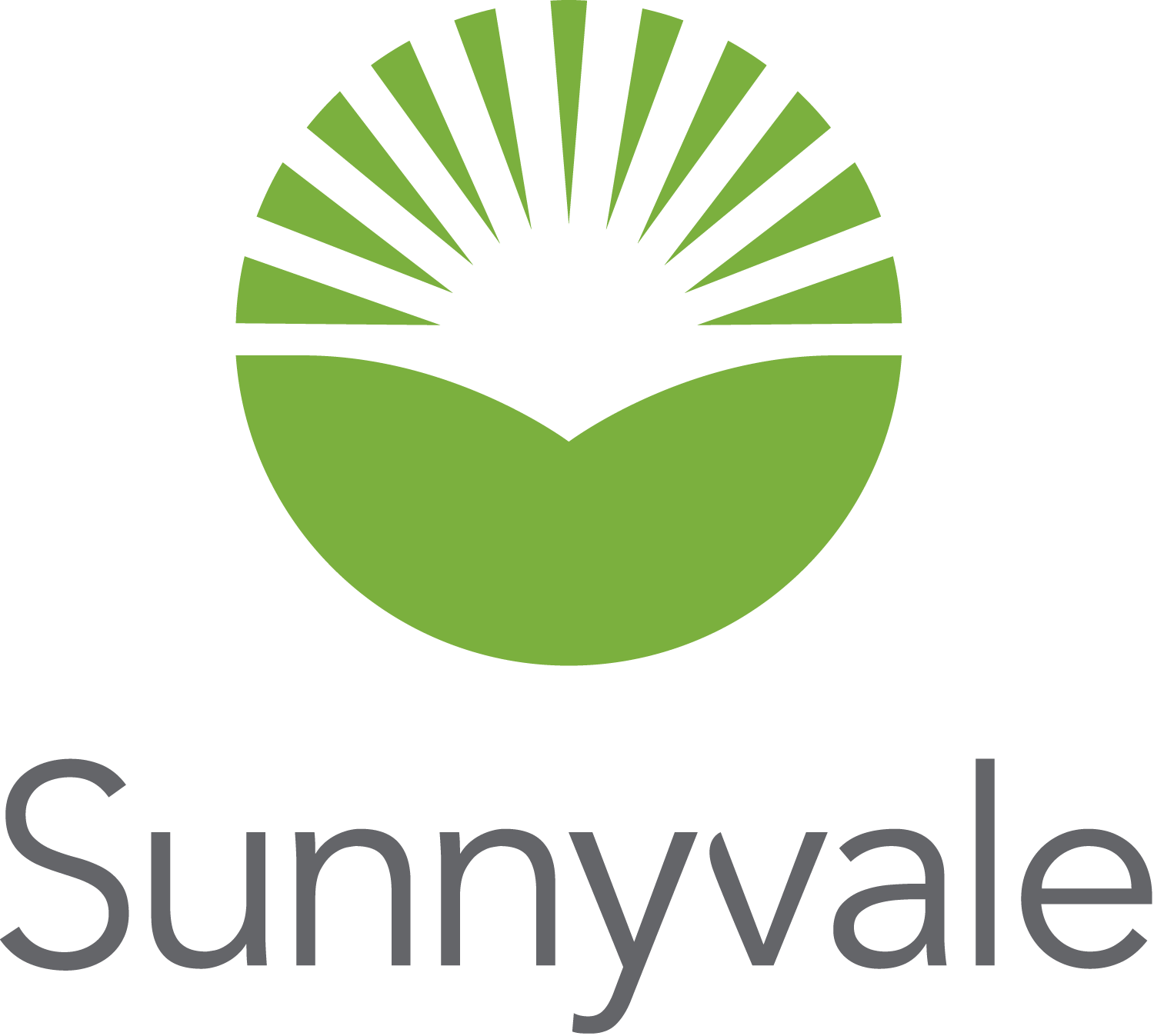
- Seal
- Interactive map of Sunnyvale, California
- Location in the United States
- Coordinates: 37°22′16″N 122°2′15″W
- Country: United States
- State: California
- County: Santa Clara
- Incorporated: December 24, 1912

Government
  - Type: Council–manager
  - Mayor: Larry Klein
  - Vice mayor: Richard Mehlinger
  - City Manager: Tim Kirby

Area
  - Total: 22.78 sq mi (58.99 km^{2})
  - Land: 22.06 sq mi (57.14 km^{2})
  - Water: 0.72 sq mi (1.86 km^{2}) 3.15%
- Elevation: 125 ft (38 m)

Population (2020)
  - Total: 155,805
  - Rank: 2nd in Santa Clara County; 36th in California; 174th in the United States
  - Density: 7,062/sq mi (2,727/km^{2})
- Time zone: UTC−8 (PST)
  - Summer (DST): UTC−7 (PDT)
- ZIP codes: 94085–94090
- Area codes: 408/669 and 650
- FIPS code: 06-77000
- GNIS feature IDs: 1656344, 2412009
- Website: sunnyvale.ca.gov

Sunnyvale (/ˈsʌniveɪl/) is a city in the Santa Clara Valley in northwestern Santa Clara County, California, United States.

Sunnyvale lies along the historic El Camino Real and Highway 101 and is bordered by the San Francisco Bay to the north, Moffett Federal Airfield and NASA Ames Research Center to the northwest, Mountain View to the northwest, Los Altos to the southwest, Cupertino to the south, and Santa Clara to the east. A small section of the border near Sunnyvale Baylands Park meets the city of San Jose (specifically the Alviso region) to the east and north.

Sunnyvale's population was 155,805 at the 2020 census, making it the second most populous city in the county (after San Jose) and the seventh most populous city in the San Francisco Bay Area.

As one of the major cities that make up California's high-tech area known as Silicon Valley, Sunnyvale is the birthplace of the video game industry, the former location of Atari's headquarters. Many technology companies are headquartered in Sunnyvale, with several aerospace and defense companies operating there as well.

Sunnyvale was also the home to Onizuka Air Force Station, often called "the Blue Cube" because of the color and shape of its windowless main building. The facility, previously known as Sunnyvale Air Force Station, was named for the deceased Space Shuttle Challenger astronaut Ellison Onizuka. It served as an artificial satellite control facility of the U.S. military until August 2010 and has since been decommissioned and demolished.

Sunnyvale is one of the few California municipalities to have a single unified Department of Public Safety, where all personnel are trained as firefighters, police officers, and EMTs so that they can respond to an emergency in any of those roles.

== History ==
The Santa Clara Valley was heavily populated by the indigenous Ohlone people when the Spanish first arrived in the 1770s. After the Spaniards arrived, smallpox, measles, and other Old World diseases greatly reduced the Ohlone population. Many of the Ohlone Indians who did not die of these diseases were converted to the Christian faith by the Spanish. In 1777, Franciscan missionary Padre Junipero Serra founded Mission Santa Clara in San Jose (near what is now the San Jose International Airport runway).

=== 1800s ===
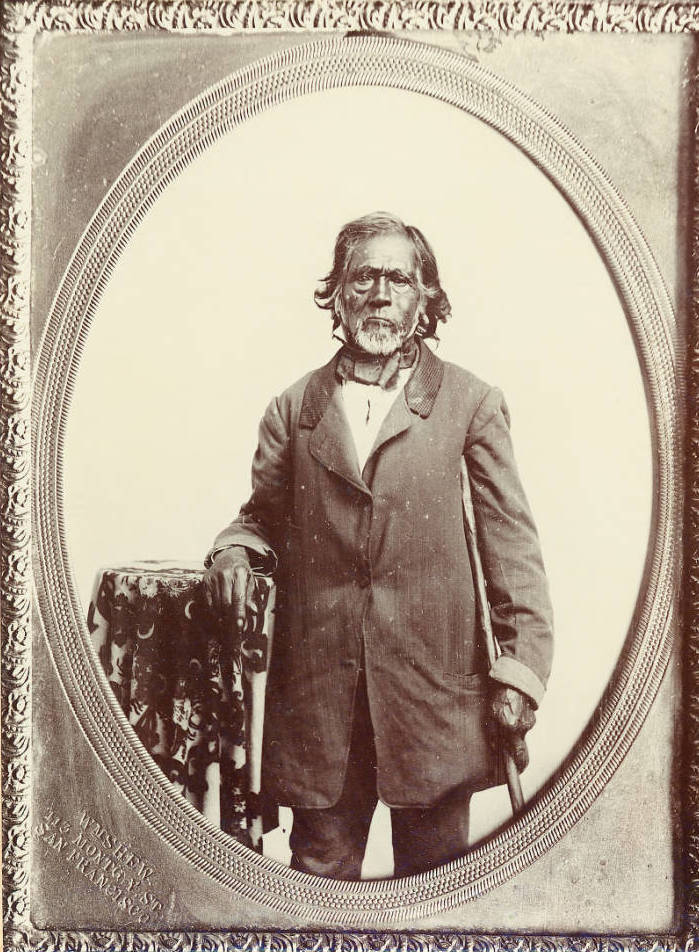
Lupe Yñigo was granted Rancho Posolmi in 1844, covering the northern part of Sunnyvale and Mountain View.

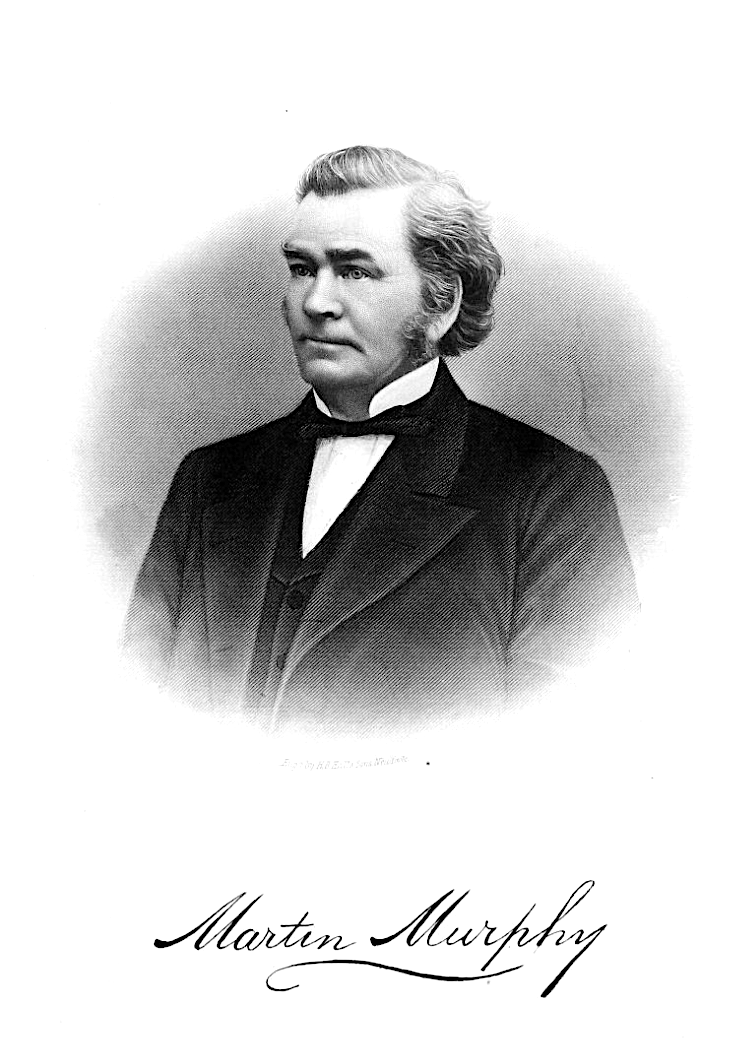
Martin Murphy Jr., an early settler whose land helped establish the City of Sunnyvale

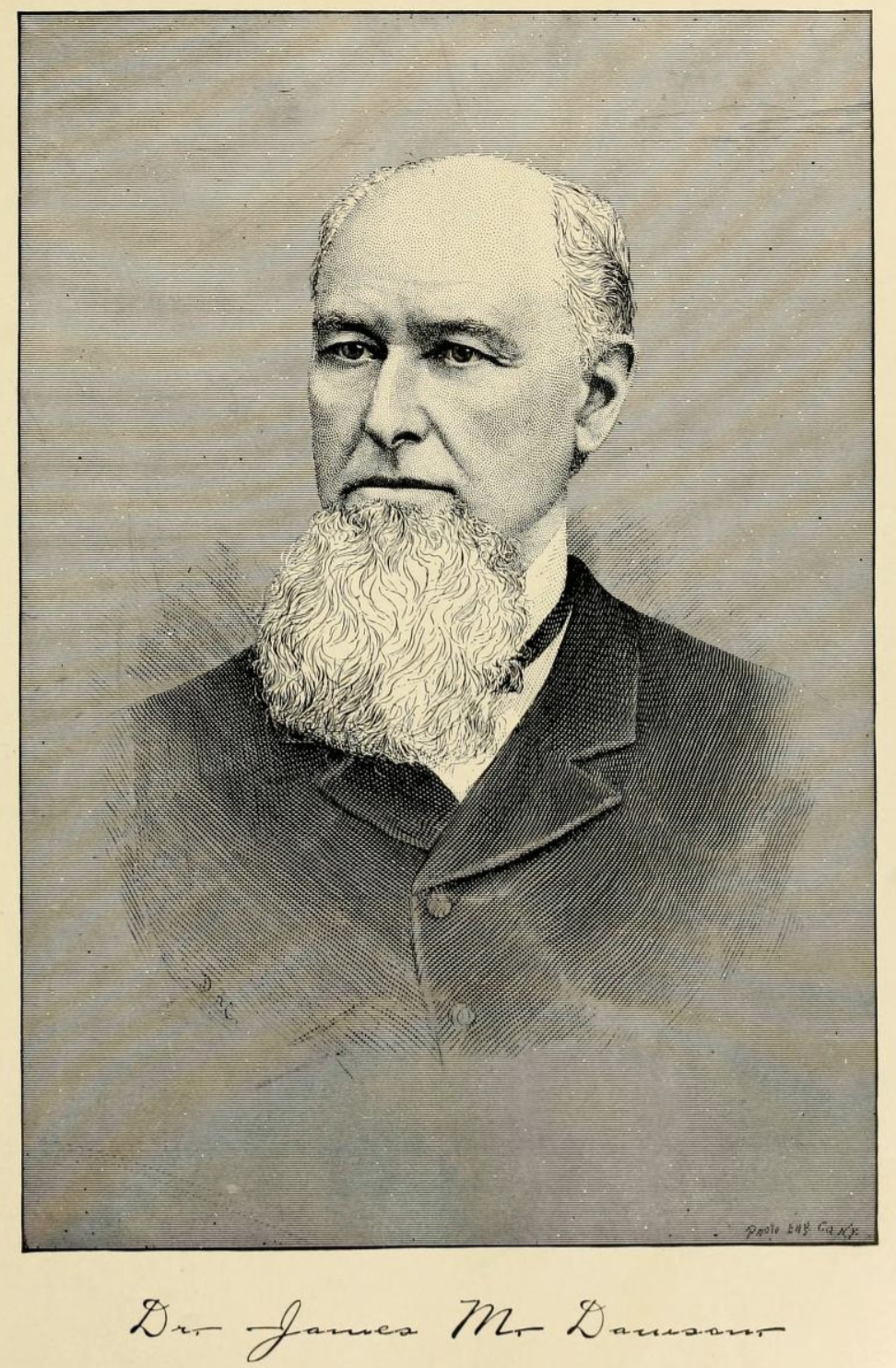
James M. Dawson established the first commercial fruit cannery in the county.

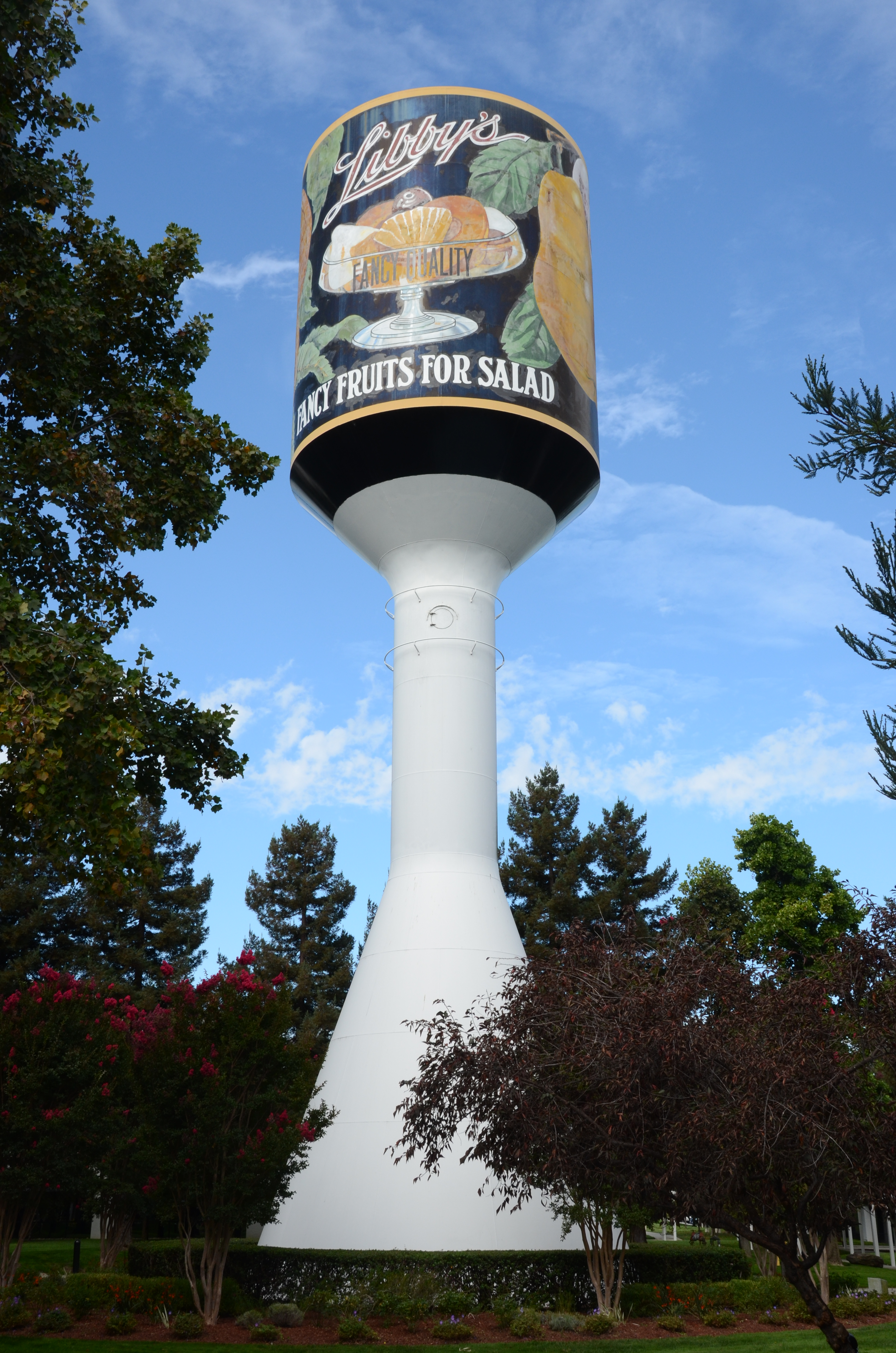
Libby Water Tower, a heritage landmark in Sunnyvale

In 1843, Rancho Pastoria de las Borregas was granted to Francisco Estrada and his wife, Inez Castro. Portions of the land given in this grant later developed into the cities of Mountain View and Sunnyvale. In 1844, a land grant was provided to Lupe Yñigo, one of the few Native Americans to hold land grants. It was first called Rancho Posolmi, in honor of a village of the Ohlone that once stood in the area.

Martin Murphy Jr. came to California with the Murphy family as part of the Stephens–Townsend–Murphy Party in 1844. In 1850, he bought 4,894 acres (19,810,000 m^{2}) of Rancho Pastoria de las Borregas for $12,500. Murphy established a wheat farm and ranch named Bay View. He had the first wood-frame house in Santa Clara County; it was shipped from New England. In 1861, Murphy allowed the San Francisco and San Jose Rail Road to lay tracks on Bay View and establish Murphy's Station. Lawrence's Station was later established on the southern edge of Bay View. When Murphy died in 1884, the land was divided among his heirs. Parcels of the land were sold starting in 1900 to real estate developer Walter Crossman. The Bay View House was demolished in 1961, but was reconstructed in 2008 as the Sunnyvale Heritage Park Museum.

In the 1870s, small fruit orchards replaced many large wheat farms, because wheat farming turned uneconomical due to county and property tax laws, imports and soil degradation. In 1871, James M. Dawson and his wife, Eloise (née Jones), established the first commercial fruit cannery in the county. Fruit agriculture for canning soon became a major industry in the county. The invention of the refrigerated rail car further increased the viability of an economy based upon fruit. The fruit orchards became so prevalent that in 1886, the San Jose Board of Trade called Santa Clara County the "Garden of the World".

In the 1880s, Chinese workers made up roughly a third of the farm labor in Santa Clara County. This proportion declined after the Chinese Exclusion Act was passed. In the 1890s, many immigrants from Italy, the Azores, Portugal, and Japan arrived to work in the orchards.

In 1897, Crossman bought 200 acres (810,000 m^{2}) of orchard land from Patrick Murphy to organize and develop the town, which he named Encinal. He advertised the area as "Beautiful Murphy" and later, in the 1900s, as "the City of Destiny".

In February 1899, Encina School District was established. The town's first schoolhouse, Encina School, was constructed at a cost of $4,000 and opened in September 1899. Previously, the closest school had been in Mountain View.

=== 1900s ===
To avoid confusion with Encinal, Alameda County, Sunnyvale adopted its current name on March 24, 1901. The name was chosen to attract new residents from foggy areas near San Francisco.

Sunnyvale continued to grow and in 1904, dried fruit production began. Two years later, Libby, McNeill & Libby, a Chicago meat-packing company, decided to open its first fruit-packing factory in Sunnyvale. Today, a water tower painted to resemble the first Libby's fruit cocktail can label identifies the former site of the factory.

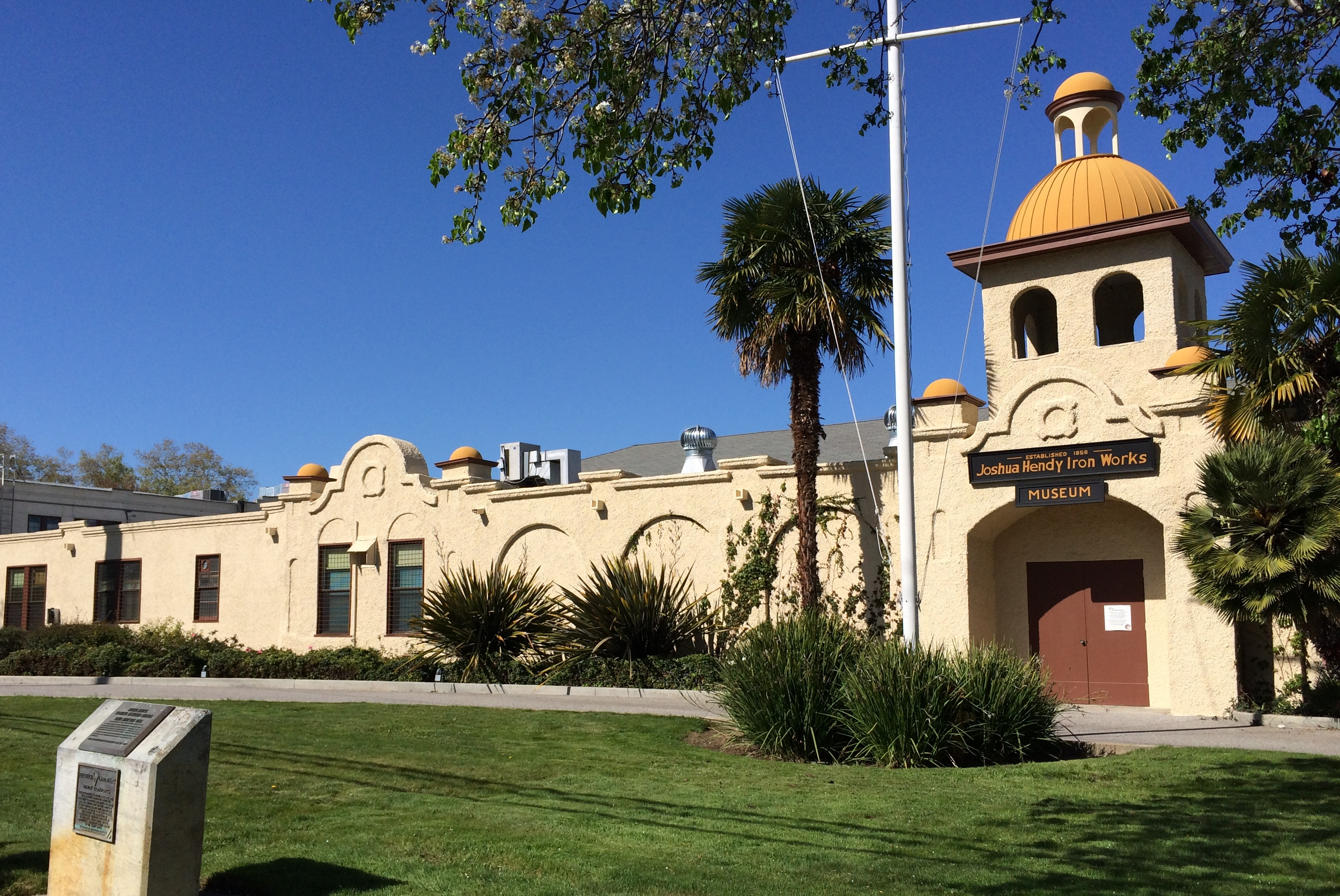
Joshua Hendy Iron Works Museum

Also in 1906, the Joshua Hendy Iron Works relocated from San Francisco to Sunnyvale after the company's building was destroyed by fire after the 1906 earthquake. The ironworks was the first non-agricultural industry in the town. The company later switched from producing mining equipment to other products such as marine steam engines.

In 1912, the residents of Sunnyvale voted to incorporate and Sunnyvale became an official city.

Fremont High School first opened in 1923.

In 1924, Edwina Benner was elected to her first term as mayor of Sunnyvale. She was the second female mayor in California history.

In 1930, Congress decided to place the West Coast dirigible base in Sunnyvale after "buying" the 1,000-acre (4.0 km^{2}) parcel of farmland bordering the San Francisco Bay from the city for $1.

This naval airfield was later renamed Naval Air Station Moffett and then Moffett Federal Airfield and is commonly called Moffett Field.

In 1939, the National Advisory Committee for Aeronautics (NACA, the forerunner of NASA) began research at Ames Laboratory.

During World War II, the war economy began a change from the fruit industry to the high-tech industry in Santa Clara County. The Joshua Hendy Iron Works built marine steam engines, naval guns and rocket launchers to aid in the war effort. As the defense industry grew, a shortage of workers in the farm industry was created. Immigrants from Mexico came to Sunnyvale to fill this void of workers.

After the war, the fruit orchards and sweetcorn farms were cleared to build homes, factories, and offices.

In 1950, the volunteer fire department and the paid police department were combined into the department of public safety.

In 1956, the aircraft manufacturer Lockheed moved its headquarters to Sunnyvale.

Since then, numerous high-tech companies have established offices and headquarters in Sunnyvale, including Advanced Micro Devices and Yahoo.

The first prototype of Atari's coin-operated Pong, the first successful video game, was installed in Sunnyvale in August 1972, in a bar named Andy Capp's Tavern, now Rooster T. Feathers. Atari's headquarters were at 1196 Borregas Avenue in north Sunnyvale.

In 1979, an indoor mall called Sunnyvale Town Center opened in what used to be a traditional downtown shopping district. After years of successful operation, the mall started to decline in the 1990s. After numerous changes in plans and ownership, the mall was demolished in 2007.

=== 2000s ===
By 2002, the few remaining orchards had been replaced with homes and shops. There are still city-owned orchards, such as the Heritage Orchard next to the Sunnyvale Community Center.

Sunnyvale celebrated its 100th anniversary on August 25, 2012.

According to the Bay Area Census, there was a total population of 130,885 in households and 875 in group quarters in 2000.

==== Downtown development ====
In November 2009, previously closed portions of downtown Sunnyvale's streets reopened as part of the ongoing downtown redevelopment of the Sunnyvale Town Center mall, marking the first time in over three decades that those blocks had been open to vehicle and pedestrian traffic. Part of the project involved building new apartment buildings, but the property was repossessed by Wells Fargo in 2009; the developer countersued, leaving the project in legal limbo through 2015.

The two office buildings are now fully occupied by Uber. Mixed-use developments have been built at the former Town and Country location near the Plaza del Sol just north of Murphy Avenue. By mid 2015, new multistory apartment complexes had opened, including a number of ground-floor businesses, and the lawsuit against Wells Fargo was resolved in the bank's favor. The development was sold to Sares Regis in late 2016. Redwood Square reopened as a park in 2017. Many apartments are occupied, and more are being completed in 2020. A Whole Foods Market and AMC Theatres multiplex opened in October 2020.

==== Major businesses ====
In the 2010s, Sunnyvale became home to operations from numerous major technology companies, including Apple, LinkedIn (now headquartered in Sunnyvale), Google, Amazon, Meta, Walmart Labs, and 23andMe.

Google announced major development plans in the Moffett Park area in 2017 adjacent to Moffett Field, with these offices ultimately opening in 2022. Amazon and Meta began leasing buildings in Sunnyvale in 2017 and 2021, respectively.

== Geography ==
Sunnyvale is located at 37°22′7.56″N 122°2′13.4″W.

According to the United States Census Bureau, the city has an area of 22.7 sq mi (58.8 km^{2}), of which 22.0 sq mi (56.9 km^{2}) is land and 0.69 sq mi (1.8 km^{2}) (3.09%) is water. Its elevation is 130 feet above sea level.

=== Climate ===
Like most of the San Francisco Bay Area, Sunnyvale has a warm-summer Mediterranean climate (Köppen Csb), with short, cool, wet winters and long, warm, very dry summers. Average daytime summer temperatures are in the high 70s or low 80s, and during the winter, average daytime high temperatures rarely stay below 50 °F (10 °C). Snowfall is rare, but on January 21, 1962, and February 5, 1976, measurable snowfall occurred in Sunnyvale and most of the San Francisco Bay Area. Sunnyvale was briefly hit by tornadoes in 1951 and 1998, but they are extremely rare.

Climate data for Sunnyvale, California
Month	Jan	Feb	Mar	Apr	May	Jun	Jul	Aug	Sep	Oct	Nov	Dec	Year
Record high °F (°C)	75 (24)	84 (29)	85 (29)	94 (34)	100 (38)	107 (42)	105 (41)	101 (38)	105 (41)	100 (38)	89 (32)	75 (24)	107 (42)
Mean daily maximum °F (°C)	59 (15)	62.2 (16.8)	65.6 (18.7)	70 (21)	74.3 (23.5)	78.8 (26.0)	80.7 (27.1)	80.8 (27.1)	80.1 (26.7)	74.3 (23.5)	64.7 (18.2)	58.6 (14.8)	70.8 (21.5)
Mean daily minimum °F (°C)	41.1 (5.1)	43.5 (6.4)	45.4 (7.4)	47.1 (8.4)	50.7 (10.4)	54.1 (12.3)	56.5 (13.6)	56.4 (13.6)	55 (13)	50.8 (10.4)	44.8 (7.1)	41 (5)	48.9 (9.4)
Record low °F (°C)	21 (−6)	24 (−4)	22 (−6)	31 (−1)	33 (1)	40 (4)	41 (5)	44 (7)	41 (5)	34 (1)	15 (−9)	20 (−7)	15 (−9)
Average precipitation inches (mm)	3.30 (84)	3.56 (90)	2.57 (65)	1.15 (29)	0.52 (13)	0.12 (3.0)	0.02 (0.51)	0.04 (1.0)	0.21 (5.3)	0.90 (23)	2.03 (52)	3.10 (79)	17.52 (444.81)
Source: Northwest Climate Toolbox

== Demographics ==
Historical population
Census	Pop.	Note	%±
1930	3,094		—
1940	4,373		41.3%
1950	9,829		124.8%
1960	59,898		509.4%
1970	95,976		60.2%
1980	106,618		11.1%
1990	117,229		10.0%
2000	131,760		12.4%
2010	140,081		6.3%
2020	155,805		11.2%
U.S. Decennial Census

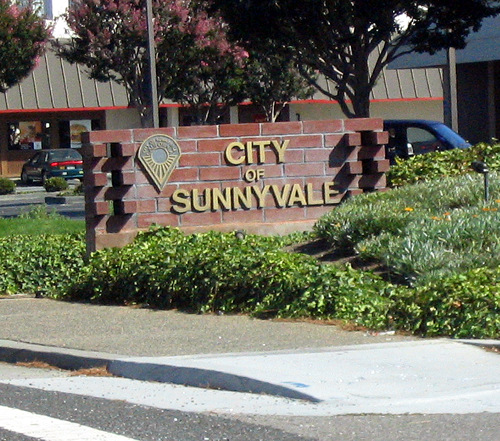
Standard marker at city entrances

The 2020 United States census reported that Sunnyvale had a population of 155,805 and a population density of 7,062.8 inhabitants per square mile (2,727.0/km^{2}). The U.S. Census Bureau estimated Sunnyvale's population at 156,577 in July 2025. As of 2020, the racial makeup of Sunnyvale was 46,551 (29.9%) White, 2,228 (1.4%) African American, 1,081 (0.7%) Native American, 77,842 (49.9%) Asian, 491 (0.3%) Pacific Islander, 14,181 (9.1%) from other races, and 13,431 (8.6%) from two or more races. Hispanic or Latino people of any race were 25,372 persons (16.3%). Non-Hispanic Whites were 27.8% of the population in 2020, compared to 74.7% in 1980.

There were 59,567 households, out of which 16,133 (27%) had children under the age of 18 living in them, 31,557 (53.0%) were married opposite-sex couples living together, 4,069 (6.8%) had a female householder with no husband present, 2,908 (4.9%) had a male householder with no wife present. There were 3,382 (5.7%) unmarried opposite-sex partnerships, and 657 (1.1%) same-sex married couples or partnerships. 14,970 households (25.1%) were made up of individuals, and 5.7% had someone living alone who was 65 years of age or older. The average household size was 2.54. There were 38,750 families (65.0% of all households); the average family size was 3.09.

The population was spread out, with 32,453 people (20.8%) under the age of 18, 9,641 people (6.2%) aged 18 to 24, 57,977 people (37.2%) aged 25 to 44, 34,330 people (22.0%) aged 45 to 64, and 20,683 people (13.2%) who were 65 years of age or older. The median age was 35.2 years. For every 100 females, there were 109.3 males.

There were 63,065 housing units, of which 45.8% were owner-occupied, and 54.2% were occupied by renters. The homeowner vacancy rate was 1.1%; the rental vacancy rate was 5.3%. 72,485 people (46.5% of the population) lived in owner-occupied housing units and 80,220 people (51.5%) lived in rental housing units.

=== Racial and ethnic composition ===
Sunnyvale, California – racial and ethnic composition Note: the US Census treats Hispanic/Latino as an ethnic category. This table excludes Latinos from the racial categories and assigns them to a separate category. Hispanics/Latinos may be of any race.
Race / ethnicity (NH = Non-Hispanic)	Pop. 2000	Pop. 2010	Pop. 2020	% 2000	% 2010	% 2020
White alone (NH)	61,221	48,323	43,281	46.46%	34.50%	27.78%
Black or African American alone (NH)	2,790	2,533	2,134	2.12%	1.81%	1.37%
Native American or Alaska Native alone (NH)	362	292	187	0.27%	0.21%	0.12%
Asian alone (NH)	42,296	57,012	77,552	32.10%	40.70%	49.78%
Native Hawaiian or Pacific Islander alone (NH)	393	594	439	0.30%	0.42%	0.28%
Other race alone (NH)	304	381	839	0.23%	0.27%	0.54%
Mixed race or multiracial (NH)	4,004	4,429	6,001	3.04%	3.16%	3.85%
Hispanic or Latino (any race)	20,390	26,517	25,372	15.48%	18.93%	16.28%
Total	131,760	140,081	155,805	100.00%	100.00%	100.00%

== Economy ==
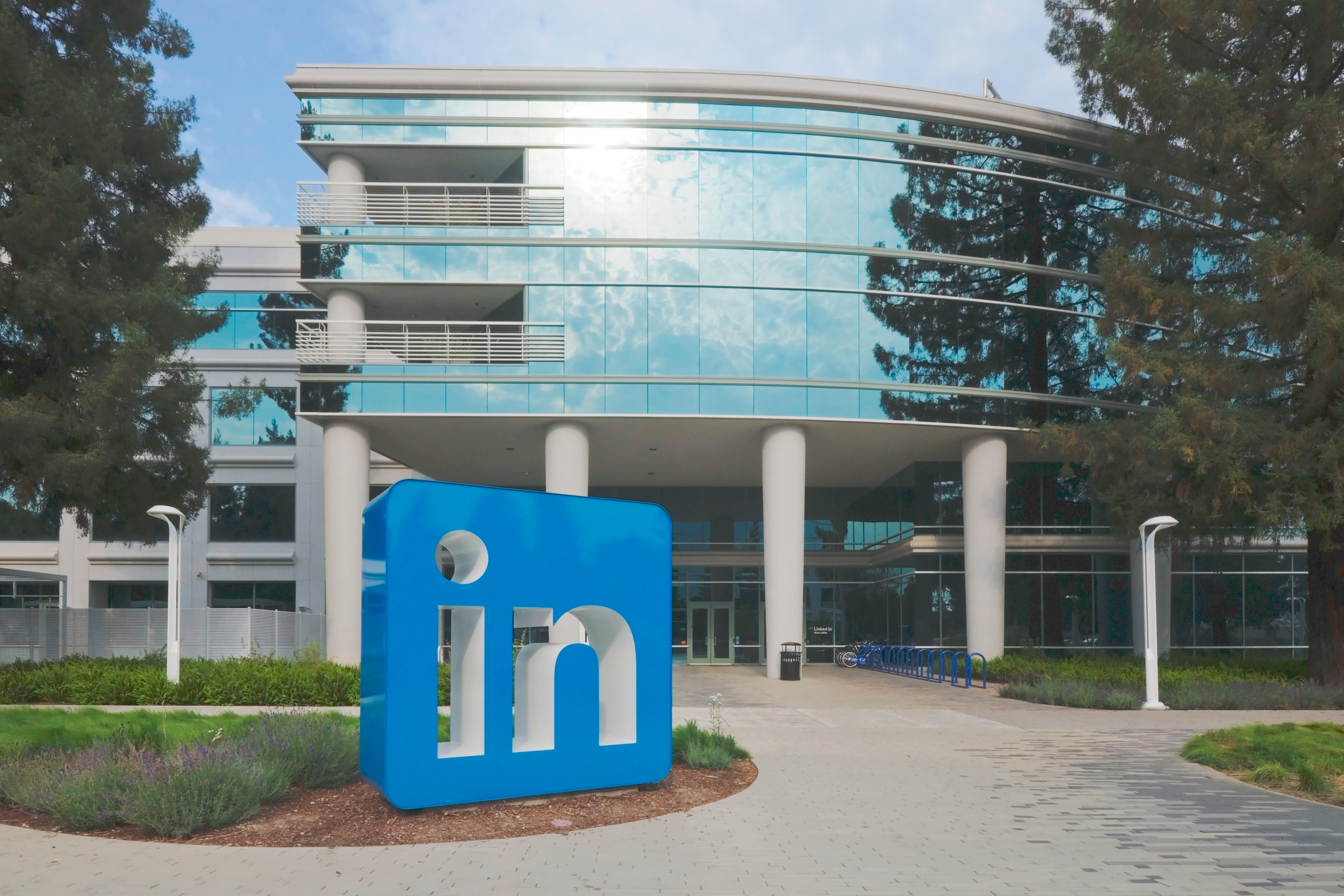
LinkedIn headquarters

Companies based in Sunnyvale include Infinera, Fortinet, Intuitive Surgical, Juniper Networks, LinkedIn, Proofpoint, Inc., Matterport, Inc., and Trimble Inc.

From the 1950s to the 1970s, Sunnyvale had chrysanthemum farms. By 1885, Takanoshin Domoto was growing chrysanthemums and carnations at their small nursery in Oakland. Bay Area Chrysanthemum Growers Association (BACGA) was established in 1956. The 1991 Andean Trade Preference Act "war on drugs" made Colombian, Peruvian, Bolivian, and Ecuadorian flowers tariff-free. Half Moon Bay and Redwood City were also chrysanthemum business locations.

=== Largest employers ===
According to the city's 2025 Annual Comprehensive Financial Report, the top employers in the city are:

#	Employer	# of employees
1	Google	14,426
2	Apple Inc.	12,458
3	Amazon.com Services	6,578
4	Altaba	3,877
5	Intuitive Surgical	3,836
6	Lockheed Martin Space	3,362
7	A2Z Development Center	3,250
8	Walmart	3,232
9	Cepheid	3,042
10	Facebook	3,017

== Government and politics ==
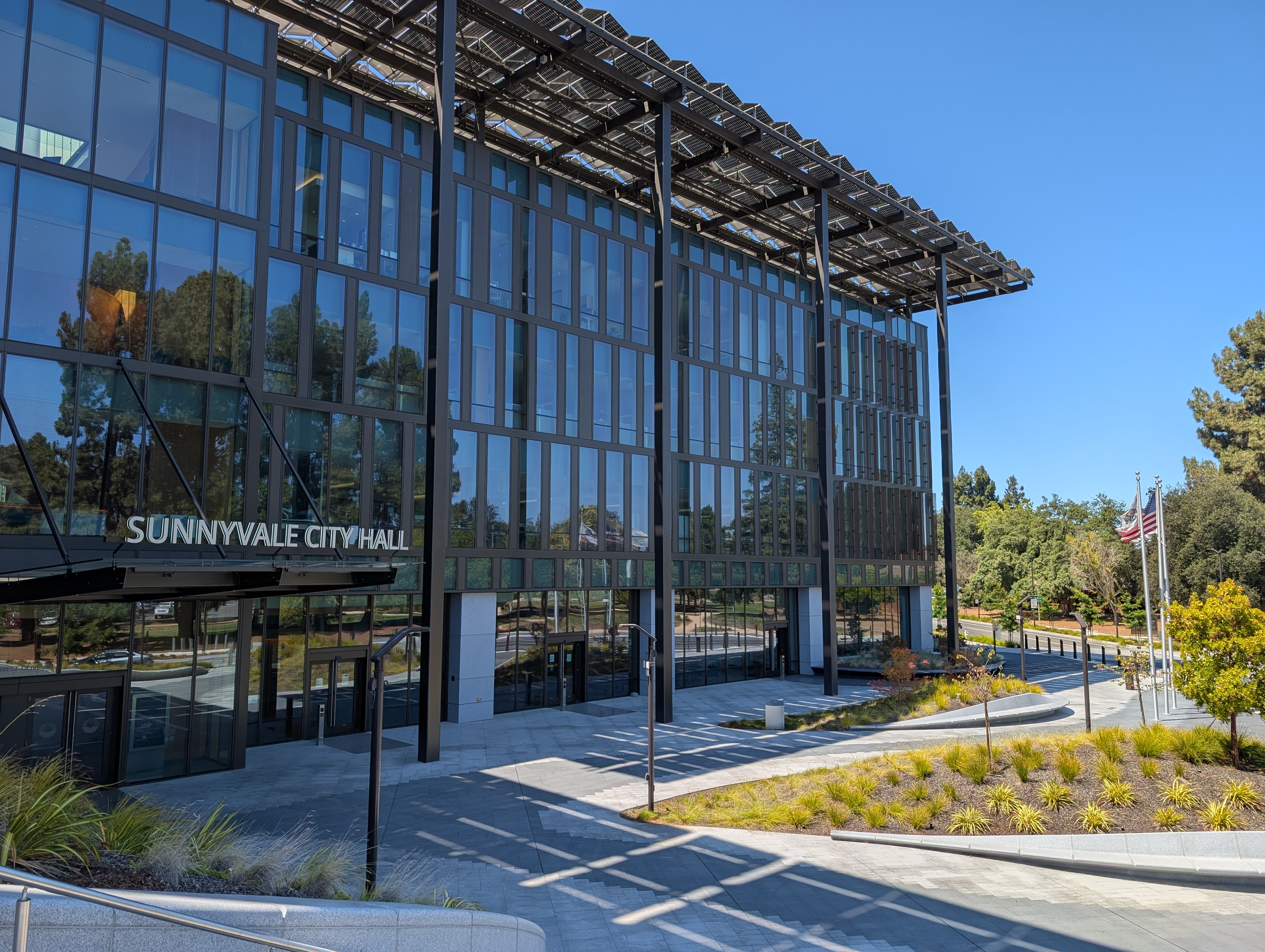
Sunnyvale City Hall, the first city hall in the U.S. to have net-zero emissions and achieve LEED Platinum certification

The City of Sunnyvale uses the council–manager form of government, with a city council consisting of seven members elected to fill individual seats. Starting in November 2020, the mayor is directly elected to a four-year term in a city-wide election. The six council members are elected to four year terms from six districts in even-year elections. The vice-mayor is selected from the six city council members by the mayor and city council, serving a one-year term. The city council hires a city manager to run the day-to-day operations of the city government.

Sunnyvale is the largest city in the United States that uses a consolidated department of public safety, with sworn officers who are fully cross-trained to perform police, firefighting, and emergency medical services. Officer assignments are rotated annually, with some specialist assignments lasting up to five years. Sunnyvale has had a consolidated DPS since 1950.

In the California State Legislature, Sunnyvale is in the 10th senatorial district, seat currently vacant, and in the 26th Assembly district, represented by Democrat Patrick Ahrens.

In the United States House of Representatives, Sunnyvale is in California's 17th congressional district, represented by Democrat Ro Khanna.

Registered voters in Sunnyvale
Date	# of registered voters
August 16, 2016	56,030
June 5, 2018	58,542
November 6, 2018	61,144

== Education ==
For elementary and middle schools, most of the city is in the Sunnyvale School District, while some parts are in the Cupertino Union School District, the Santa Clara Unified School District, and the Mountain View Whisman Elementary School District.

For high schools, most of the city is in the Fremont Union High School District (the parts that are part of the Sunnyvale School District or Cupertino Union School District for primary schools), and those areas of Sunnyvale are divided between Fremont High School and Homestead High School. Some parts of the city are in the Santa Clara Unified School District, feeding mostly into Wilcox High School.

French American School of Silicon Valley (FASSV, French: École franco-américaine de la Silicon Valley) is a private elementary school in Sunnyvale, which opened in 1992. It is recognized as a French international school by the AEFE.

Nimitz Elementary is a private, English as a Second Language (ESL) elementary school in Sunnyvale.

Library services for the city are provided by the Sunnyvale Public Library, at the Sunnyvale Civic Center.

Schools in Sunnyvale School District
Elementary schools	Middle schools
Ellis Elementary	Columbia Middle
Vargas Elementary	Sunnyvale Middle
Cherry Chase Elementary
Bishop Elementary
San Miguel Elementary
Fairwood Elementary
Lakewood Elementary
Cumberland Elementary

Schools applicable to Sunnyvale residents
Elementary schools	Middle schools	High schools	District abbreviation
Pomeroy Elementary	Peterson Middle School	Adrian Wilcox High School	SCUSD (Santa Clara)
Laurelwood Elementary	Peterson Middle School	Adrian Wilcox High School	SCUSD (Santa Clara)
Millikin Elementary	Peterson Middle School	Adrian Wilcox High School	SCUSD (Santa Clara)
Ponderosa Elementary	Peterson Middle School	Adrian Wilcox High School	SCUSD (Santa Clara)
Braly Elementary	Peterson Middle School	Adrian Wilcox High School	SCUSD (Santa Clara)
Nimitz Elementary	Cupertino Middle School	Fremont High School	CUSD (Cupertino) + FUHSD
Stocklmeir Elementary	Cupertino Middle School	Fremont High School	CUSD (Cupertino) + FUHSD
West Valley Elementary	Cupertino Middle School	Fremont High School	CUSD (Cupertino) + FUHSD

=== Private schools ===
- Challenger School
- French American School of Silicon Valley
- Helios School
- Rainbow Montessori
- Resurrection School (religious)
- Silicon Valley Academy (religious)
- South Peninsula Hebrew Day School (religious)
- Stratford School
- Sunnyvale Christian School (religious)
- The King's Academy (religious)

== Neighborhoods ==
The southern half of Sunnyvale is predominantly residential, while most of Sunnyvale north of Highway 237 is zoned for industrial use.

Within the southern half are several neighborhoods that have many Eichler homes. More specifically, there are 16 housing tracts containing over 1,100 Eichler homes.

The far eastern section of El Camino Real in Sunnyvale has a significant concentration of businesses owned by Indian immigrants.

== Parks ==
There are 476 acres of parks in the Sunnyvale area. These include Las Palmas Park, Ortega Park, Seven Seas Park, Fair Oaks Park, Raynor Park, Washington Park near downtown, two public golf courses, and Baylands Park, site of the annual Linux Picnic.

Charles Street Gardens, Sunnyvale's oldest and largest community garden, is adjacent to Sunnyvale's Public Library. In 2017 the Santa Clara Unified School District took over operation of Full Circle Farm Sunnyvale, which leased the land from the district. It plans to focus the farm on education.

== Transportation ==
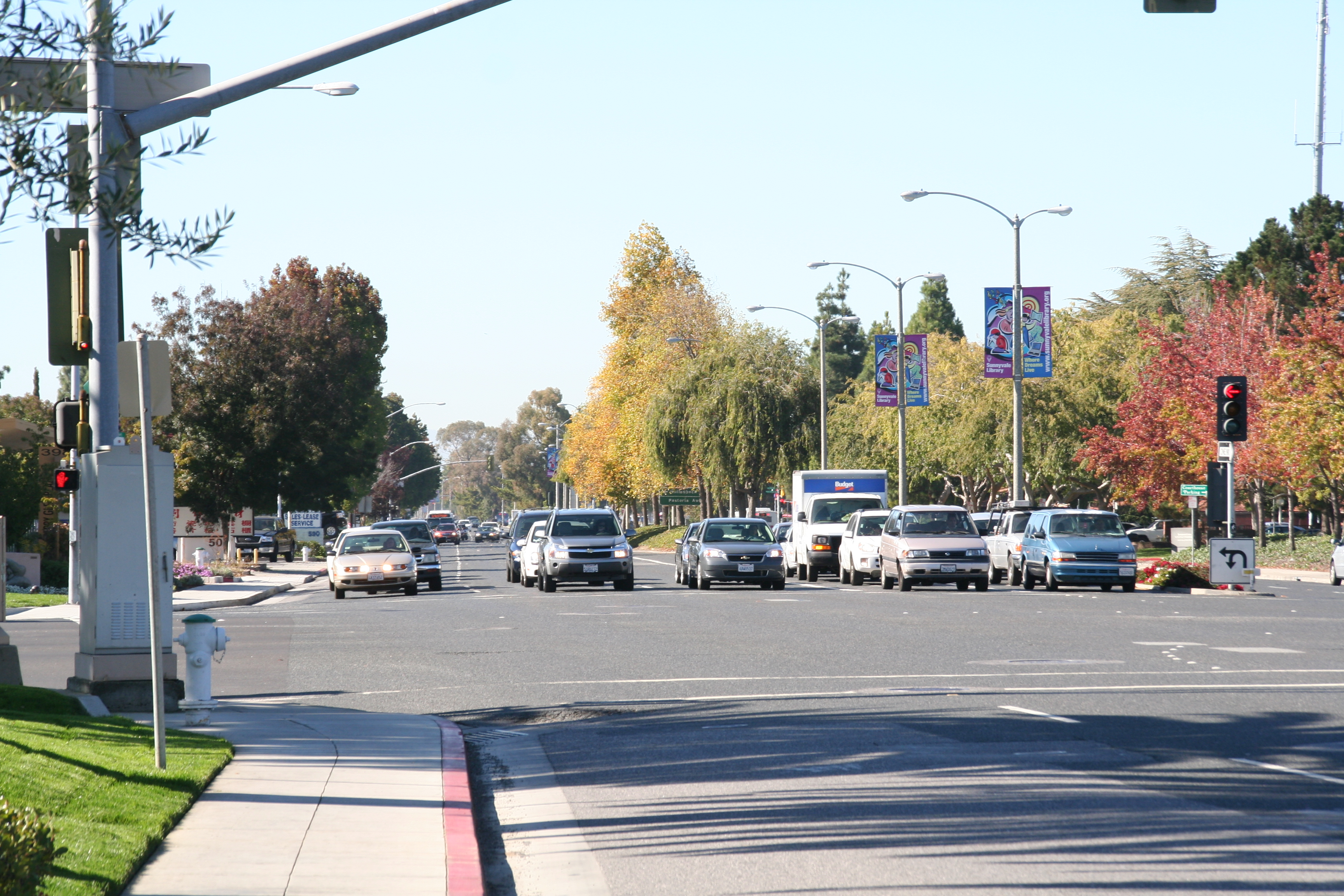
Route 82 at the intersection with Mathilda Avenue

Several major roads and freeways go through Sunnyvale:

- Interstate 280 (Junipero Serra Freeway)
- U.S. Route 101
- State Route 82 (El Camino Real)
- State Route 85 (Stevens Creek Freeway)
- State Route 237 (Southbay Freeway)

=== Public transportation ===
Sunnyvale is served by Santa Clara Valley Transportation Authority (light rail and buses) and by Caltrain commuter rail. Two Caltrain stations are in Sunnyvale: the Sunnyvale station in the Heritage District downtown, and the Lawrence station in eastern Sunnyvale, north of the Ponderosa neighborhood.

=== Bicycle ===
Sunnyvale has been listed by the League of American Bicyclists as a bronze-level Bicycle Friendly Community.

The Bicycle and Pedestrian Advisory Committee advises the city council on the continued development of the bicycle plan for the city.

=== Airports ===
For commercial passenger air travel, Sunnyvale is served by three nearby international airports:

- Norman Y. Mineta San Jose International Airport (SJC), 9.5 miles from downtown Sunnyvale by car. It is also accessible by Caltrain, VTA light rail, and VTA bus. Caltrain and light rail stations require a transfer to a free shuttle bus to get to the airport terminal.
- San Francisco International Airport (SFO), 27.7 miles by car. SFO is transit accessible from Sunnyvale via Caltrain and Bay Area Rapid Transit (BART).
- Metropolitan Oakland International Airport (OAK), 37.5 miles by car. Access to Oakland airport by public transit is possible via multiple transfers.

== Crime ==
Sunnyvale has consistently ranked as one of the safest ten cities (for cities of similar size) in the United States according to the FBI's crime reports. From 1966 to at least 2004, Sunnyvale never placed below fifth in safety rankings among U.S. cities in its population class. In 2005, Sunnyvale ranked as the 18th-safest city overall in the U.S., according to the Morgan Quitno Awards. In 2009, Sunnyvale was ranked 7th in U.S. by Forbes Magazine in an analysis of America's safest cities. In 2018, Sunnyvale was named the safest city by SmartAsset.com for the third year in a row.

=== Gangs ===
According to Sunnyvale's Department of Public Safety, confirmed gang members make up less than one percent of the population, although 95% of the crime is gang on gang violence. Sunnyvale's Gang Task-force agency as well as the FBI note three main gangs that exist in Sunnyvale, thrice allying to either Sureño or Norteño families, one existing since the 1960s.

=== Mass shooting ===
On February 16, 1988, Richard Farley shot 11 people, killing seven of them, at his former employer ESL Incorporated in north Sunnyvale, across Borregas Avenue from Atari. The 1993 made-for-television film I Can Make You Love Me starring Brooke Shields and Richard Thomas was based on the event.

== Folklore ==
A long-standing legend of Sunnyvale is of a ghost that haunts the town's Toys 'R' Us store (now REI). A purported psychic, Sylvia Browne, claimed to have made contact with the ghost on the 1980 TV show That's Incredible! and named him Johnny Johnson. This story was also explored in a 1991 episode of Haunted Lives: True Ghost Stories. Browne said he had been a Swedish preacher who worked as a farmhand in the orchard where the toy store now stands and that he bled to death from an accidental, self-inflicted axe injury to his leg.

== Notable people ==
- Michael Amick, soccer player
- Tony Anselmo, animator and voice of Donald Duck
- Antwon, hip-hop artist
- Jeff Baicher, soccer player
- Tully Banta-Cain, professional football player
- Brian Boitano, figure skater
- Benny Brown, runner
- Timothy Linh Bui, filmmaker
- Tony Bui, film director
- Juju Chang, television personality
- Arthur Davis, animator and director
- Sean Dawkins, NFL player, lived in Sunnyvale while attending Homestead High School in Cupertino
- Penny Dean, swimmer and coach
- Andrew David Edwards, serial killer
- Richard Farley, mass murderer
- Andrew Fire, 2006 Nobel laureate in medicine
- Martin Ford, entrepreneur, author
- Jeff Goodell, writer
- Bill Green, former U.S. and NCAA record holder in track and field, 5th place in the hammer throw at the 1984 Olympic Games
- Teri Hatcher, actress
- Robert Hawkins, artist and painter
- Steve Jobs, co-founder of Apple Inc.
- Imran Khan, Bollywood actor
- Steve Kloves, screenwriter, film director and producer
- Francie Larrieu-Smith, track and field athlete
- Diego Luna, soccer player who represented the United States national team
- Brian MacLeod, musician
- Michael S. Malone, author and businessman
- Landon Curt Noll, astronomer, cryptographer and mathematician
- The Orange Peels, musical group
- Chris Pelekoudas, Major League Baseball umpire, lived and died in Sunnyvale
- Lee Pelekoudas, Seattle Mariners interim general manager, raised in Sunnyvale
- Joe Prunty, NBA assistant coach for the Atlanta Hawks
- Mark Rober, NASA JPL employee 2004–2011, current scientific YouTuber
- Amy Tan, novelist
- Troy Tulowitzki, Major League Baseball player, graduated from Fremont High School
- Peter Ueberroth, Major League Baseball Commissioner 1984–89
- Steve Wozniak, co-founder of Apple Inc.

== Twin towns – sister cities ==
Until 1970, Sunnyvale had a sister city relationship with Chillán, Chile. In 2013, the city entered into a three-year Friendly Exchange Relations Agreement with Iizuka, Japan; in 2016, the city council voted to change this to a sister city relationship.

== See also ==
- List of cities and towns in the San Francisco Bay Area
- Category: People from Sunnyvale, California
