= List of cities and towns in the San Francisco Bay Area =

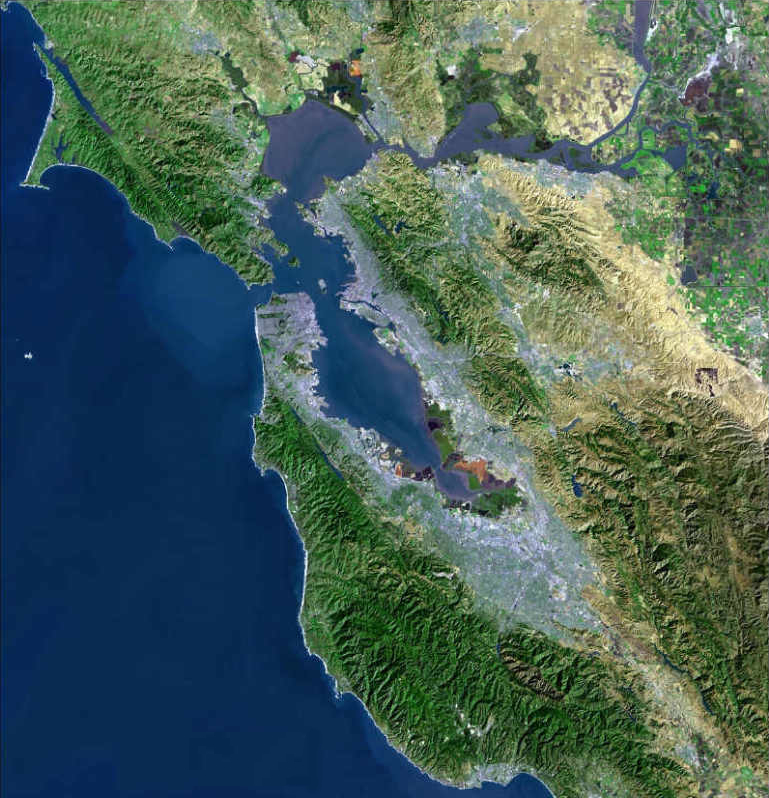
San Francisco Bay Area

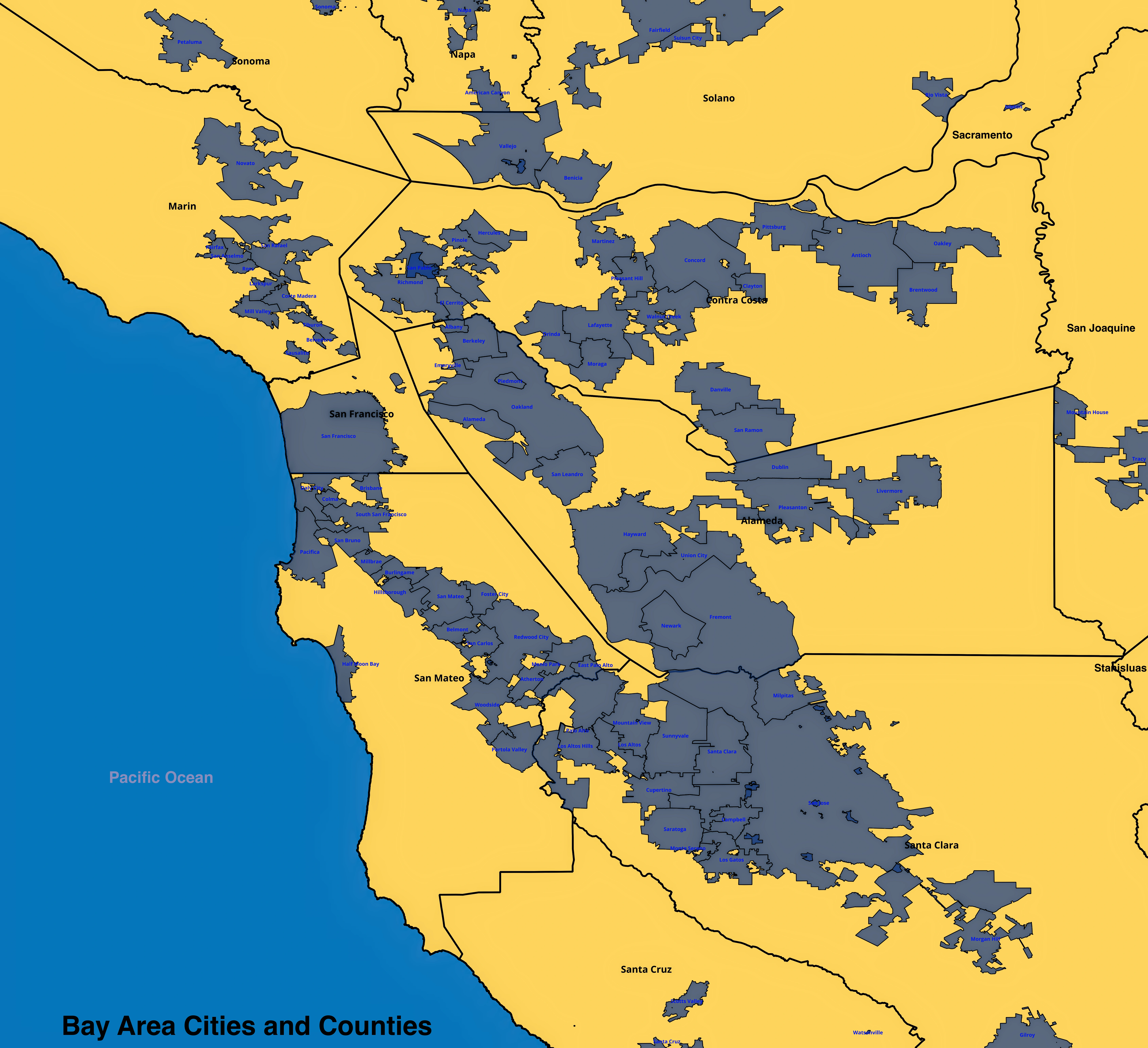
Bay Area cities and counties

The San Francisco Bay Area, commonly known as the Bay Area, is a metropolitan region surrounding the San Francisco Bay estuaries in Northern California. According to the 2010 United States census, the region has over 7.1 million inhabitants and approximately 6,900 square miles (18,000 km^{2}) of land. The region is home to three major cities: Oakland, San Francisco, and, the largest by area and population, San Jose.

The Bay Area has been inhabited since antiquity, first by the Ohlone and Miwok peoples, followed by the Spanish, who first arrived in 1769 and established the area's first mission, Mission San Francisco de Asís, in 1776. After being ceded to the United States in 1848, the Bay Area grew immensely due to the California gold rush, establishing itself as one of the most important regions on the West Coast. Today, the Bay Area is the home of Silicon Valley, Wine Country, and numerous companies, universities, bridges, airports, and parks.

The Bay Area consists of nine counties (Alameda, Contra Costa, Marin, Napa, San Francisco, San Mateo, Santa Clara, Solano, and Sonoma) and 101 municipalities. One, San Francisco, is a consolidated city-county. California law makes no distinction between "city" and "town", and municipalities may use either term in their official names. The first municipalities to incorporate were Benicia and San Jose on March 27, 1850, while the most recent was Oakley on July 1, 1999. The largest municipality by population and land area is San Jose with 1,013,240 residents and 178.26 square miles (461.7 km^{2}). The smallest by population is Colma with 1,507 people, while the smallest by land area is Belvedere at 0.52 square miles (1.3 km^{2}).

== Cities ==
| † | County seat |

| Name | Type | County | Population (2020) | Land area | | Density (2020) | Incorporated |
| Name | Type | County | Population (2020) | sq mi | km^{2} | Density (2020) | Incorporated |
|---|---|---|---|---|---|---|---|
| Alameda | City | Alameda | 78,280 | 10.45 | 27.1 | 7,491/sq mi (2,892.3/km^{2}) | April 19, 1854 |
| Albany | City | Alameda | 20,271 | 1.79 | 4.6 | 11,320/sq mi (4,372/km^{2}) | September 22, 1908 |
| American Canyon | City | Napa | 21,837 | 6.09 | 15.8 | 3,585.7/sq mi (1,384.5/km^{2}) | January 1, 1992 |
| Antioch | City | Contra Costa | 115,291 | 29.17 | 75.5 | 3,952.4/sq mi (1,526.02/km^{2}) | February 6, 1872 |
| Atherton | Town | San Mateo | 7,188 | 5.02 | 13.0 | 1,431.9/sq mi (552.8/km^{2}) | September 12, 1923 |
| Belmont | City | San Mateo | 28,335 | 4.63 | 12.0 | 6,120/sq mi (2,362.9/km^{2}) | October 29, 1926 |
| Belvedere | City | Marin | 2,126 | 0.52 | 1.3 | 4,090/sq mi (1,579/km^{2}) | December 24, 1896 |
| Benicia | City | Solano | 27,131 | 12.81 | 33.2 | 2,118.0/sq mi (817.7/km^{2}) | March 27, 1850 |
| Berkeley | City | Alameda | 124,321 | 10.43 | 27.0 | 11,920/sq mi (4,602.2/km^{2}) | April 4, 1878 |
| Brentwood | City | Contra Costa | 64,292 | 14.87 | 38.5 | 4,323.6/sq mi (1,669.4/km^{2}) | January 21, 1948 |
| Brisbane | City | San Mateo | 4,851 | 2.99 | 7.7 | 1,622.4/sq mi (626.4/km^{2}) | November 27, 1961 |
| Burlingame | City | San Mateo | 31,386 | 4.39 | 11.4 | 7,149/sq mi (2,760/km^{2}) | June 6, 1908 |
| Calistoga | City | Napa | 5,228 | 2.58 | 6.7 | 2,026/sq mi (782.4/km^{2}) | January 6, 1886 |
| Campbell | City | Santa Clara | 43,959 | 6.08 | 15.7 | 7,230/sq mi (2,791.6/km^{2}) | March 28, 1952 |
| Clayton | City | Contra Costa | 11,070 | 3.84 | 9.9 | 2,883/sq mi (1,113.1/km^{2}) | March 18, 1964 |
| Cloverdale | City | Sonoma | 8,996 | 3.14 | 8.1 | 2,865/sq mi (1,106.2/km^{2}) | February 28, 1872 |
| Colma | Town | San Mateo | 1,507 | 1.89 | 4.9 | 797.4/sq mi (307.9/km^{2}) | August 5, 1924 |
| Concord | City | Contra Costa | 125,410 | 30.55 | 79.1 | 4,105.1/sq mi (1,585.0/km^{2}) | February 9, 1905 |
| Corte Madera | Town | Marin | 10,222 | 3.16 | 8.2 | 3,235/sq mi (1,249.0/km^{2}) | June 10, 1916 |
| Cotati | City | Sonoma | 7,584 | 1.87 | 4.8 | 4,056/sq mi (1,566/km^{2}) | July 16, 1963 |
| Cupertino | City | Santa Clara | 60,381 | 11.33 | 29.3 | 5,329.3/sq mi (2,057.7/km^{2}) | October 10, 1955 |
| Daly City | City | San Mateo | 104,901 | 7.64 | 19.8 | 13,730/sq mi (5,301/km^{2}) | March 22, 1911 |
| Danville | Town | Contra Costa | 43,582 | 18.08 | 46.8 | 2,410.5/sq mi (930.70/km^{2}) | July 1, 1982 |
| Dixon | City | Solano | 18,988 | 7.10 | 18.4 | 2,674.4/sq mi (1,032.6/km^{2}) | March 30, 1878 |
| Dublin | City | Alameda | 72,589 | 15.23 | 39.4 | 4,766.2/sq mi (1,840.2/km^{2}) | February 1, 1982 |
| East Palo Alto | City | San Mateo | 30,034 | 2.53 | 6.6 | 11,871/sq mi (4,583/km^{2}) | July 1, 1983 |
| El Cerrito | City | Contra Costa | 25,962 | 3.67 | 9.5 | 7,074/sq mi (2,731/km^{2}) | August 23, 1917 |
| Emeryville | City | Alameda | 12,905 | 1.27 | 3.3 | 10,160/sq mi (3,923/km^{2}) | December 8, 1896 |
| Fairfax | Town | Marin | 7,605 | 2.23 | 5.8 | 3,410/sq mi (1,316.7/km^{2}) | March 2, 1931 |
| Fairfield† | City | Solano | 119,881 | 41.59 | 107.7 | 2,882.4/sq mi (1,112.92/km^{2}) | December 12, 1903 |
| Foster City | City | San Mateo | 33,805 | 3.79 | 9.8 | 8,920/sq mi (3,444/km^{2}) | April 27, 1971 |
| Fremont | City | Alameda | 230,504 | 78.31 | 202.8 | 2,943.48/sq mi (1,136.48/km^{2}) | January 23, 1956 |
| Gilroy | City | Santa Clara | 59,520 | 16.54 | 42.8 | 3,598.5/sq mi (1,389.4/km^{2}) | March 12, 1870 |
| Half Moon Bay | City | San Mateo | 11,795 | 6.24 | 16.2 | 1,890.2/sq mi (729.8/km^{2}) | July 15, 1959 |
| Hayward | City | Alameda | 162,954 | 45.82 | 118.7 | 3,556.4/sq mi (1,373.13/km^{2}) | March 11, 1876 |
| Healdsburg | City | Sonoma | 11,340 | 4.42 | 11.4 | 2,566/sq mi (990.6/km^{2}) | February 20, 1867 |
| Hercules | City | Contra Costa | 26,016 | 6.41 | 16.6 | 4,059/sq mi (1,567.1/km^{2}) | December 15, 1900 |
| Hillsborough | Town | San Mateo | 11,387 | 6.17 | 16.0 | 1,845.5/sq mi (712.6/km^{2}) | May 5, 1910 |
| Lafayette | City | Contra Costa | 25,391 | 15.02 | 38.9 | 1,690.5/sq mi (652.70/km^{2}) | July 29, 1968 |
| Larkspur | City | Marin | 13,064 | 3.00 | 7.8 | 4,355/sq mi (1,681.3/km^{2}) | March 1, 1908 |
| Livermore | City | Alameda | 87,955 | 26.45 | 68.5 | 3,325.3/sq mi (1,283.92/km^{2}) | April 1, 1876 |
| Los Altos | City | Santa Clara | 31,625 | 6.54 | 16.9 | 4,836/sq mi (1,867.0/km^{2}) | December 1, 1952 |
| Los Altos Hills | Town | Santa Clara | 8,489 | 9.03 | 23.4 | 940.1/sq mi (362.97/km^{2}) | January 27, 1956 |
| Los Gatos | Town | Santa Clara | 33,529 | 11.55 | 29.9 | 2,902.9/sq mi (1,120.8/km^{2}) | August 10, 1887 |
| Martinez† | City | Contra Costa | 37,287 | 12.63 | 32.7 | 2,952.3/sq mi (1,139.9/km^{2}) | April 1, 1876 |
| Menlo Park | City | San Mateo | 33,780 | 9.99 | 25.9 | 3,381.4/sq mi (1,305.6/km^{2}) | November 23, 1927 |
| Mill Valley | City | Marin | 14,231 | 4.78 | 12.4 | 2,977/sq mi (1,149.5/km^{2}) | September 1, 1900 |
| Millbrae | City | San Mateo | 23,216 | 3.27 | 8.5 | 7,100/sq mi (2,741/km^{2}) | January 14, 1948 |
| Milpitas | City | Santa Clara | 80,273 | 13.48 | 34.9 | 5,955.0/sq mi (2,299.2/km^{2}) | January 26, 1954 |
| Monte Sereno | City | Santa Clara | 3,479 | 1.63 | 4.2 | 2,134/sq mi (824.1/km^{2}) | May 14, 1957 |
| Moraga | Town | Contra Costa | 16,870 | 9.46 | 24.5 | 1,783.3/sq mi (688.5/km^{2}) | November 13, 1974 |
| Morgan Hill | City | Santa Clara | 45,483 | 12.94 | 33.5 | 3,514.9/sq mi (1,357.1/km^{2}) | November 10, 1906 |
| Mountain View | City | Santa Clara | 82,376 | 11.96 | 31.0 | 6,887.6/sq mi (2,659.3/km^{2}) | November 7, 1902 |
| Napa† | City | Napa | 79,246 | 18.05 | 46.7 | 4,390.4/sq mi (1,695.1/km^{2}) | March 23, 1872 |
| Newark | City | Alameda | 47,529 | 13.92 | 36.1 | 3,414.4/sq mi (1,318.3/km^{2}) | September 22, 1955 |
| Novato | City | Marin | 53,225 | 27.48 | 71.2 | 1,936.9/sq mi (747.83/km^{2}) | January 20, 1960 |
| Oakland† | City | Alameda | 440,646 | 55.93 | 144.9 | 7,878.5/sq mi (3,041.92/km^{2}) | May 4, 1852 |
| Oakley | City | Contra Costa | 43,357 | 15.87 | 41.1 | 2,732.0/sq mi (1,054.8/km^{2}) | July 1, 1999 |
| Orinda | City | Contra Costa | 19,514 | 12.85 | 33.3 | 1,518.6/sq mi (586.33/km^{2}) | July 1, 1985 |
| Pacifica | City | San Mateo | 38,640 | 12.58 | 32.6 | 3,071.5/sq mi (1,185.9/km^{2}) | November 22, 1957 |
| Palo Alto | City | Santa Clara | 68,572 | 24.10 | 62.4 | 2,845.3/sq mi (1,098.58/km^{2}) | April 23, 1894 |
| Petaluma | City | Sonoma | 59,776 | 14.42 | 37.3 | 4,145.4/sq mi (1,600.5/km^{2}) | April 12, 1858 |
| Piedmont | City | Alameda | 11,270 | 1.70 | 4.4 | 6,629/sq mi (2,560/km^{2}) | January 31, 1907 |
| Pinole | City | Contra Costa | 19,022 | 5.10 | 13.2 | 3,730/sq mi (1,440.1/km^{2}) | June 25, 1903 |
| Pittsburg | City | Contra Costa | 76,416 | 17.68 | 45.8 | 4,322.2/sq mi (1,668.8/km^{2}) | June 25, 1903 |
| Pleasant Hill | City | Contra Costa | 34,613 | 7.08 | 18.3 | 4,889/sq mi (1,887.6/km^{2}) | November 14, 1961 |
| Pleasanton | City | Alameda | 79,871 | 24.14 | 62.5 | 3,308.7/sq mi (1,277.48/km^{2}) | June 18, 1894 |
| Portola Valley | Town | San Mateo | 4,456 | 9.08 | 23.5 | 490.7/sq mi (189.48/km^{2}) | July 14, 1964 |
| Redwood City† | City | San Mateo | 84,292 | 19.34 | 50.1 | 4,358.4/sq mi (1,682.8/km^{2}) | May 11, 1867 |
| Richmond | City | Contra Costa | 116,448 | 30.05 | 77.8 | 3,875.1/sq mi (1,496.20/km^{2}) | August 7, 1905 |
| Rio Vista | City | Solano | 10,005 | 6.60 | 17.1 | 1,515.9/sq mi (585.3/km^{2}) | January 6, 1894 |
| Rohnert Park | City | Sonoma | 44,390 | 7.29 | 18.9 | 6,089/sq mi (2,351.0/km^{2}) | August 28, 1962 |
| Ross | Town | Marin | 2,338 | 1.56 | 4.0 | 1,499/sq mi (578.7/km^{2}) | August 21, 1908 |
| St. Helena | City | Napa | 5,430 | 4.96 | 12.8 | 1,094.8/sq mi (422.7/km^{2}) | March 24, 1876 |
| San Anselmo | Town | Marin | 12,830 | 2.68 | 6.9 | 4,787/sq mi (1,848/km^{2}) | April 9, 1907 |
| San Bruno | City | San Mateo | 43,908 | 5.49 | 14.2 | 7,998/sq mi (3,088.0/km^{2}) | December 23, 1914 |
| San Carlos | City | San Mateo | 30,722 | 5.41 | 14.0 | 5,679/sq mi (2,192.6/km^{2}) | July 8, 1925 |
| San Francisco† | City and county | San Francisco | 873,965 | 46.91 | 121.5 | 18,630.7/sq mi (7,193.3/km^{2}) | April 16, 1850 |
| San Jose† | City | Santa Clara | 1,013,240 | 178.26 | 461.7 | 5,684.06/sq mi (2,194.63/km^{2}) | March 27, 1850 |
| San Leandro | City | Alameda | 91,008 | 13.32 | 34.5 | 6,832.4/sq mi (2,638.0/km^{2}) | March 21, 1872 |
| San Mateo | City | San Mateo | 105,661 | 12.13 | 31.4 | 8,711/sq mi (3,363.2/km^{2}) | September 4, 1894 |
| San Pablo | City | Contra Costa | 32,127 | 2.62 | 6.8 | 12,262/sq mi (4,734/km^{2}) | April 27, 1948 |
| San Rafael† | City | Marin | 61,271 | 16.59 | 43.0 | 3,693.2/sq mi (1,426.0/km^{2}) | February 18, 1874 |
| San Ramon | City | Contra Costa | 84,605 | 18.69 | 48.4 | 4,526.8/sq mi (1,747.8/km^{2}) | July 1, 1983 |
| Santa Clara | City | Santa Clara | 127,647 | 18.28 | 47.3 | 6,982.9/sq mi (2,696.1/km^{2}) | July 5, 1852 |
| Santa Rosa† | City | Sonoma | 178,127 | 42.53 | 110.2 | 4,188.3/sq mi (1,617.10/km^{2}) | March 26, 1868 |
| Saratoga | City | Santa Clara | 31,051 | 12.78 | 33.1 | 2,429.7/sq mi (938.1/km^{2}) | October 22, 1956 |
| Sausalito | City | Marin | 7,269 | 1.76 | 4.6 | 4,130/sq mi (1,595/km^{2}) | September 4, 1893 |
| Sebastopol | City | Sonoma | 7,521 | 1.88 | 4.9 | 4,001/sq mi (1,545/km^{2}) | June 13, 1902 |
| Sonoma | City | Sonoma | 10,739 | 2.74 | 7.1 | 3,919/sq mi (1,513.3/km^{2}) | September 3, 1883 |
| South San Francisco | City | San Mateo | 66,105 | 9.20 | 23.8 | 7,185/sq mi (2,774.3/km^{2}) | September 19, 1908 |
| Suisun City | City | Solano | 29,518 | 4.01 | 10.4 | 7,361/sq mi (2,842/km^{2}) | October 9, 1868 |
| Sunnyvale | City | Santa Clara | 155,805 | 22.06 | 57.1 | 7,062.8/sq mi (2,727.0/km^{2}) | December 24, 1912 |
| Tiburon | Town | Marin | 9,146 | 4.48 | 11.6 | 2,041.5/sq mi (788.2/km^{2}) | June 23, 1964 |
| Union City | City | Alameda | 70,143 | 19.18 | 49.7 | 3,657.1/sq mi (1,412.0/km^{2}) | January 26, 1959 |
| Vacaville | City | Solano | 102,386 | 29.87 | 77.4 | 3,427.7/sq mi (1,323.45/km^{2}) | August 9, 1892 |
| Vallejo | City | Solano | 126,090 | 30.42 | 78.8 | 4,145.0/sq mi (1,600.4/km^{2}) | March 30, 1868 |
| Walnut Creek | City | Contra Costa | 70,127 | 19.76 | 51.2 | 3,548.9/sq mi (1,370.3/km^{2}) | October 21, 1914 |
| Windsor | Town | Sonoma | 26,344 | 7.44 | 19.3 | 3,540.9/sq mi (1,367.1/km^{2}) | July 1, 1992 |
| Woodside | Town | San Mateo | 5,309 | 11.47 | 29.7 | 462.86/sq mi (178.71/km^{2}) | November 16, 1956 |
| Yountville | Town | Napa | 3,436 | 1.49 | 3.9 | 2,306/sq mi (890.4/km^{2}) | February 4, 1965 |

== Gallery ==
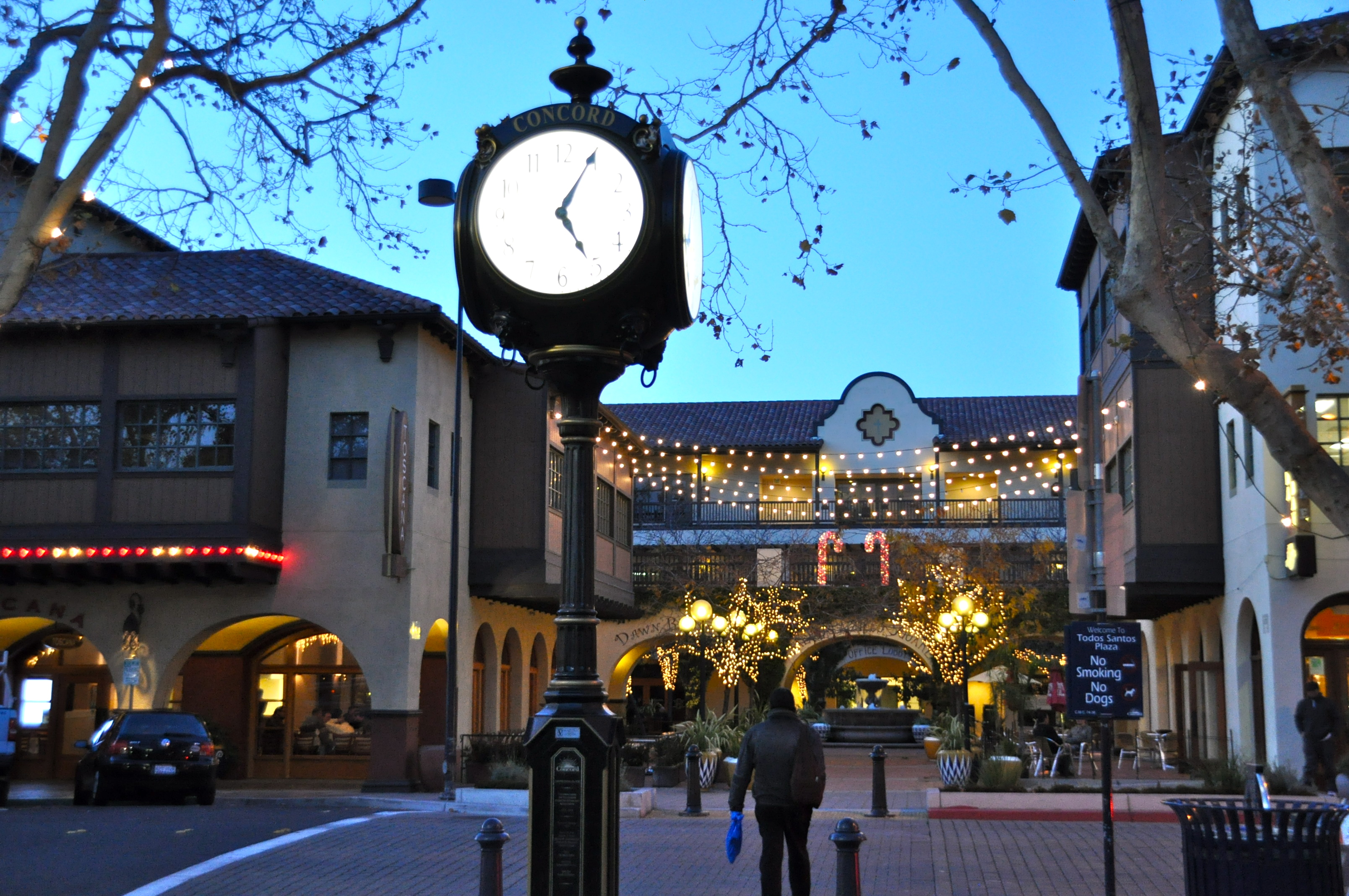
Todos Santos Plaza in Concord

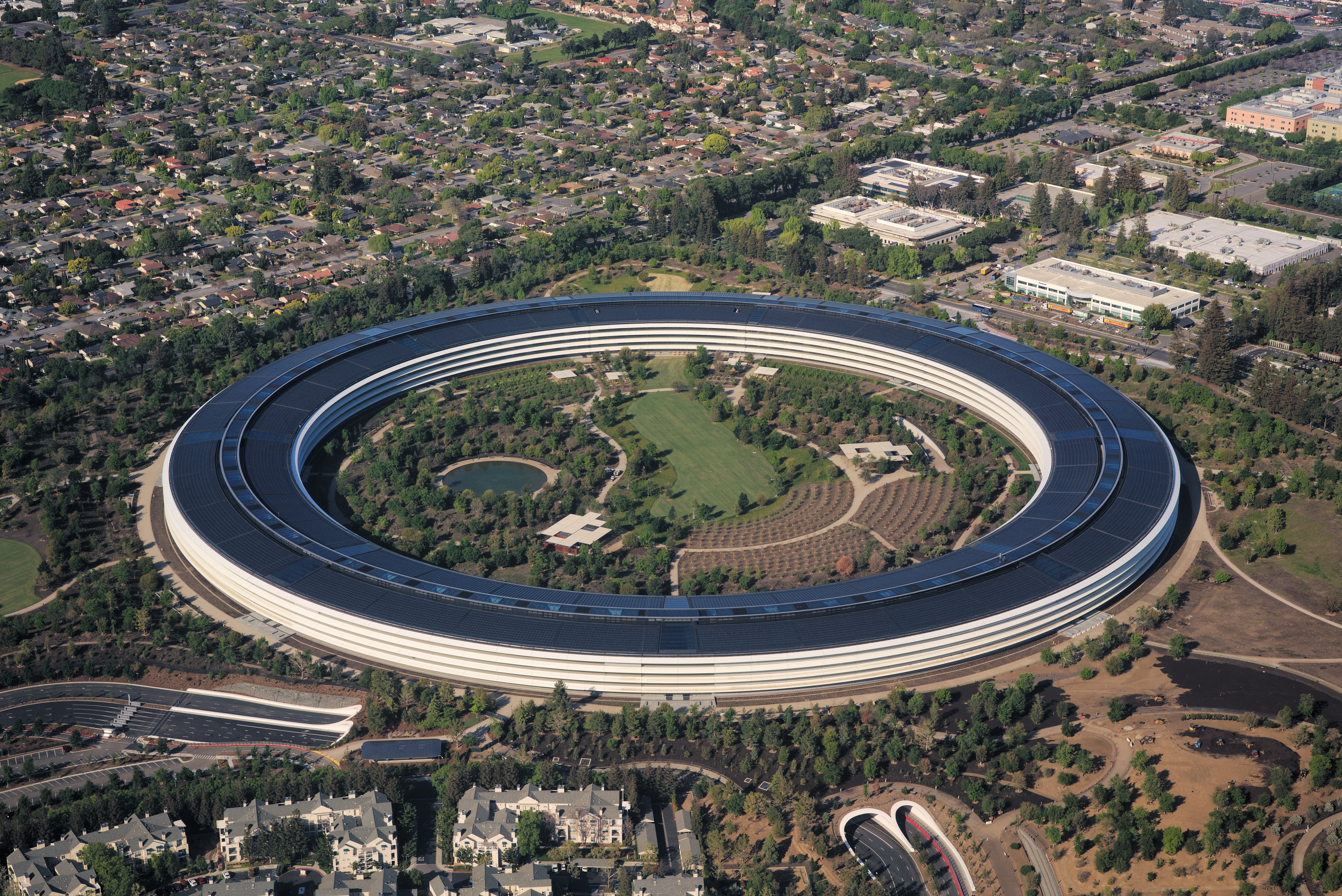
Apple Park in Cupertino

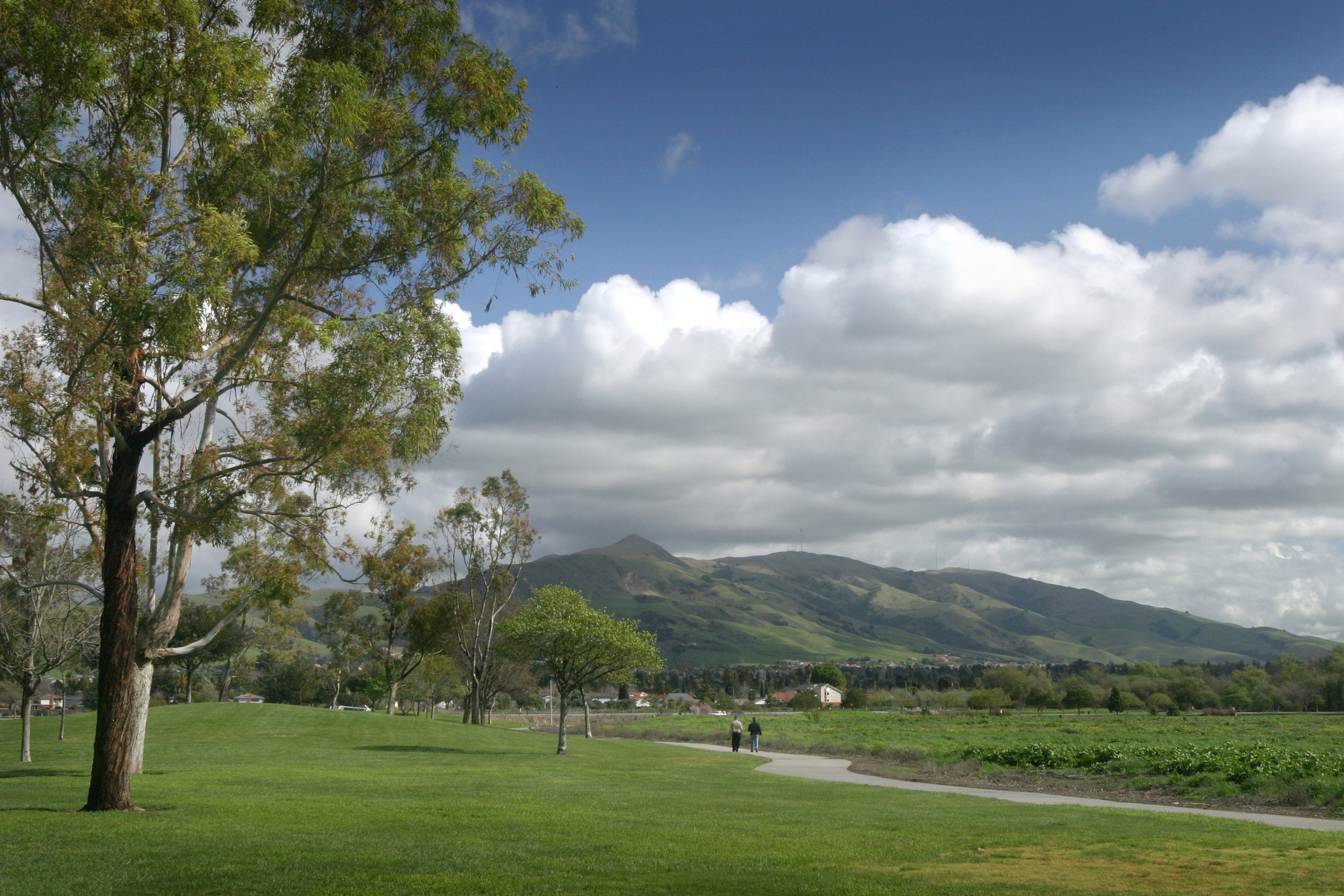
Central Park in Fremont

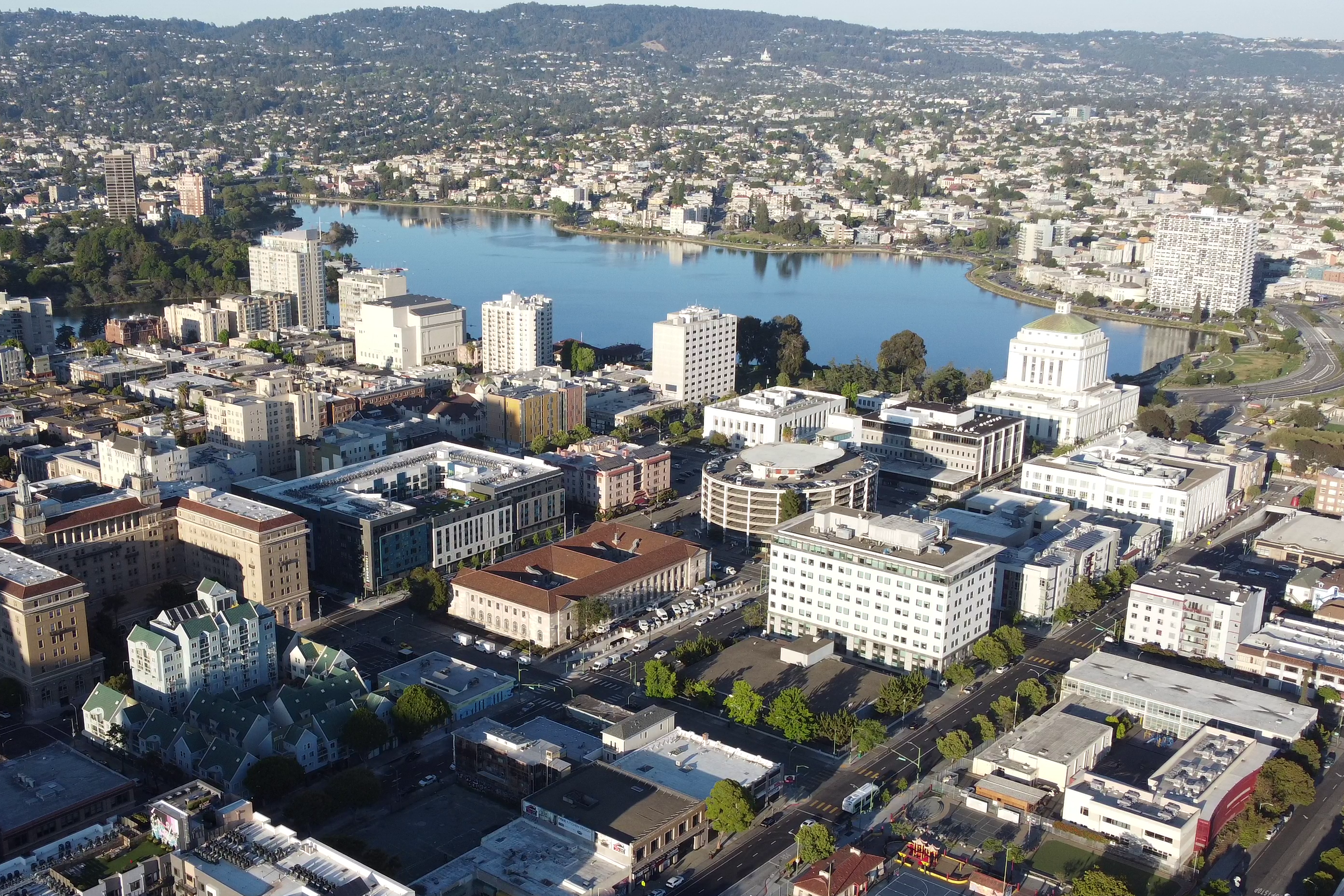
Lake Merritt in Oakland

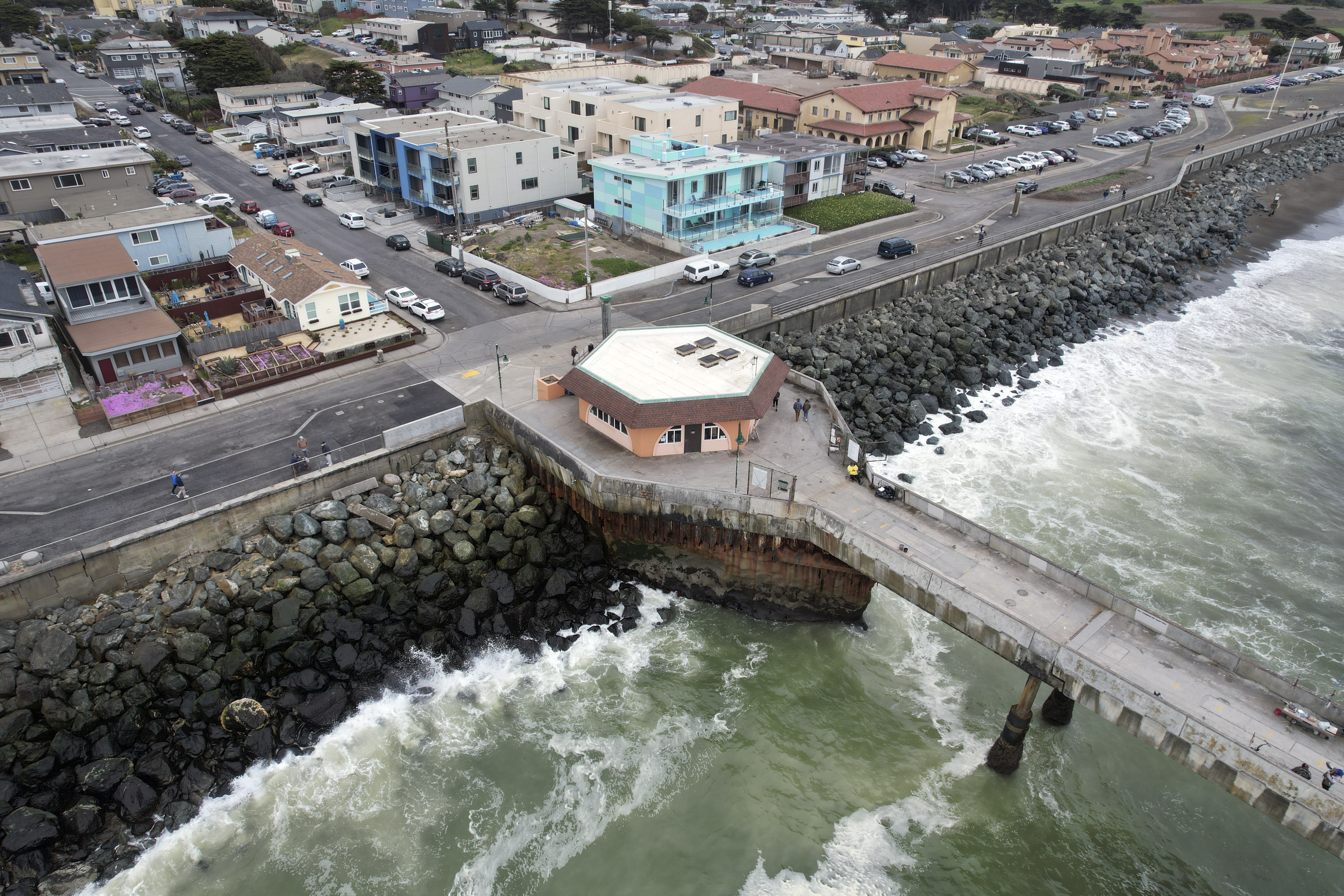
Pier in Pacifica

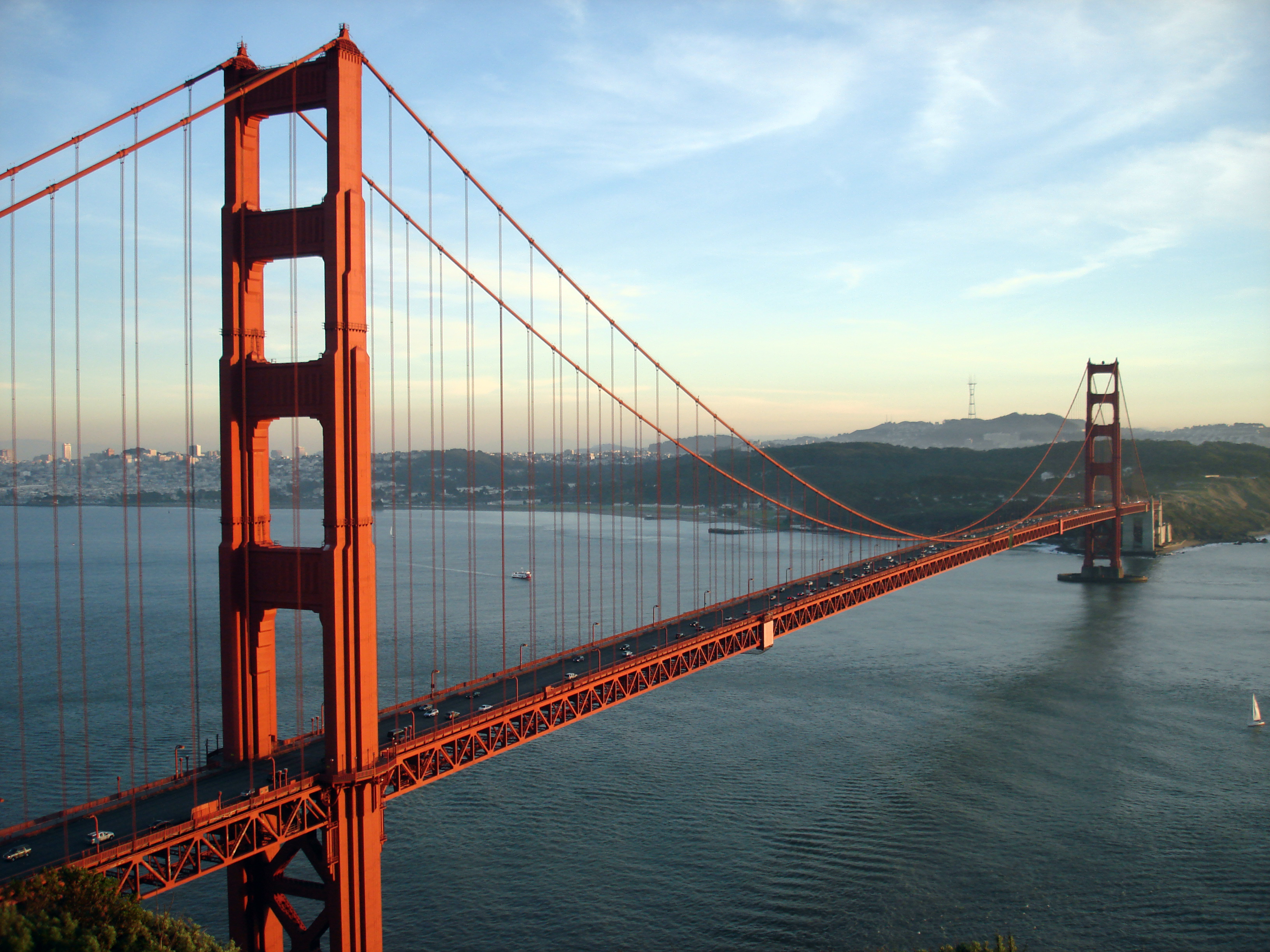
Golden Gate Bridge in San Francisco

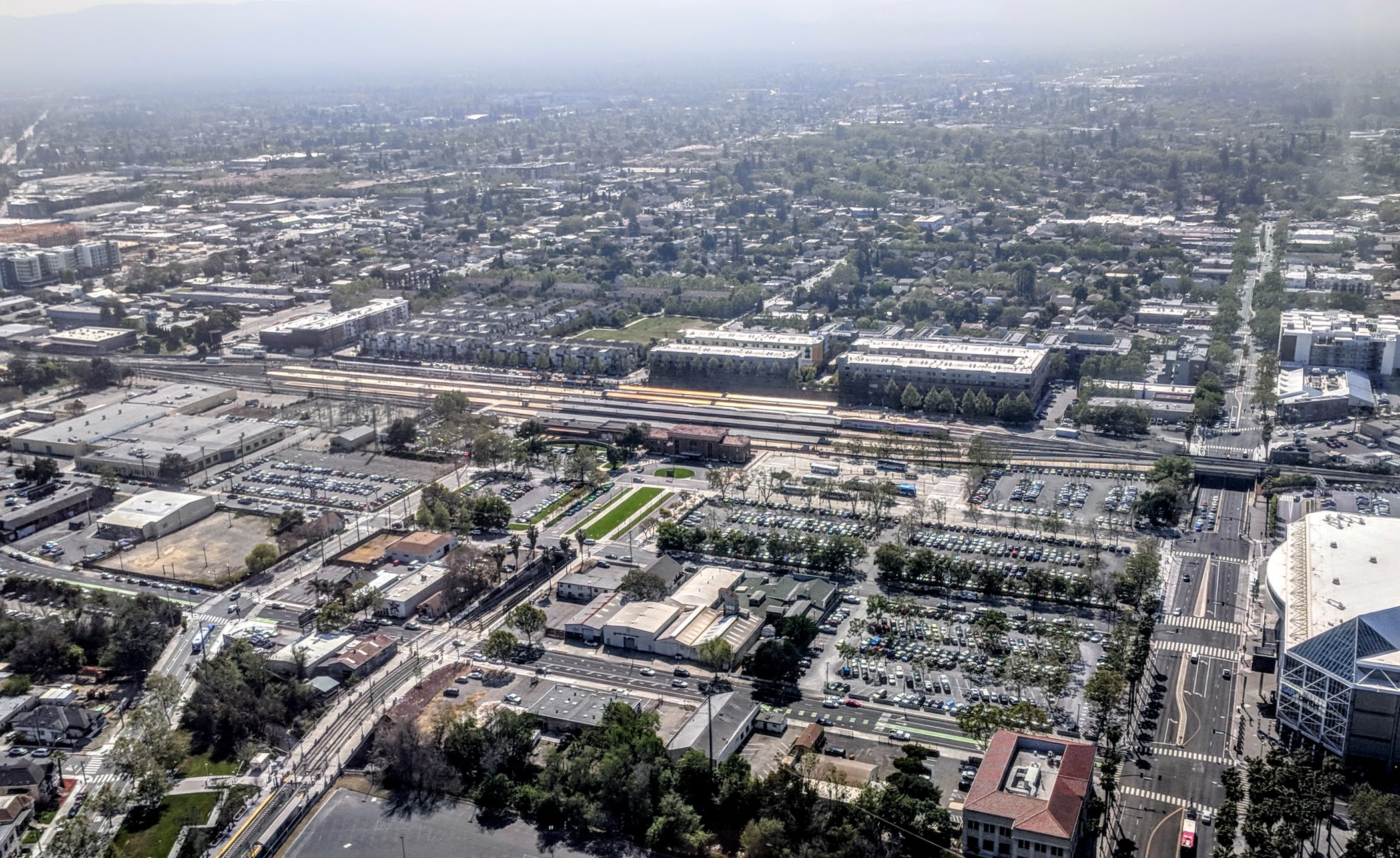
Diridon station in San Jose

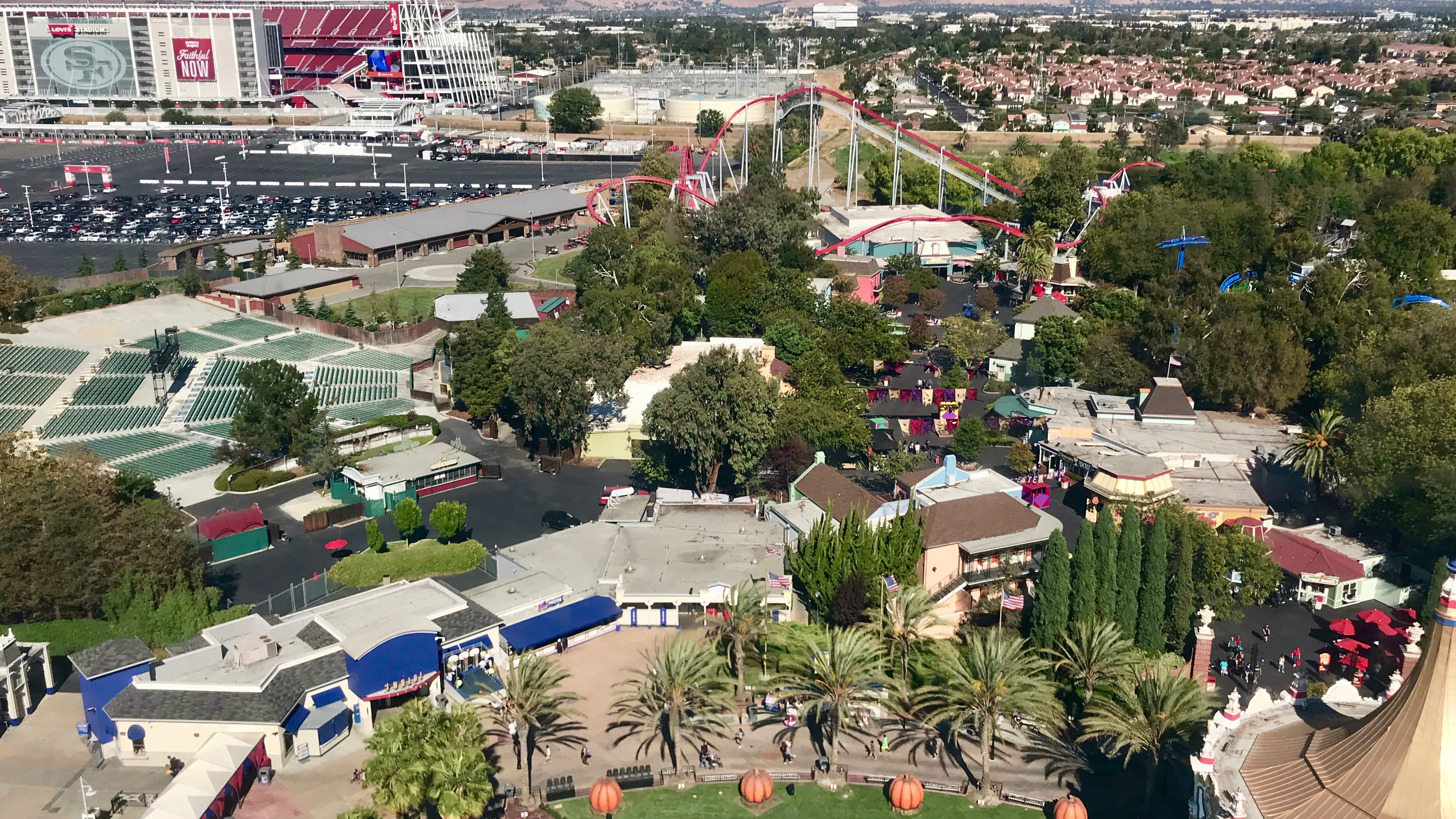
Levi's Stadium in Santa Clara

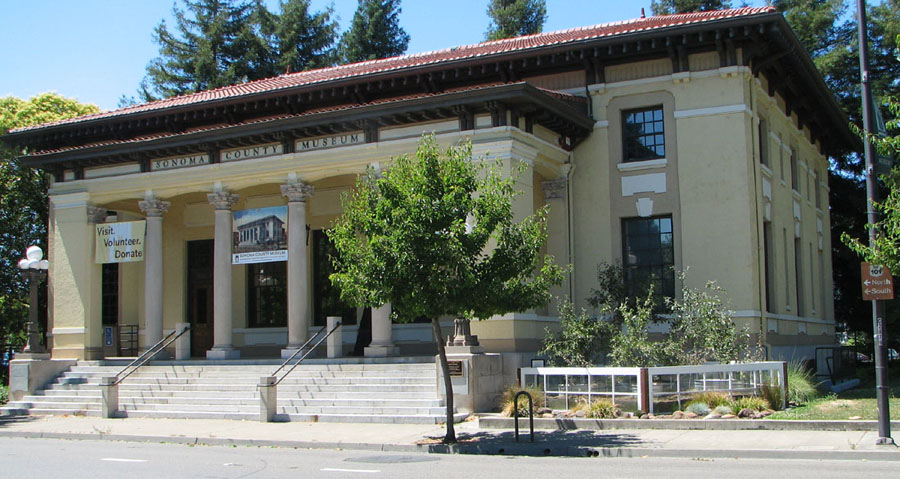
Museum of Sonoma County in Santa Rosa

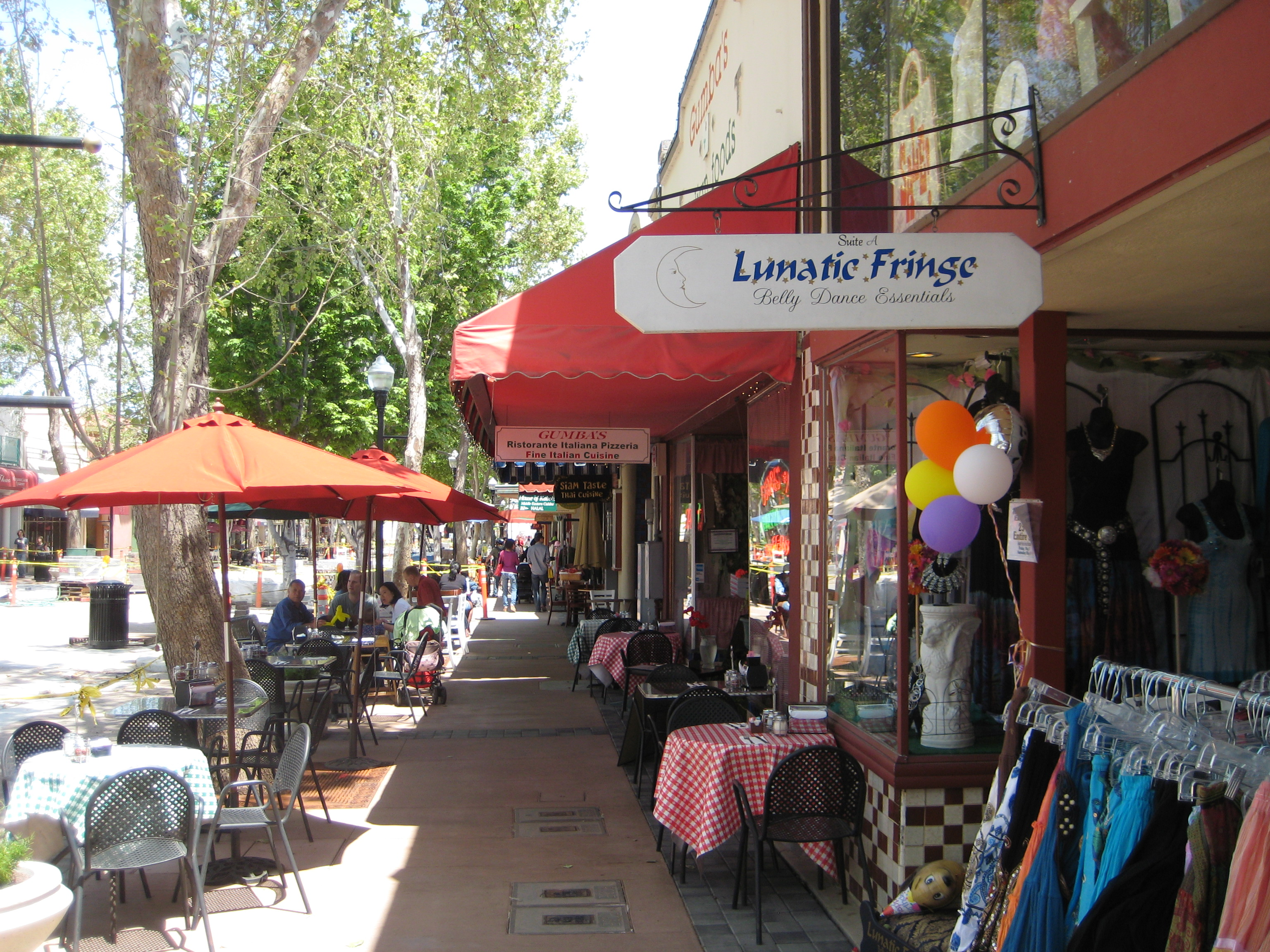
Murphy Street in Sunnyvale

== See also ==
- List of municipalities in California
- List of places in California
- List of largest cities in California by population
