= Sunnyvale Public Library =

Public library in Sunnyvale California

Coordinates: 37.37192°N 122.03910°W

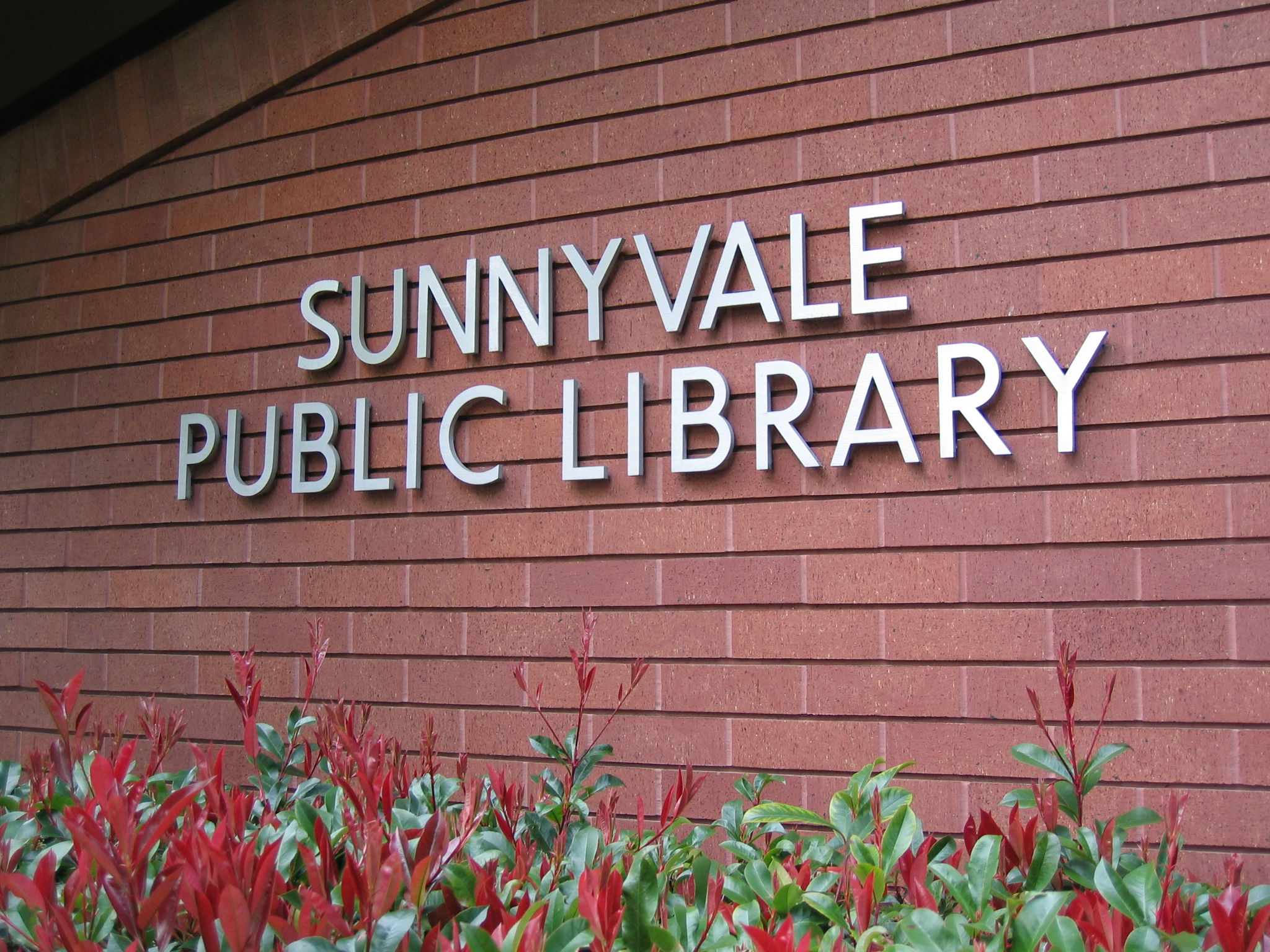
- Location: Sunnyvale, California, USA
- Established: 1914
- Branches: 1

Collection
- Size: 325,795

Access and use
- Circulation: 2,748,170
- Population served: 145,973
- Members: 93,568

Other information
- Budget: 7,889,730
- Director: Michelle Perera
- Employees: 49.84 FTE
- Website: www.sunnyvalelibrary.org

The Sunnyvale Public Library is a public library in Sunnyvale, California.

== History ==
The library was originally the Reading Room, which opened in 1908. It grew from 50 books to 500 within a year. In 1914, the collection, which had been managed by the Women's Christian Temperance Union and had grown to over 1100 books, was passed over to the city to form the Sunnyvale Public Library. It became part of the county library system in 1917.

The library was housed within the Wright building and later within the Civic Auditorium of the old City Hall, on Murphy Avenue. In November 1960, the library moved to its current location on Olive Avenue.

A bookmobile service operated from 1973 to 1978 and again from 1982 to 2003. A branch library opened in 1975 in north Sunnyvale but closed in 1978 due to budget cuts as a result of Proposition 13.

The library building has been expanded twice, in 1970 and 1985 to its current size of 60,800 square feet (5,650 m^{2}). In 2007, a bond measure for $108 million for construction of a new library building failed to pass, receiving only 59.08% of votes cast, short of the 2/3 majority needed for passage.

== Services ==
The library has books, magazines, newspapers, CDs, DVDs, Blu-ray discs, audiobooks, SAMs Photofacts, eBooks, eMagazines, eAudio, streaming video, music, storytimes, and homework help. Free internet access is available using library PCs or client devices.

The library was a Patent and Trademark Resource Center (PTRC). As a PTRC, the Library provided free access to patent and trademark documents in various formats, access to the PubWest database for patent searching, resources for historical patent research, patent searching guides and other reference materials on intellectual property, U.S. Patent and Trademark Office-trained staff to answer patent and trademark questions, and classes and events related to intellectual property.
