= Valencia Park (San Jose) =

Park in San Jose, California, United States

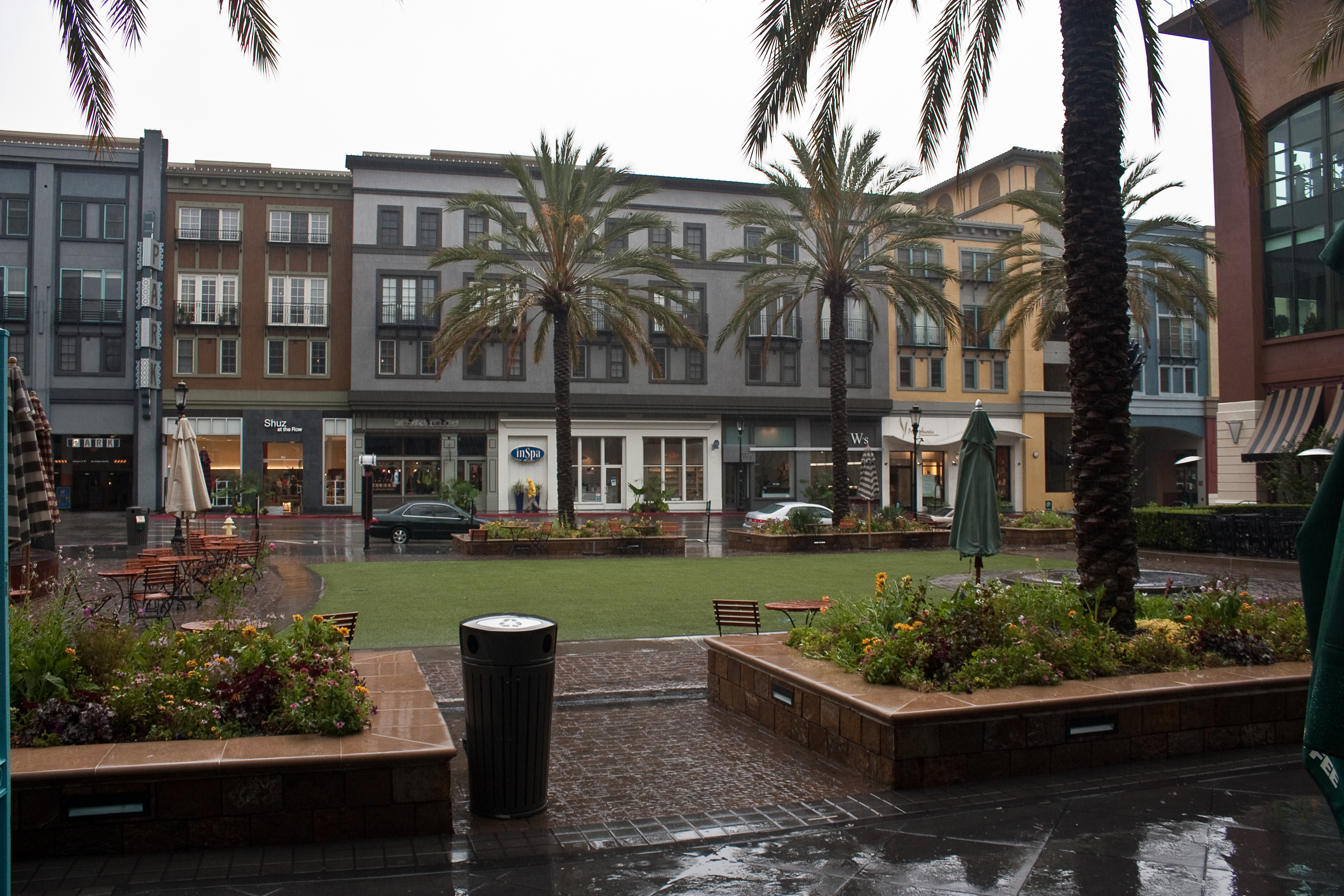
- Interactive map of Valencia Park
- Location: San Jose, California
- Coordinates: 37.3207°N 121.9491°W

Valencia Park is a park in San Jose, California, located in Santana Row.

The park is a popular urban plaza in the city and often the site of local events.

== History ==
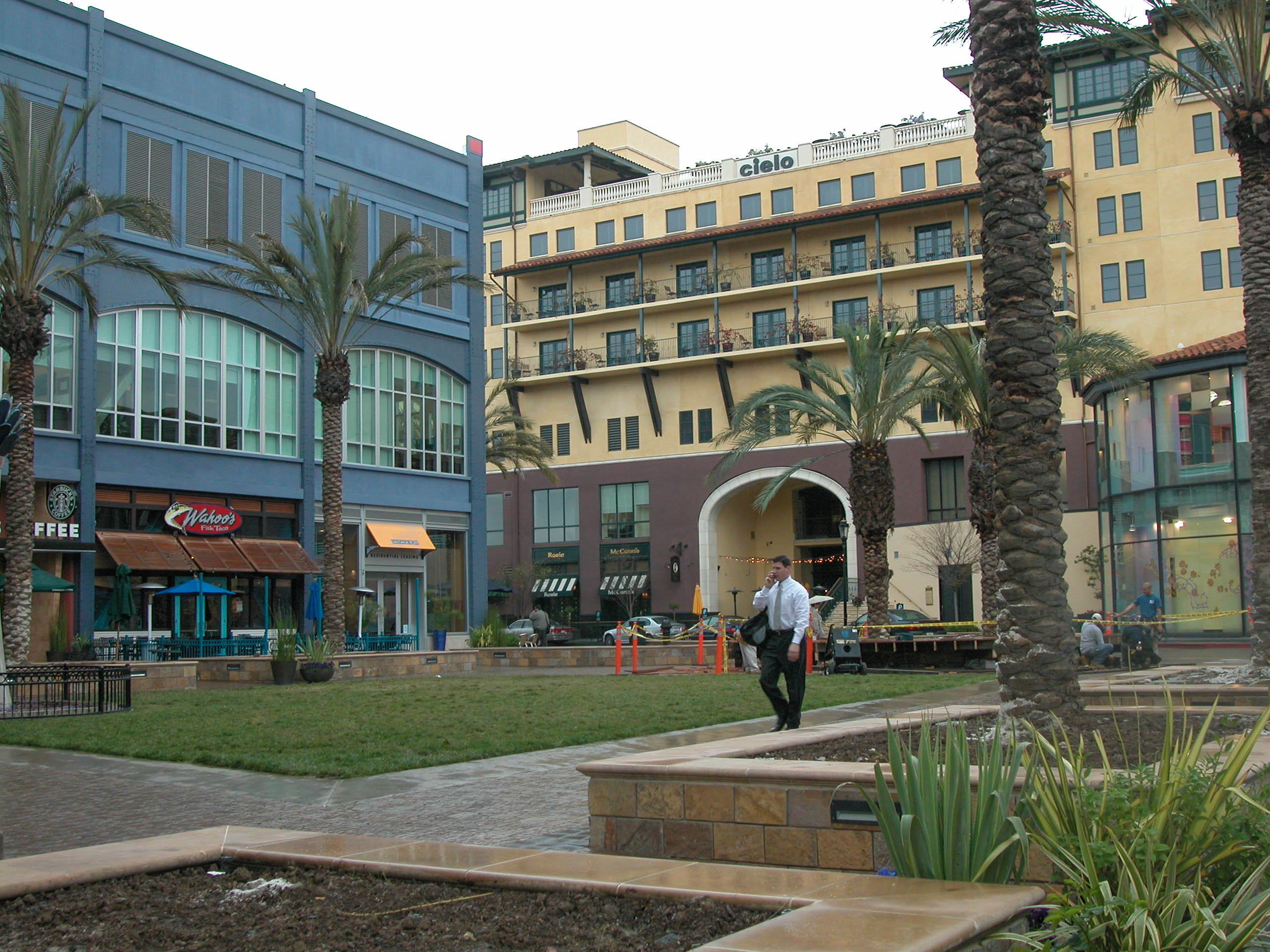
View of the Hotel Valencia.

The park was developed in 2001 as part of the initial redevelopment of Santana Row.

== Location ==
Valencia Park is an urban park plaza in Santana Row, in West San Jose, located on Olin Avenue.

It is within walking distance of Stevens Creek Boulevard, a major area thoroughfare, and Winchester Avenue, a regional artery.

== See also ==
- Santana Row
- Stevens Creek Boulevard
