= Santa Clara County Health System =

County of Santa Clara Health System
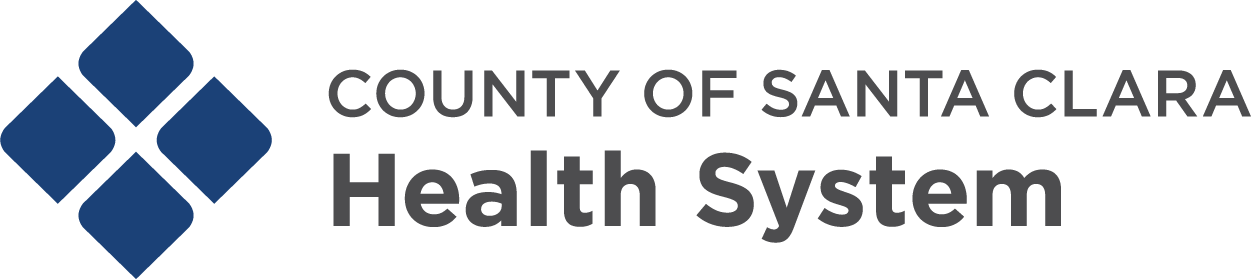

Agency overview
- Jurisdiction: Santa Clara County, California
- Headquarters: Valley Medical Center
- Employees: About 8,000
- Annual budget: $3.9 billion
- Agency executive: Dr. Sara Cody, County Health Officer
- Website: health.santaclaracounty.gov

The County of Santa Clara Health System is the public healthcare system of Santa Clara County, California. It includes a network of county-owned hospitals and clinics called Santa Clara Valley Healthcare, health-related county agencies including the Public Health Department, and a health insurance plan.

== History ==
The Santa Clara Valley Health and Hospital System was established in 1993. It became the Santa Clara County Health System in March 2019 after the county acquired O'Connor Hospital, Saint Louise Regional Hospital, and DePaul Health Center (now VHC Morgan Hill) from Verity Health System to prevent the hospitals' closure. In 2024, the county reached an agreement to purchase Regional Medical Center of San Jose from HCA Healthcare to reverse service cuts.

== Facilities ==
Valley Medical Center, in San Jose, is the flagship hospital of the system.

=== Hospitals ===
Facility	Image	Location	Notes
Flagship hospital
Santa Clara Valley Medical Center		Fruitdale, San Jose	731-bed hospital
Other hospitals
O'Connor Hospital		West San Carlos, San Jose	358-bed hospital
Regional Medical Center		Alum Rock, San Jose	258-bed hospital
St. Louise Regional Hospital		Gilroy	93-bed hospital

=== Valley Health Centers ===
Facility	Image	Location
Valley Health Centers
Valley Health Center Alexian		Alum Rock, San Jose
Valley Health Center Bascom		Fruitdale, San Jose
Valley Health Center Downtown		Downtown San Jose
Valley Health Center East Valley		Alum Rock, San Jose
Valley Health Center Gilroy		Gilroy
Valley Health Center Lenzen		The Alameda, San Jose
Valley Health Center Milpitas		Milpitas
Valley Health Center Moorpark		Fruitdale, San Jose
Valley Health Center Morgan Hill		Morgan Hill
Valley Health Center Sunnyvale		Sunnyvale
Valley Health Center Tully		Monterey Corridor, San Jose

== Agencies and programs ==
- Santa Clara County Behavioral Health Services Department
- Santa Clara County Public Health Department
- Santa Clara County Emergency Medical Services Agency
- Santa Clara County Custody Health Services Department
- Valley Health Plan, a Covered California participating insurance provider

== See also ==
- List of hospitals in San Jose, California
