= List of hospitals in San Jose, California =

This is a list of hospitals in San Jose, California.

- Good Samaritan Hospital
- Kaiser Permanente Santa Clara Medical Center
- Kaiser Permanente San Jose Medical Center
- O'Connor Hospital
- Regional Medical Center of San Jose
- San Jose Medical Center
- Santa Clara Valley Medical Center
- Stanford Hospital and Clinics
- Forest Surgery Center LP
- Npmhu San Jose Branch
- Richmond Steven MS
- Lotus Medical Ctr
- El Camino Hospital Los Gatos
- Kaiser Permanente Fremont Medical Center
- Sequoia Hospital
- Alexian Extended Care Medical

== See also ==
- Santa Clara County Health System
