= San Carlos Street =

City street in San Jose, California

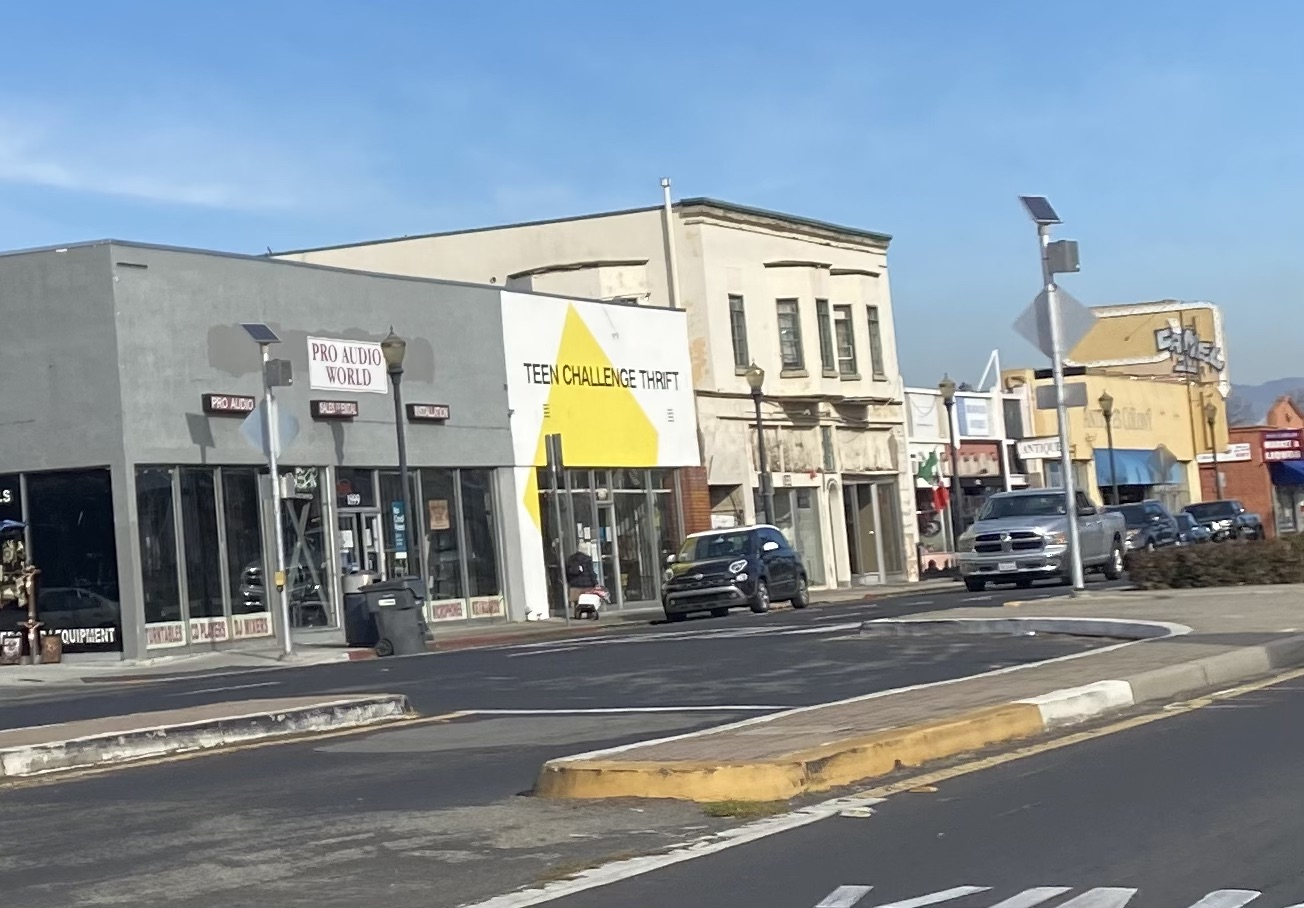
- San Carlos Street near its western terminus
- Length: 3.2 mi (5.1 km)
- West end: Bascom Avenue/Stevens Creek Boulevard in San Jose, California
- Major junctions: Buena Vista Avenue; Muller Place; Meridian Avenue; Race Street; Leigh Ave/Shasta Ave; Gap in route; South 10th Street; South 11th Street
- East end: South 17th Street in San Jose, California

San Carlos Street is a major east–west city street in San Jose, California. It consists of two unconnected parts. The western part is an arterial road from Stevens Creek Boulevard to South 4th Street, and the eastern part is a residential street from South 10th Street to South 17th Street. Major intersections include Buena Vista Avenue, Muller Place, Meridian Avenue, Race Street, and Leigh Avenue.

== Route description ==
=== Western segment ===
San Carlos Street begins in the west at Bascom Avenue as a continuation of Stevens Creek Boulevard. It then heads east as a four-lane road toward Downtown San Jose. On this section, San Carlos Street has several signalized intersections.

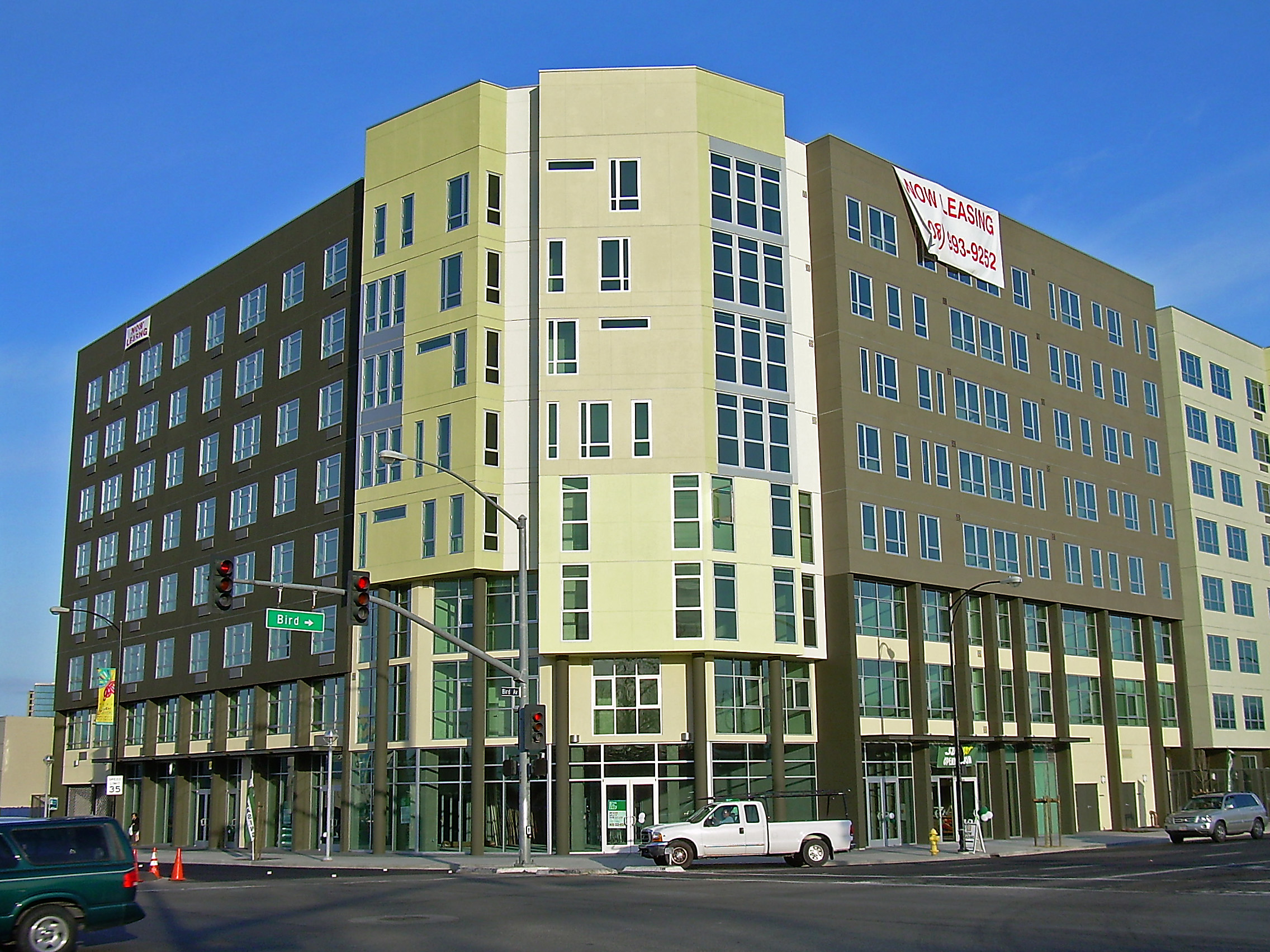
The intersection of San Carlos Street and Bird Avenue.

After meeting CA-87, San Carlos Street continues for 0.7 more miles before terminating near San Jose State University in Downtown San Jose.

=== Eastern segment ===
To the east of San Jose State University, San Carlos Street begins again at an intersection with South 10th Street. It then continues as a residential street for 0.4 miles before ending at South 17th Street.

== History ==
At the start of the 1900s, commercial development on the Stevens Creek Road/San Carlos Street corridor was increasing. It was made into a major road stretching across San Jose. In 1933, viaducts were constructed to carry San Carlos Street over the Los Gatos Creek and Southern Pacific (SP) tracks.
