= Bayfair Center =

Coordinates: 37.7005°N 122.1277°W

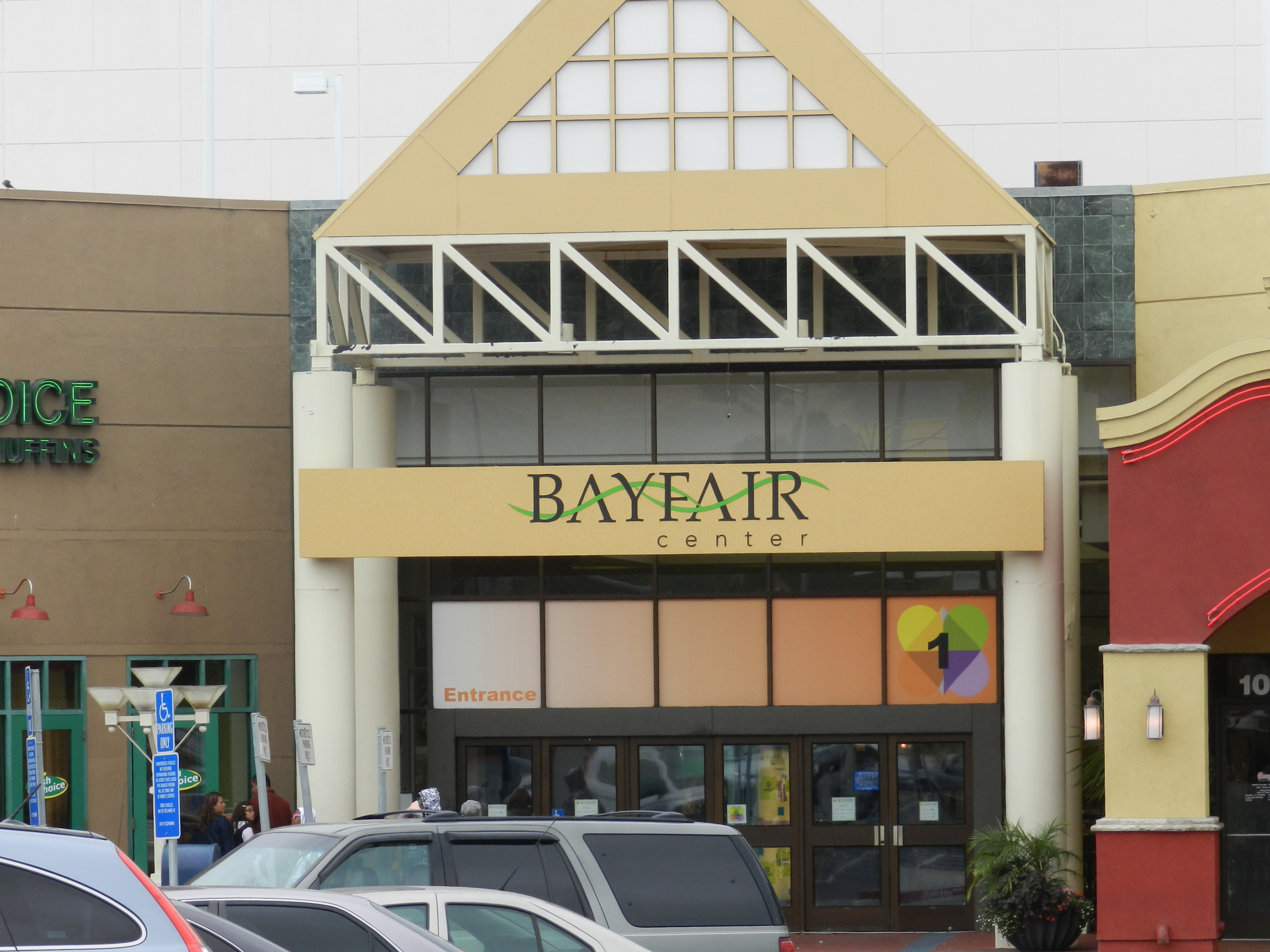
- Location: San Leandro, California, U.S.
- Opened: November 8, 1957 (original indoor mall)
- Closed: 2023 (original indoor mall was converted to a technology hub)
- Owner: B3 and Gaw Capital Partners
- Architect: Victor Gruen Associates
- Num. of stores: 100+
- Num. of anchor tenants: 4
- Floor area: 820,000 square feet (76,000 m^{2})
- Floors: 2 (3 in former Macy's)
- Website: shopbayfair.com (archived)

Bayfair Center (originally Bay-Fair, later Bay Fair, and Bayfair Mall) is a power center and regional shopping mall in San Leandro, California, United States. It was among the first malls in the East Bay of the San Francisco Bay Area. Anchors are Target, Kohl's and a 16-screen Century Theatres cinema operated by Cinemark. Junior anchors include PetSmart and 24 Hour Fitness. Vantage Robotics operates a manufacturing, research, and shipping facility inside the former Macy’s and within the indoor portion of the mall.

== History ==
=== Development (1950s) ===
Announced in April 1953, the shopping center was built on the 48-acre site of the former Oakland Speedway automobile racing stadium, and cost $25 million to build, and an additional $6 million to build the anchor department store, a 200,000-square-foot (19,000 m^{2}), three-story Macy's. The mall construction did not begin until 1956.

The architect (including for the interior) for the Macy's store was John Savage Bolles, who had designed Candlestick Park and also designed interiors for Macy's Hilltop Mall in Richmond, Hillsdale Shopping Center in San Mateo, and Valley Fair in San Jose, and interiors for the renovation of the Macy's Union Square San Francisco flagship store.

Macy's was the first unit to open, on August 8, 1957, with mall shops opening in the months following. On November 8, 1957, 19 new stores (besides Macy's), including a supermarket, celebrated their grand opening.

The mall shop area (outside Macy's) was open-air and in an L-shape, split-level (i.e. on two levels, but not two stories one on top of another). It claimed to be the first shopping center in the Western United States to be built across two stories.

=== Expansion (1960s–1990s) ===
The mall continued to expand, and a new department store anchor, Montgomery Ward opened a two-story, 159,000 sq ft (14,800 m^{2}) store and auto center on August 4, 1971. With Ward's the mall had grown to 600,000 sq ft (56,000 m^{2}) in size and had 62 stores.

In 1972, Bay Area Rapid Transit opened Bay Fair station adjacent to the mall to the south, providing access via rapid rail transit.

In 1977, owner Macy's announced a major renovation of the mall. It was enclosed and added escalators, air conditioning and carpeting. On the ground level, 18,000 sq ft (1,700 m^{2}) of retail space was added on and a further 4,000 sq ft (370 m^{2}) atrium and "specialty court" for boutiques and restaurants. On the new second level, 16,200 sq ft (1,510 m^{2}) of retail space was added. In a second pase, 12,000 sq ft (1,100 m^{2}) of retail space was adjacent to Macy's and 32,000 sq ft (3,000 m^{2}) elsewhere. In total, 82,000 sq ft (7,600 m^{2}) of space was added for about 40 additional shops, for a total of about 100 shops.

A T.J. Maxx anchor opened April 28, 1994.

=== Hybrid power center (2000s–2022) ===
In 2001, Montgomery Ward went bankrupt and closed its stores nationwide. The abandoned Ward's store was demolished and in October 2002, a 145,000 sq ft (13,500 m^{2}) Target Greatland opened on the site.

Also In late 2002, the mall was acquired by Chicago-based M & J Wilkow Ltd. The updated shopping center measured 820,000 sq ft (76,000 m^{2}). Bayfair's owner planned to remodel the ailing center into an open-air power center, renamed "Bayfair/580," which would have several big-box tenants and upscale "lifestyle-oriented" stores. The plan never came to fruition, however, and the mall was sold to Madison Marquette in late 2003.

The Macy's continues to operate and the mall is enclosed, but by 2012, the other anchors were more typical of those in a power center: big box stores Kohl's, Staples, Old Navy, PetSmart, Bed Bath & Beyond, and 24 Hour Fitness. There was also a Cinemark cinema multiplex. According to the city of San Leandro in a 2016 study, Bayfair has been successful in transforming itself to a tenant mix that meets with current needs.

On September 22, 2022, it was announced that Bed Bath & Beyond would be closing as part of a plan to close 150 stores nationwide.

=== Redevelopment (2024–present) ===
B3 investors, a San Leandro-based developer, and Hong Kong-based Gaw Capital Partners purchased Bayfair Center in 2022 for $57 million. The mall was redeveloped into the Speedway at Bayfair, a mixed-use campus that offers spaces for studio, production, and research and development. The campus rents to technology companies specializing in science, material science, robotics, and biotechnology. B3 Investors acquired the Macy's anchor store in 2024 to incorporate it with the campus after Macy's closed in March as part of a plan to close 5 stores nationwide.

== Plans for transit-oriented village ==
In 2018, the city of San Leandro adopted a plan to transform the Bay Fair neighborhood, including the mall and areas around it, into a transit-oriented "village", a high-density, mixed-use neighborhood with a street grid of small blocks to encourage walking and cycling, and including small parks and space for community events.

== See also ==
- Westfield Valley Fair
