= Midtown San Jose =

- Neighborhood of San Jose
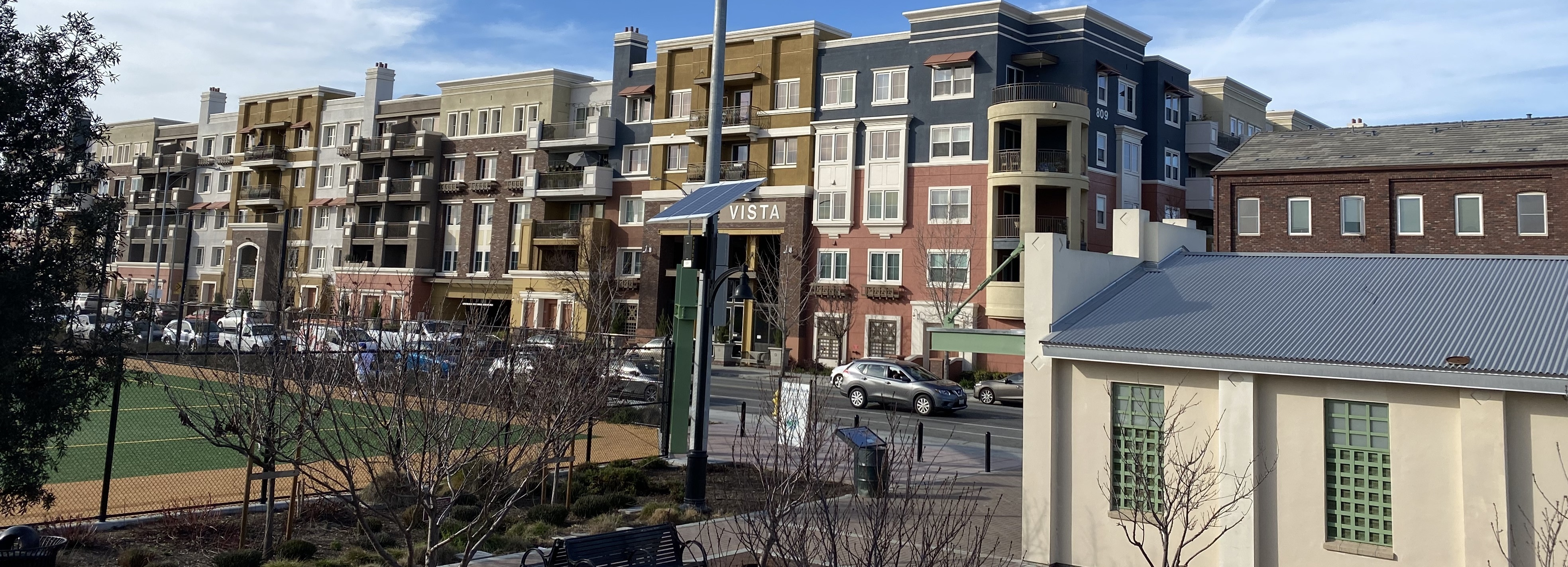
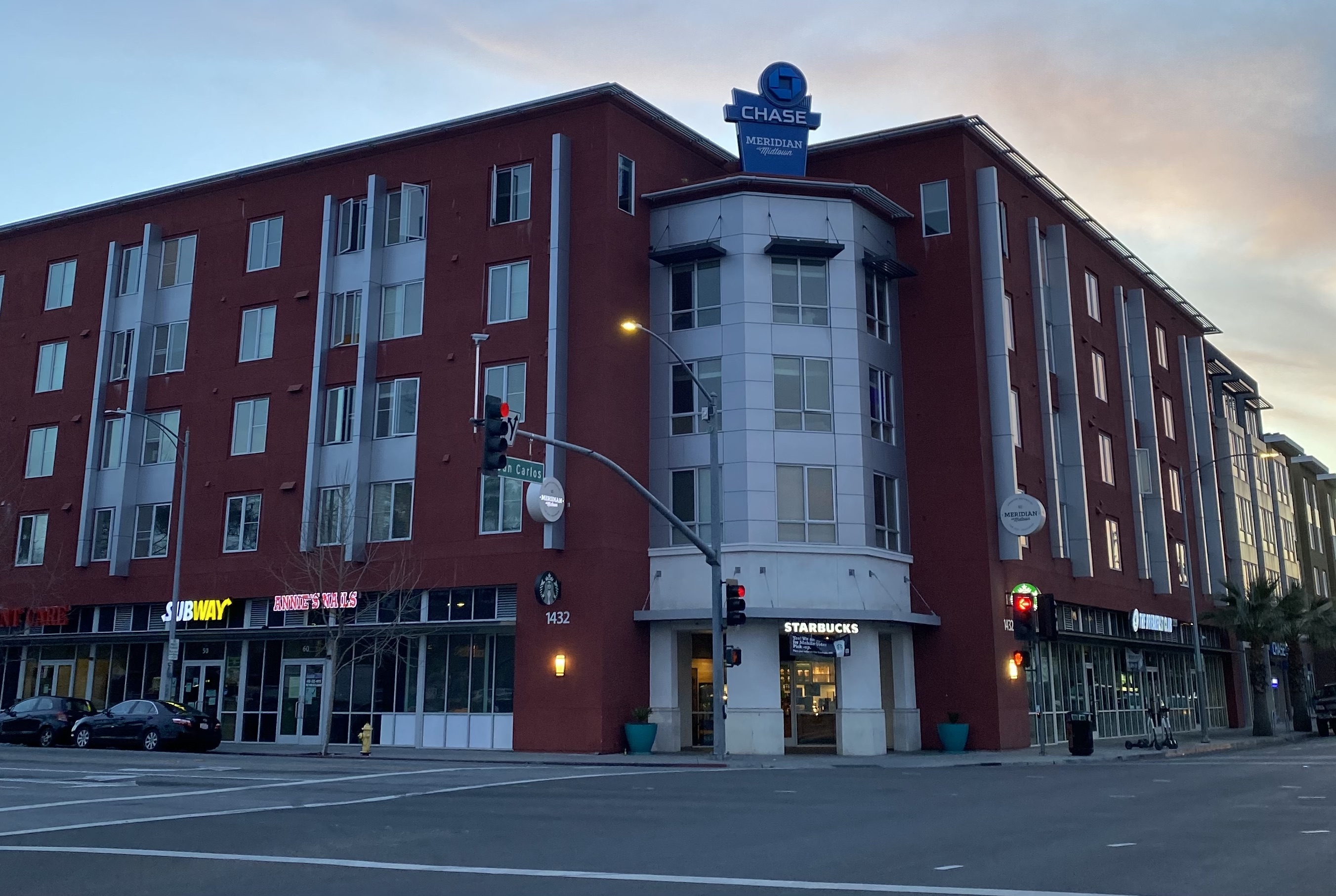
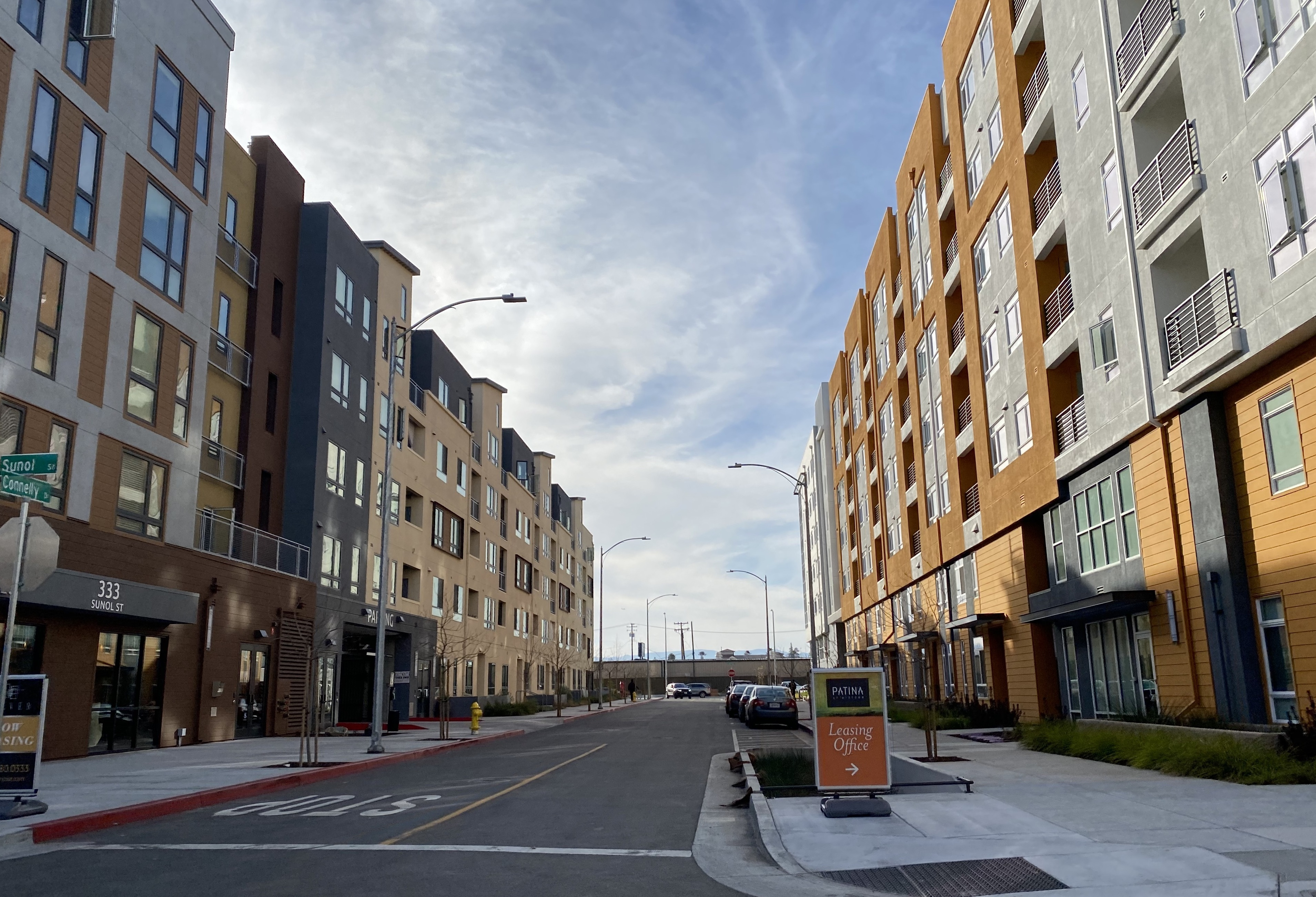
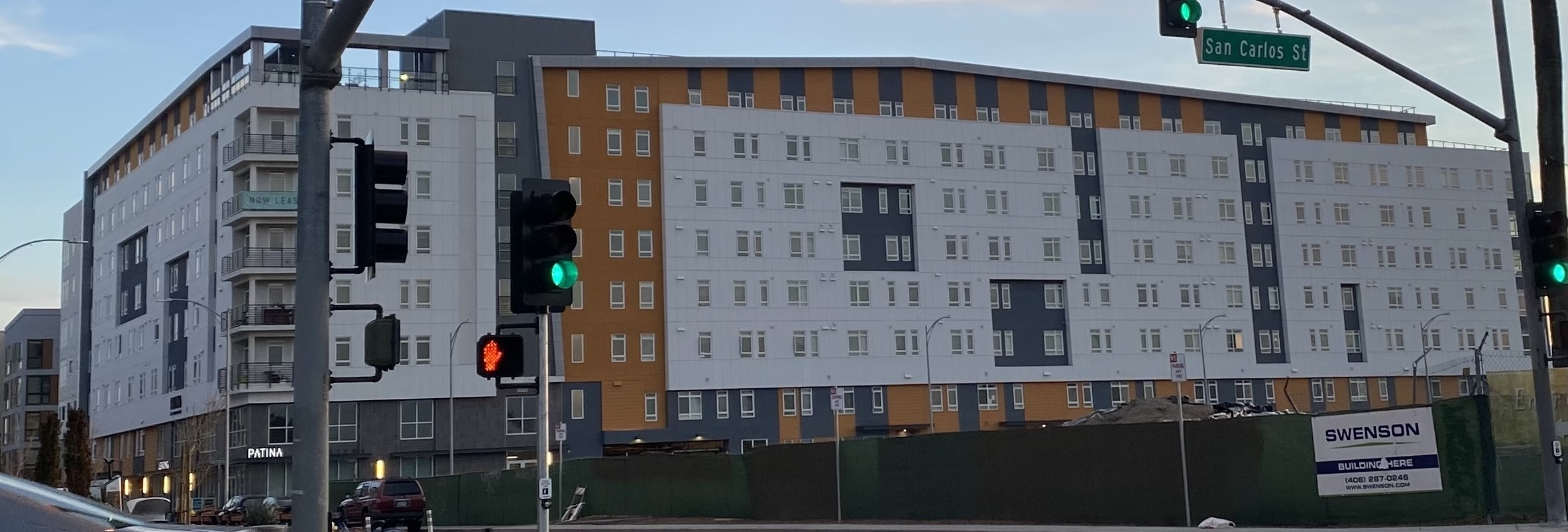

- Location in Santa Clara County and the state of California
- Coordinates: 37°19′29″N 121°54′37″W
- Country: United States
- State: California
- County: Santa Clara
- City: San Jose

Area
  - Total: 0.077 sq mi (0.2 km^{2})
  - Land: 0.077 sq mi (0.2 km^{2})
  - Water: 0 sq mi (0 km^{2})

Population (2000)
  - Total: 748
  - Density: 9,700/sq mi (3,740/km^{2})
- Time zone: UTC-8 (PST)
  - Summer (DST): UTC-7 (PDT)
- ZIP code: 95126
- Area codes: 408/669
- FIPS code: 06-77049
- Website: www.midtownsanjose.net

Midtown San Jose is a mixed commercial and residential district of San Jose, California, to the southwest of Downtown San Jose and east of West San Carlos.

== History ==
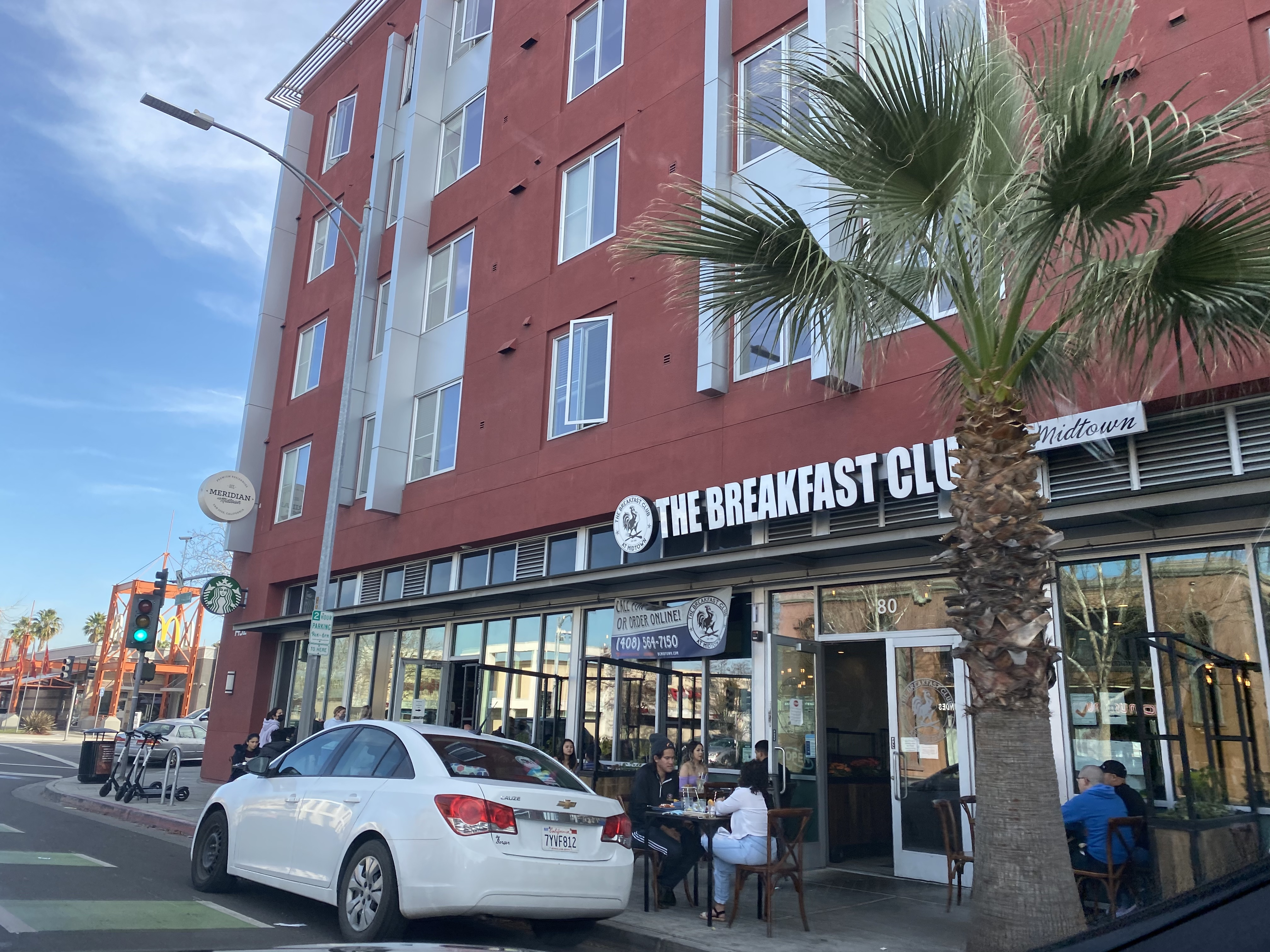
Apartments on San Carlos St.

The area was a census-designated place and primarily residential area in Santa Clara County, California, United States. It has been annexed to San Jose. The population was 748 at the 2000 census.

It is designated one of San Jose's Urban Village and is part of the Envision San Jose 2040 plan the city rolled out in 2012. The focus is on building high-density housing along the West San Carlos Street corridor, replacing the older mixed-use buildings.

== Geography ==
Sunol-Midtown is located at 37°19′29″N 121°54′37″W (37.324841, -121.910198).

According to the United States Census Bureau, the CDP had a total area of 0.1 square miles (0.26 km^{2}), all of it land.

== Demographics ==
Historical population
Census	Pop.	Note	%±
2000	748		—
U.S. Decennial Census; 1860–1870 1880-1890; 1900 1910 1920; 1930 1940 1950; 1960 1970 1980; 1990 2000 2010

Sunol-Midtown first appeared as a census designated place in the 2000 U.S. census. It was deleted prior to the 2010 U.S. census after being annexed to San Jose city.

=== 2000 ===
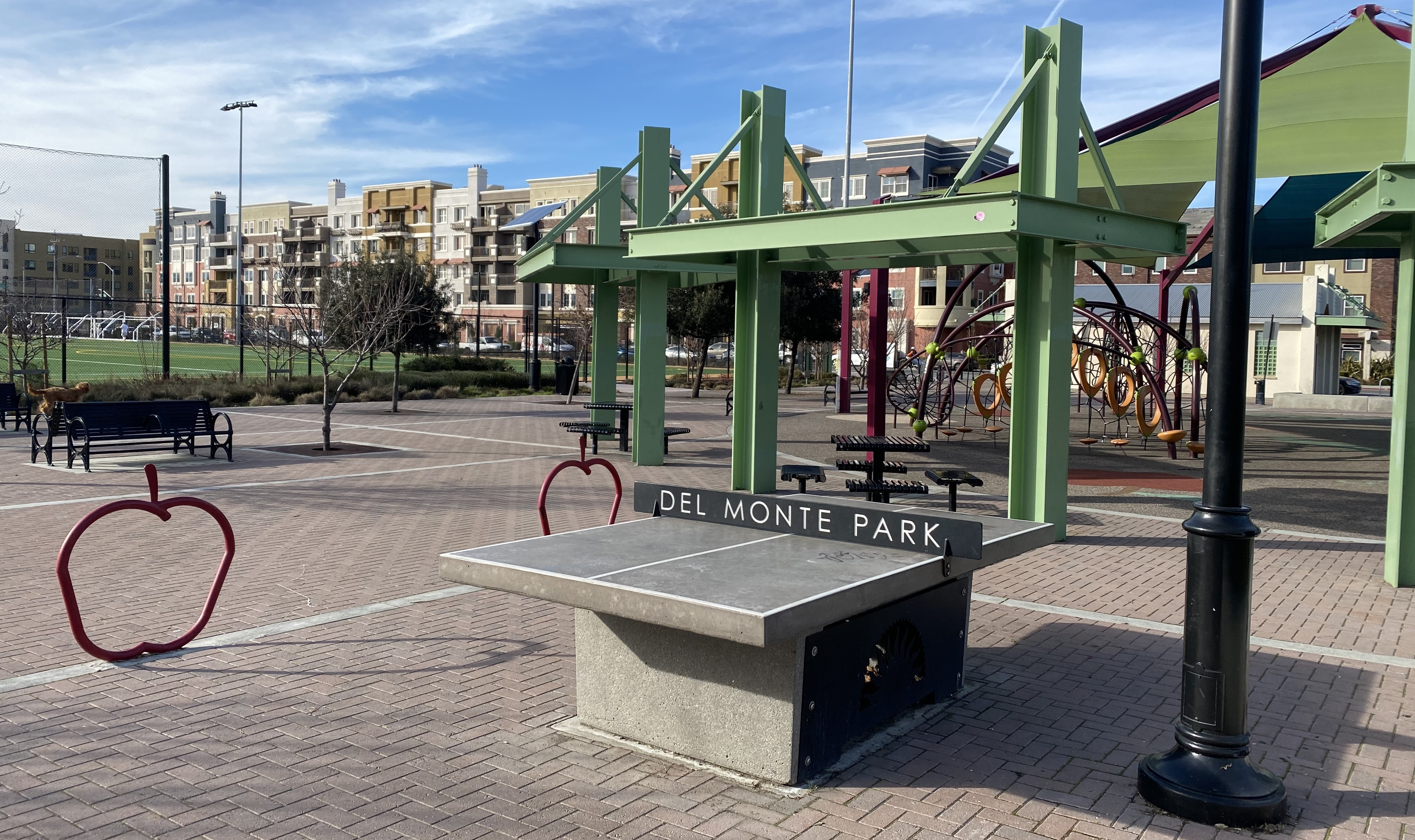
Del Monte Park

(These demographics are only for the unincorporated portions of the area in 2000. The parts of the neighborhood in San Jose are included in that city's article as well as 2010 data when the whole area was annexed.)

As of the census of 2000, there were 748 people, 243 households, and 142 families residing in the CDP. The population density was 8,762.0 people per square mile (3,208.9/km^{2}). There were 256 housing units at an average density of 2,998.7 per square mile (1,098.2/km^{2}). The racial makeup of the CDP was 49.73% White, 1.47% African American, 1.34% Native American, 3.34% Asian, 0.13% Pacific Islander, 38.10% from other races, and 5.88% from two or more races. Hispanic or Latino of any race were 64.30% of the population.

There were 243 households, out of which 32.9% had children under the age of 18 living with them, 35.8% were married couples living together, 14.4% had a female householder with no husband present, and 41.2% were non-families. 29.6% of all households were made up of individuals, and 6.2% had someone living alone who was 65 years of age or older. The average household size was 3.07 and the average family size was 3.76.

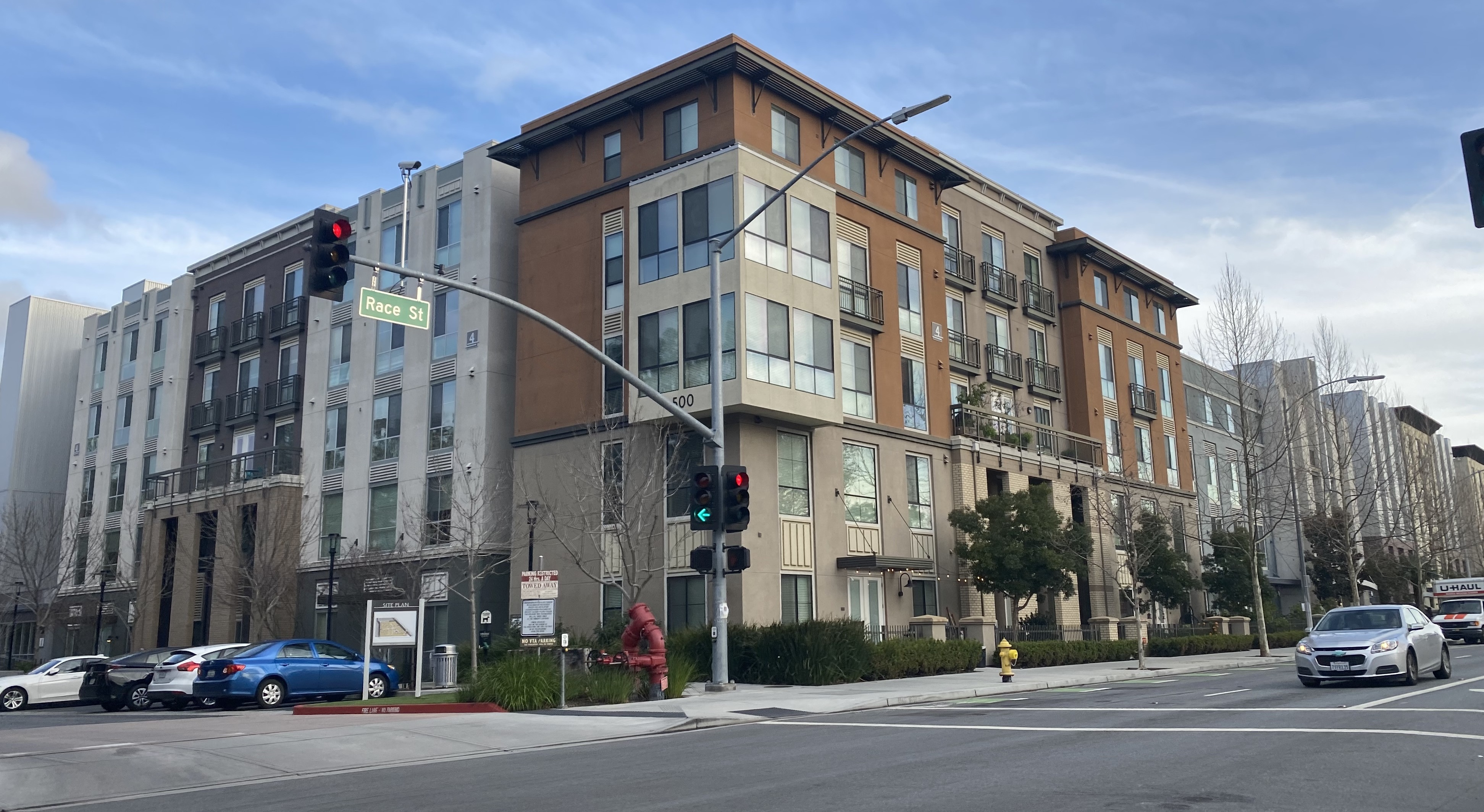
Mid-rises on Race Street

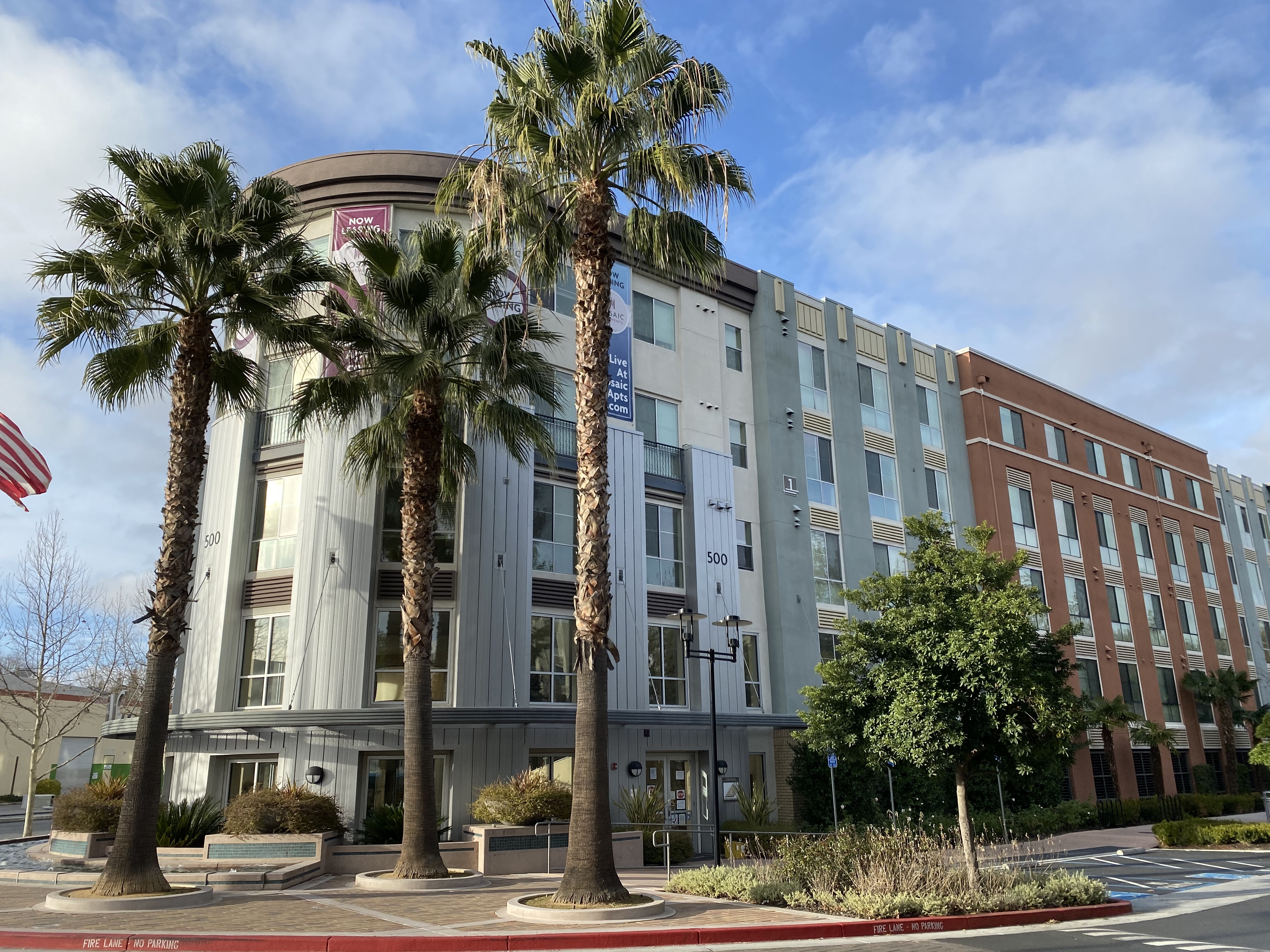
The Mosaic in Midtown

In the CDP, the population was spread out, with 27.0% under the age of 18, 11.2% from 18 to 24, 36.6% from 25 to 44, 18.0% from 45 to 64, and 7.1% who were 65 years of age or older. The median age was 30 years. For every 100 females, there were 104.9 males. For every 100 females age 18 and over, there were 111.6 males.

The median income for a household in the CDP was $47,734, and the median income for a family was $41,071. Males had a median income of $37,143 versus $30,134 for females. The per capita income for the CDP was $17,392. About 9.8% of families and 15.5% of the population were below the poverty line, including 17.8% of those under age 18 and none of those age 65 or over.

== Government ==
In the California State Legislature, Sunol-Midtown is in the 15th senatorial district, represented by Democrat Dave Cortese, and in the 28th Assembly district, represented by Democrat Gail Pellerin.

In the United States House of Representatives, Sunol-Midtown is in California's 19th congressional district, represented by Democrat Jimmy Panetta.

== Transportation ==
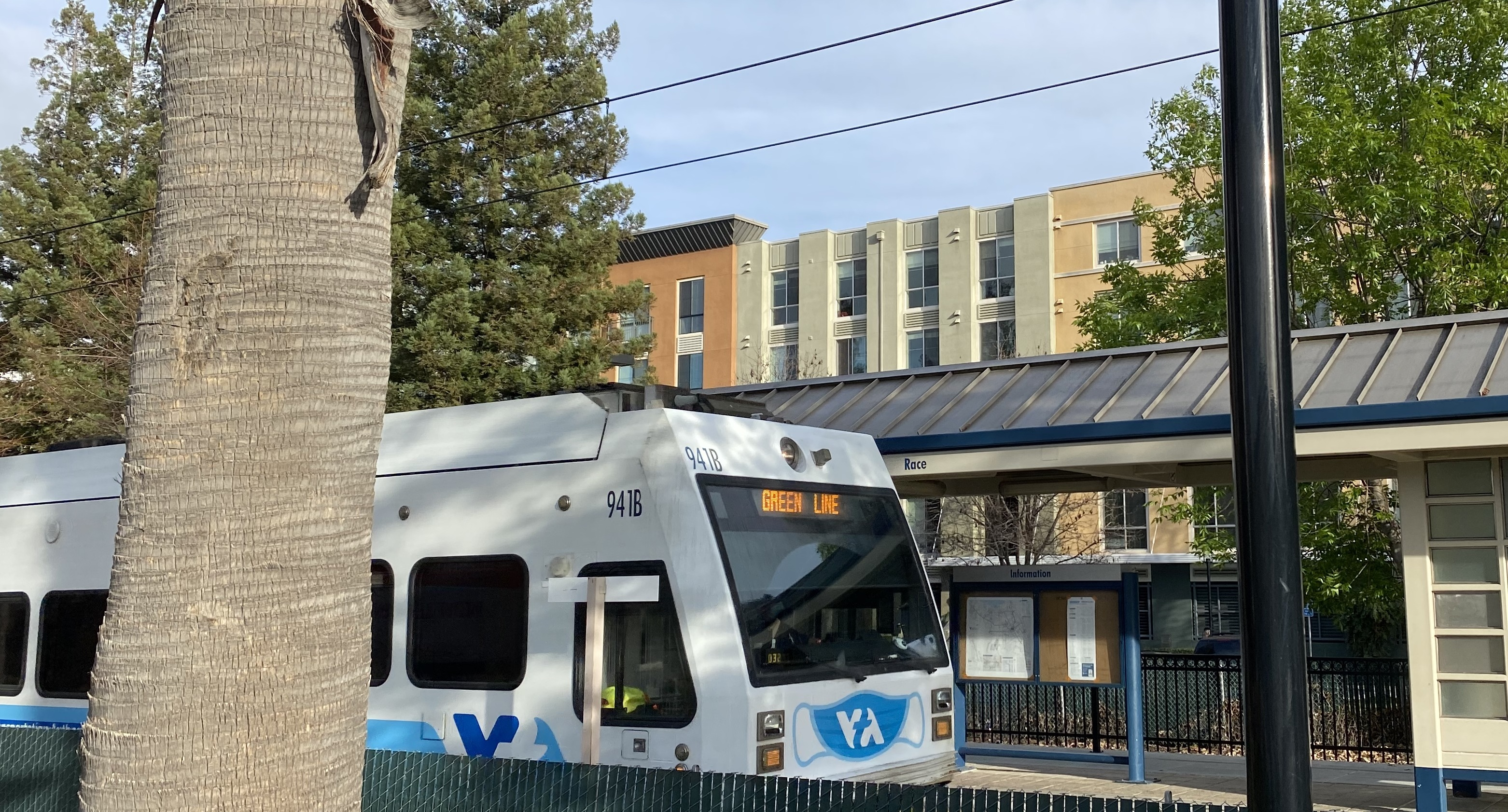
Race St. station of VTA light rail

Midtown is well connected to transportation infrastructure. It is directly south of Diridon Station, which serves Caltrain and eventually Bay Area Rapid Transit (BART). The area also has easy access to the Junipero Serra Freeway (CA-280).

The area is served by VTA light rail at the Race Street station.

== Parks and plazas ==
- Del Monte Park
- O'Connor Park
