= Kerasotes Theatres =

Movie theater operator in the USA

- Industry: Entertainment (movie theatres)
- Founded: 1909; 117 years ago
- Defunct: 2024
- Successors: AMC Theatres
- Headquarters: Chicago, Illinois
- Key people: Gus Kerasotes, founder

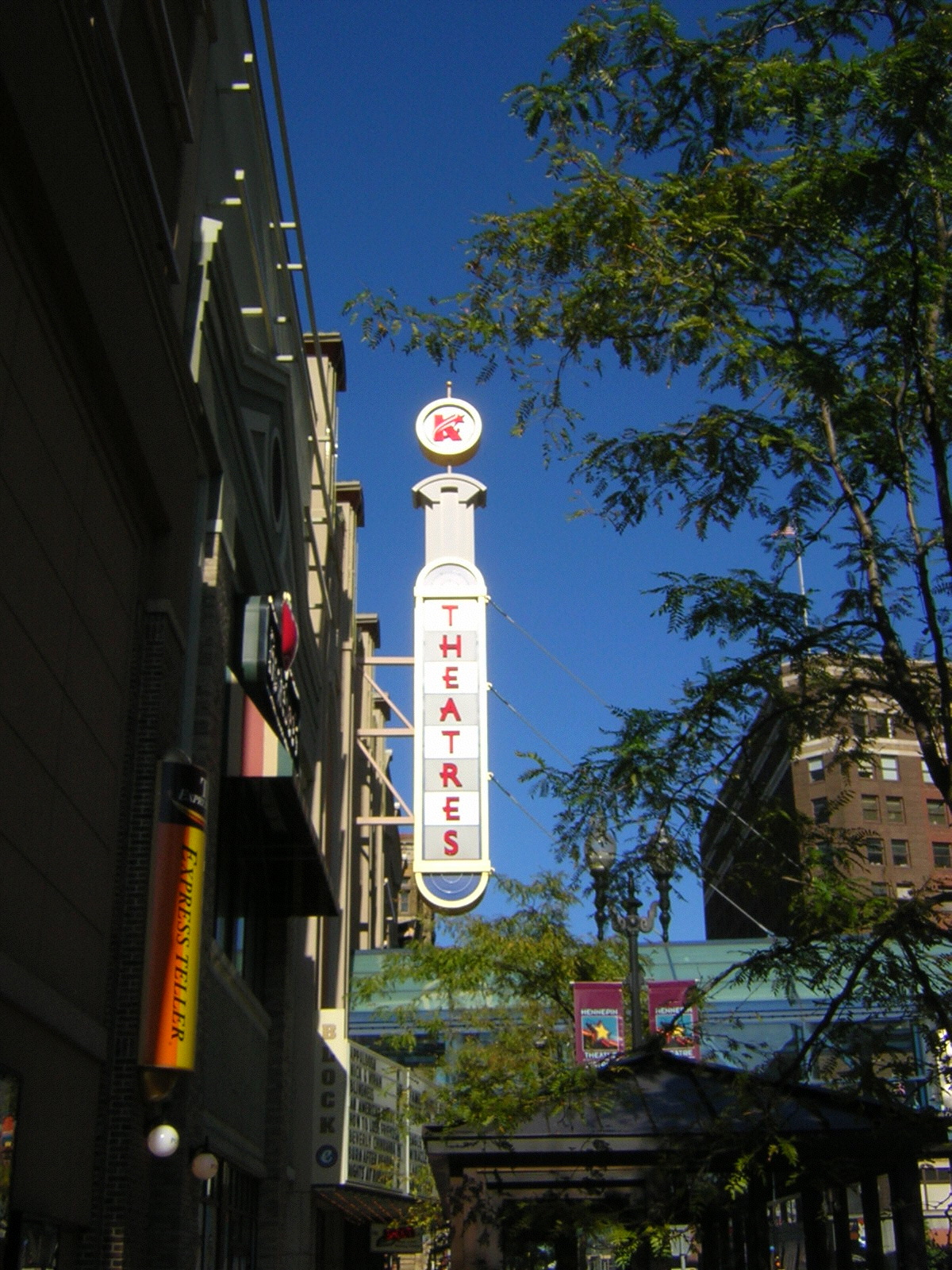
Kerasotes on Hennepin Avenue, Minneapolis, Minnesota

Kerasotes Showplace Theatres, LLC was an American movie theatre chain. Based in Chicago, Kerasotes Showplace Theatres, LLC was the sixth-largest movie-theatre company in North America, once operating as many as 957 screens in 95 locations in the states of California, Colorado, Illinois, Indiana, Iowa, Ohio, Minnesota, Missouri, New Jersey, and Wisconsin.

The company was founded in 1909, when Gus Kerasotes, a Greek immigrant, opened a storefront nickelodeon movie theatre in Springfield, Illinois. He and his brother, Louis G. Kerasotes, operated the theater business together for over fifty years. His four sons, George, Louis, John, and Nicholas, joined him in the business and by the 1930s, the company had one theatre.

The chain undertook a major expansion program during the 1990s and 2000s adding several hundred screens to the circuit.

In January 2008, Kerasotes acquired AGT Enterprise's Star Cinema brand. The purchase included four theatres in Wisconsin and two in Iowa, which retained the Star Cinema name.

On November 20, 2009, Kerasotes opened the first theater in its newly-created premium theater brand, Showplace ICON, in Minnesota. It would soon be followed by a second location in Chicago the following month.

On Tuesday, January 19, 2010, Kerasotes Showplace Theatres, LLC announced that they signed a definitive agreement to sell most of the assets to AMC Entertainment, Inc., combining the nation's second and sixth largest movie theatre chains.

On Tuesday, May 25, 2010, the $275 million sale between Kerasotes Theatres and AMC Entertainment, Inc. was completed.

Kerasotes Showplace Theatres was then managed by the third generation of the founding family with Tony Kerasotes as chief executive officer and Dean Kerasotes as chief operating officer. It operated six theaters located in the Seaport District in Boston, Chicago's South Loop, the Minneapolis suburb of St. Louis Park, Mountain View, California, Santa Clara, California at Westfield Valley Fair, and in the Harmon Meadow development in Secaucus, New Jersey. On June 21, 2024 ShowPlace ICON sold its Secaucus location to Regal Cinemas and its St. Louis Park location to Marcus Theatres. It then discontinued operations effective on June 30, 2024.
