= Stevens Creek Boulevard =

Throughfare in California, United States

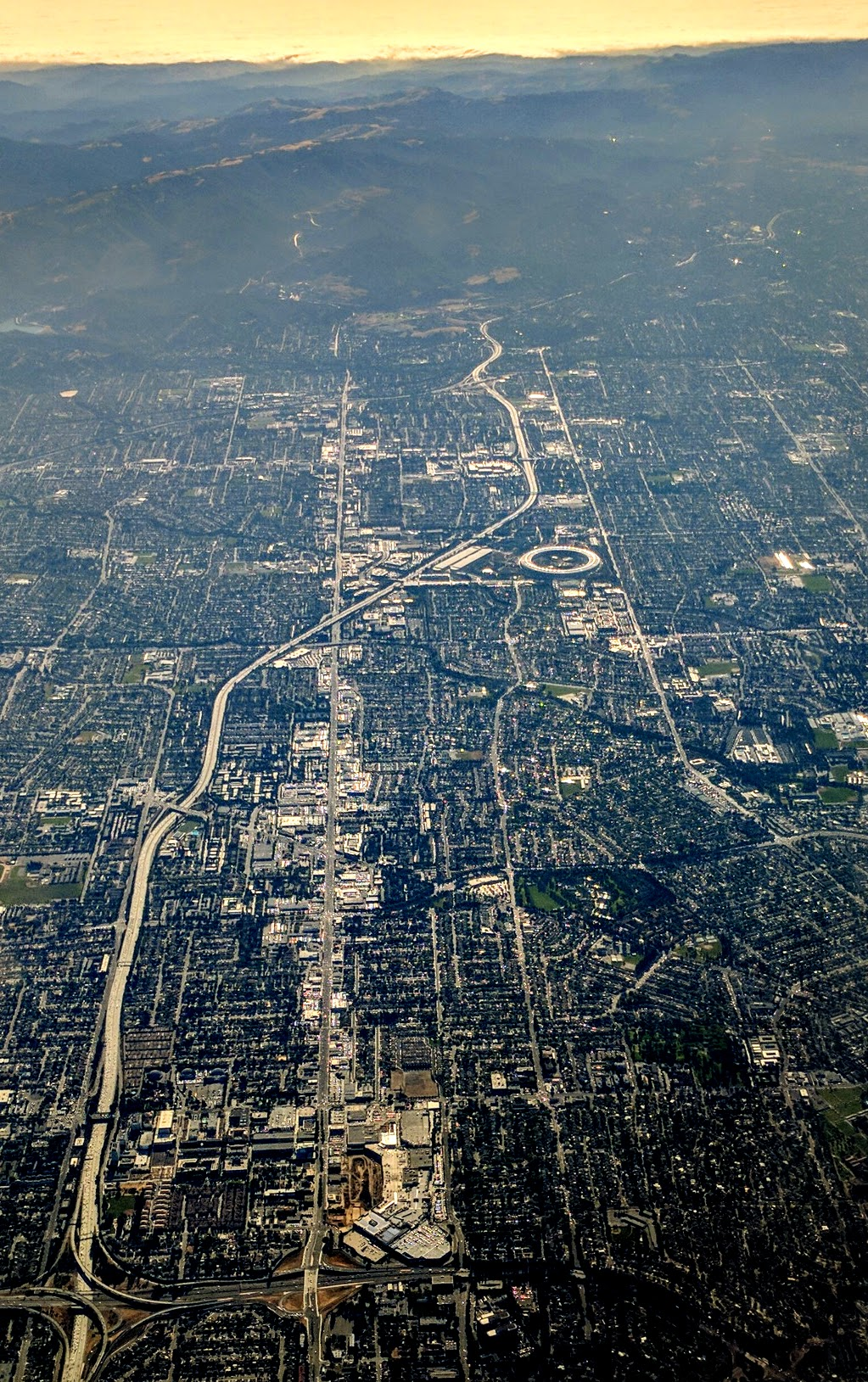
- The San Carlos Street/Stevens Creek Boulevard corridor with Apple Park on the top right.
- Length: 8.1 mi (13.0 km)
- Location: Santa Clara County: San Jose; Cupertino; Santa Clara
- West end: Permanente, Santa Cruz Mountains
- Major junctions: SR 85 in Cupertino; I-280 in Santa Clara; San Tomas Expressway in San Jose; I-880 / SR 17 in San Jose
- East end: San Carlos Street, West San Carlos, San Jose

Stevens Creek Boulevard is a major thoroughfare in Santa Clara County, California, spanning from San Carlos Street, in San Jose's West San Carlos district in the east to Permanente, in the Santa Cruz Mountains west of Cupertino. It is a part of the larger Stevens Creek Boulevard/San Carlos Street corridor. Freeways that intersect it include I-880/SR 17, SR 85, and I-280.

Stevens Creek is the primary boulevard in West San Jose and the West Valley, running between San Jose's Santana Row, an upscale shopping district, and Westfield Valley Fair, one of the largest shopping malls in the United States. The boulevard is the central artery of two of San Jose's future urban villages: Stevens Creek and Santana Row.
