= Santana Row =

- Neighborhood of San Jose
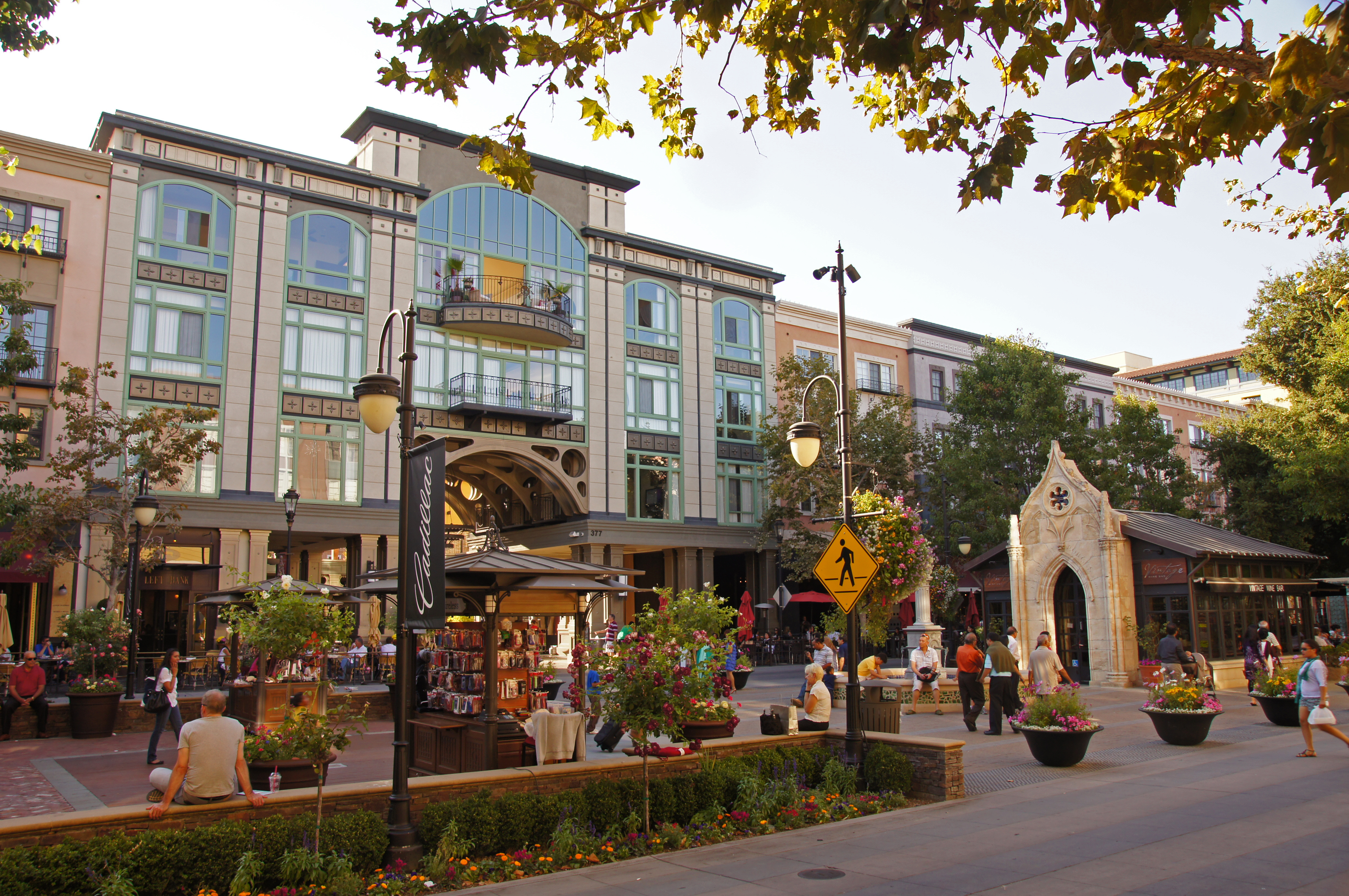
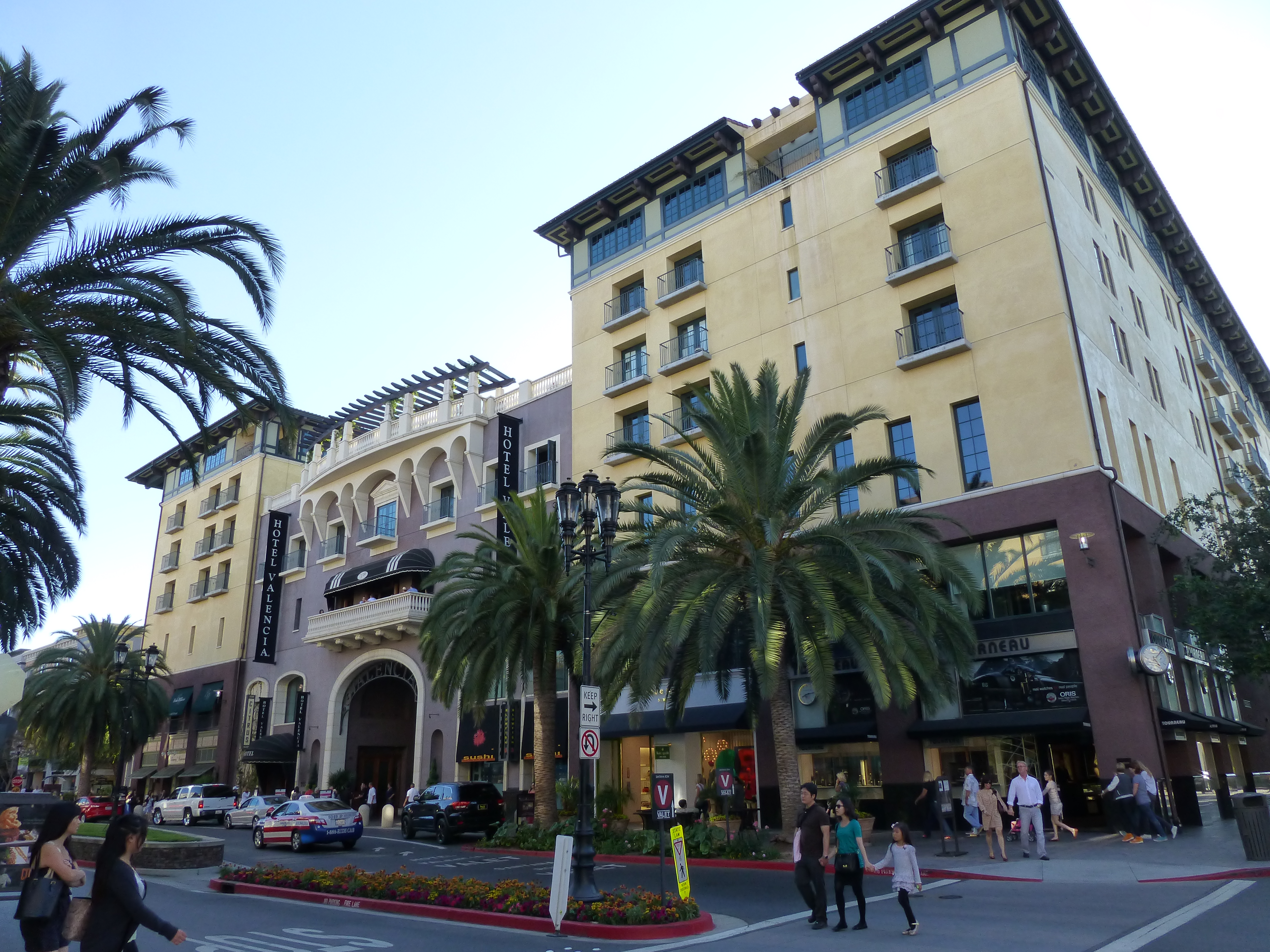
- Santana Row Park (top) and the Hotel Valencia (bottom).

- Location within San Jose
- Coordinates: 37.320278°N 121.947778°W
- Country: United States
- State: California
- County: Santa Clara County
- Cities: San Jose
- Named for: Frank M. Santana (San Jose City Planning Commissioner)
- Website: Official Website

Santana Row is an upscale residential and commercial district of the Winchester neighborhood in West San Jose in San Jose, California. Santana Row is intersected by Stevens Creek Boulevard, a major thoroughfare, and close to local landmarks like Westfield Valley Fair and the Winchester Mystery House.

== History ==
Santana Row derives its name from Frank M. Santana, who served on San Jose's planning commission in the 1950s, who is also the namesake for the area's Frank M. Santana Park. The site was previously a Town and Country Village shopping center, which was the site of the first Chuck E. Cheese's Pizza Time Theatre from May 1977 to February 1985.

On August 19, 2002, during construction, the largest building at Santana Row (Building 7, "Santana Heights") caught fire. Embers caused at least 15 smaller fires nearby, and a nearby apartment complex had 39 units destroyed, resulting in 132 people losing their homes. It was the largest structure fire in San Jose's history, with damage estimated at $129 million.

The 42-acre "village within a city" was developed as a luxury, mixed residential and shopping district between 2001–2002, for a cost of $450 million and was at the time regarded as "the most ambitious project of its kind in the United States". In 2010, it was called "an arguably successful mixed-use development".

Santana Row continued to expand in 2016. A population of 24,196 live within a one-mile radius of Santana Row.

=== Awards ===
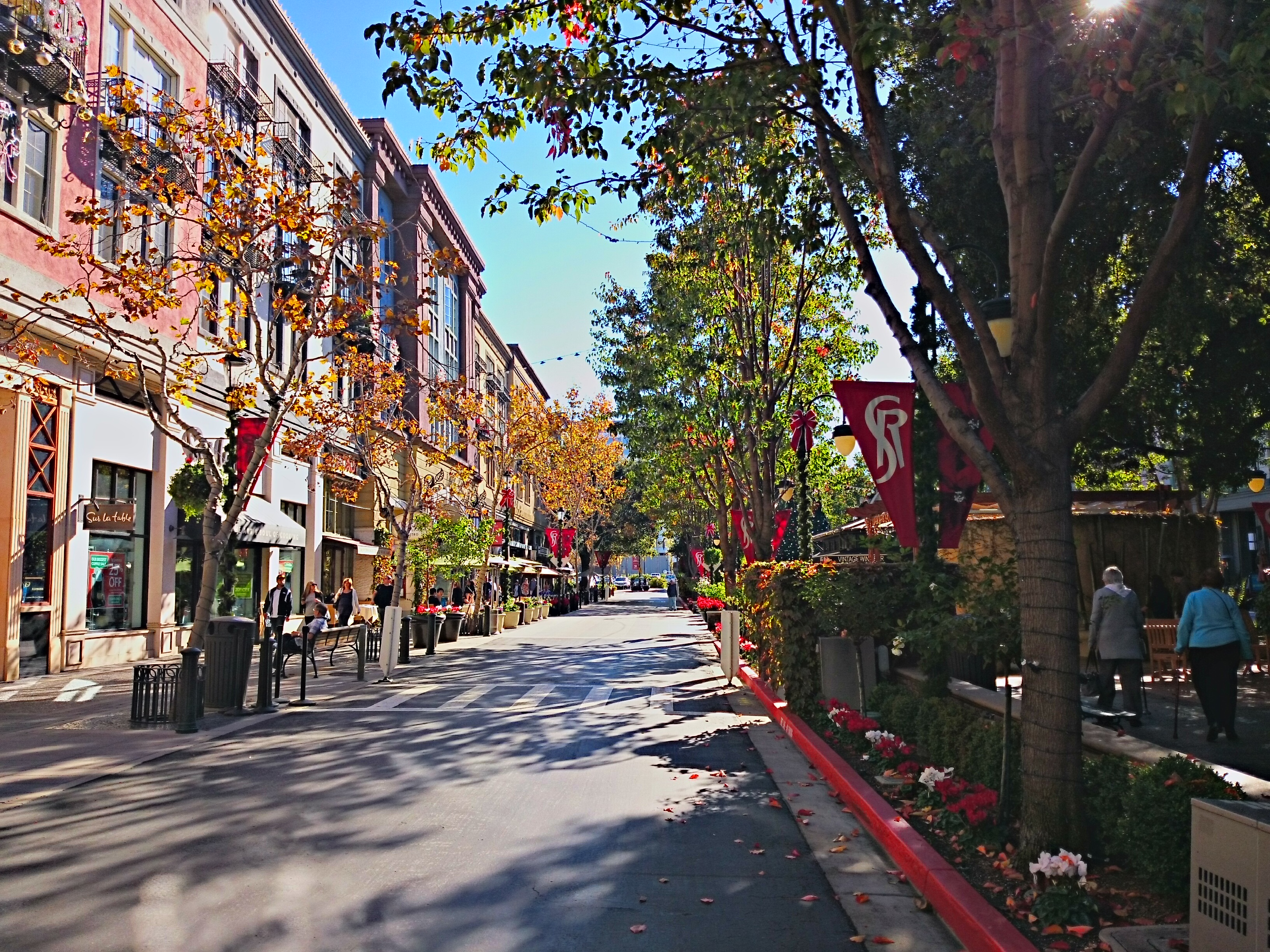
Tree-lined commercial streets characterize the district.

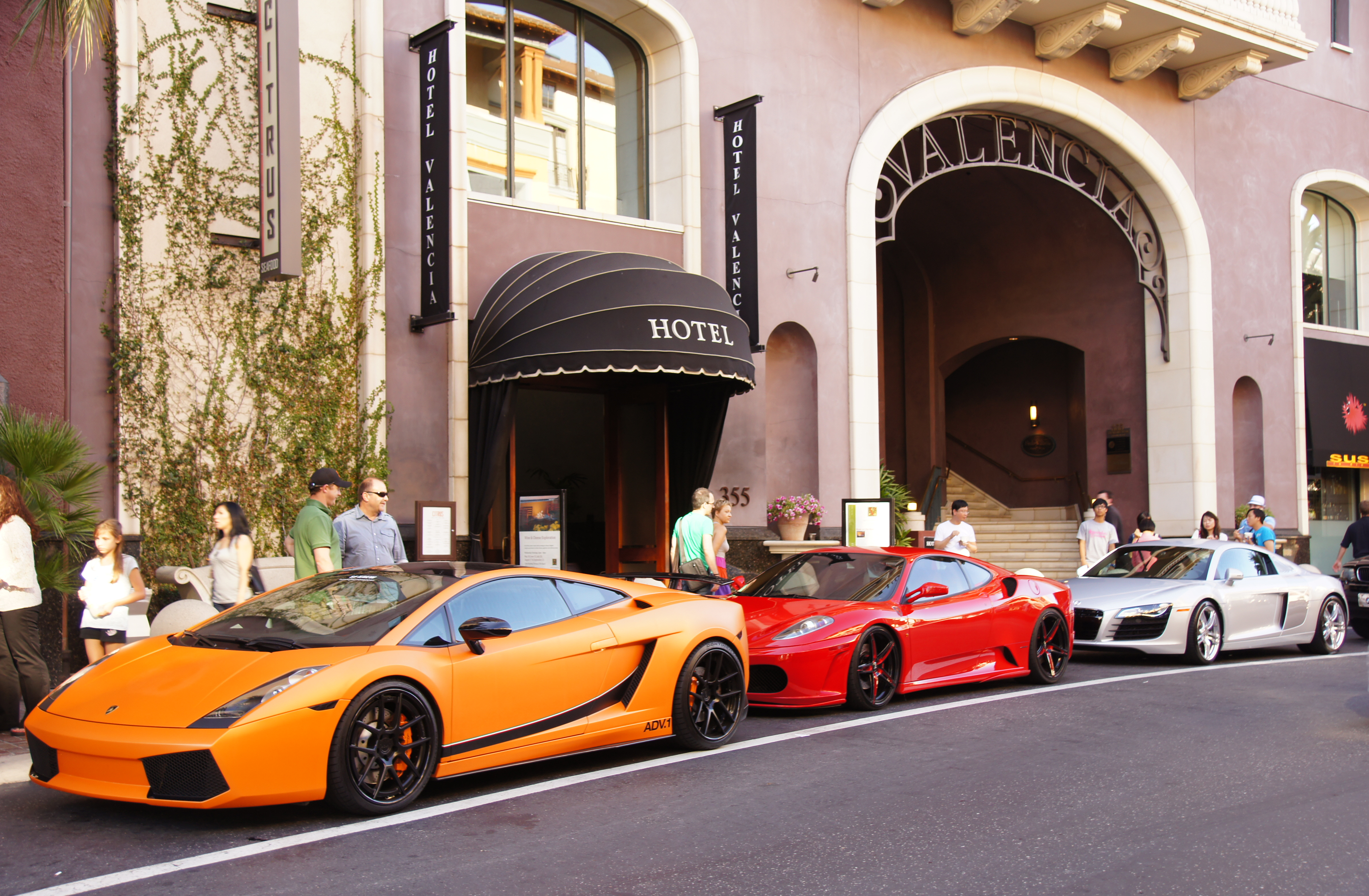
Exotic cars at the Hotel Valencia

The collaborative design effort earned Santana Row two major awards, the CELSOC Engineering Excellence Award in 2004, and Builder Magazine's Project of the Year in 2003.

The design team, including SB Architects, BAR Architects, Steinberg Architects and landscape architects The SWA Group and April Philips Design Works, worked on behalf of the project developers, Federal Realty Investment Trust.

== Economy ==
Santana Row is home to a small tech hub of companies, including Cisco, Splunk, NetApp, BlueJeans, Experian, Federal Realty Investment Trust, and AvalonBay Communities, among others.

Santana Row offers a mix of brand name shops, local boutiques, restaurants, 36 establishments serving food, nine spas and salons, a theater, and a hotel.

Several large-scale anchor retailers line the property's frontage on Stevens Creek Boulevard.

== Parks ==
- Valencia Park
- Santana Row Park
- Frank M. Santana Park
