= O'Connor Hospital =

- Santa Clara County Health System

- Shown in California

Geography
- Location: 2105 Forest Ave., San Jose, California, United States
- Coordinates: 37.3279°N 121.9385°W

Organization
- Network: Santa Clara County Health System

History
- Founded: 1889; 137 years ago

Links
- Website: och.scvh.org
- Lists: Hospitals in California

O'Connor Hospital is a hospital in San Jose, California, part of the Santa Clara County Health System. Located in the West San Carlos neighborhood of San Jose, O'Connor Hospital is one of the oldest hospitals in Santa Clara County, founded in 1889.

== History ==
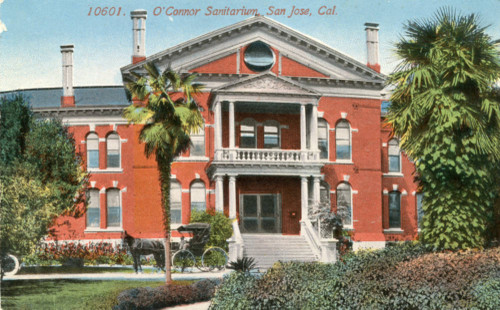
The former O'Connor Sanitarium, erected in 1888 and designed by architect Theodore Lenzen. It was demolished in 1955, after the hospital moved to its present location.

O'Connor Hospital was founded in 1889, and was the first hospital in Santa Clara County, California. O'Connor Hospital was built by Judge Myles P. O'Connor and his wife, Amanda. The original hospital was built on 15 acres (6.1 ha) of property on the corner of West San Carlos Street between Meridian Ave and Race Street.

The O'Connors were very well known as being benefactors of many charitable organizations. The O'Connors' first thoughts were to build an elderly home, however, the demands of the community at that time was for a hospital. Patrick Riordan, Archbishop of San Francisco, suggested that a hospital should be built as “a sanitarium for the sick and a home for the aged”.

The area where the sanitarium was built had been open orchard and farm land prior to the sanitariums construction; as such the sanitarium was surrounded by fourteen acres of beautiful grounds surrounded the sanitarium limiting the possibility of any adjacent structure crowding close enough to interfere with the grounds. The spacious grounds were tastefully laid out in lawns and orchard, orange plot and pinery. The grounds were bisected by numerous walkways and driveways, offering opportunities for exercise and recreation alike.

The substantial brick buildings, were grouped in architectural harmony, comprise a main building, two wings, chapel, kitchen, laundry, power house and stables. Isolated from these, stood the Isolation Building for contagious diseases. Numerous sheltered porches, a solarium, and a garden pavilion enable the convalescent to enjoy the benefits of the outdoor air. All the buildings are well lighted and ventilated.

The different departments are completely equipped, each to meet its own special needs. They comprise the surgical, medical, obstetrical, X-ray and electro-therapeutic departments, a clinical laboratory and pharmacy, and the isolation building for the care of contagious diseases.

The sanitarium was especially equipped for the care of surgical cases. The operating rooms were as complete and up-to-date in arrangement and equipment as it was possible to make them at the time, and the rooms were sunny and well lit. Owing to the favorable location of the Institution, the ideal climate, and extensive grounds, its facilities for the best treatment were thought to be ideal for the patients; two large wards for male and female patients were maintained and a smaller ward was available for chronic cases. In addition to these there was also a children's ward with special attention being paid to their needs.

Extensive improvements were made in the obstetrical division of the hospital. In addition to the private rooms, a newly remodeled and equipped ward has been arranged. Adjoining this is the delivery room with interior finish, furnishings, and equipment planned to provide every convenience for the physician and safeguard for the patient. The nursery, with its row of basket-beds, open grate fireplace and sanitary tubs, is ideally arranged.

The department of electro-therapeutics and radiography has been fully developed and equipped with costly paraphernalia and will prove of the utmost value in facilitating the diagnosis and treatment of various diseases and injuries. The equipment is of the very highest standard and latest design. The X-ray department has been enlarged and transferred to a suite of rooms in the surgical annex, where its convenience will be greatly increased.

Special apparatus consisting of a Kelly-Koett eye localizer for foreign bodies, a bullet, or foreign body localizes, a Roentgen stereoscope, and numerous minor accessories, all tend to enhance the value of this department. The electro-therapeutic room has a complete set of equipment for the use of electricity as a medicinal agent. An elaborate Wappler cabinet furnishes all varieties of the electric current. A pneumo massage apparatus is included. Special diagnostic instruments, electrically illuminated, of the latest approved models, facilitate the diagnosis of the diseases of all accessible organs and tissues. A large Victor eye magnet for the extraction of foreign bodies has also been installed.

The chemical and pathological laboratory has proved to be of great value to the hospital and the attending physicians. A complete equipment of all the apparatus, chemicals, and biological supplies necessary for modern analytical, bacteriological and pathological work is at the service of the attending physicians who desire to avail themselves of its advantages for the benefit of their patients or for original research work.

An isolation building was erected and opened for service during the year 1910. All highly contagious and infectious diseases—measles, scarlet fever, diphtheria, erysipelas, etc.--cannot be admitted or treated in the wards and rooms of the general hospital, and through lack of such a building many persons have been deprived of the facilities offered for the scientific conduct and efficient quarantine of such diseases. The isolation building was erected through the beneficence of Mr. and Mrs. C. D. Blaney, and is conducted by the Sisters of Charity of St. Vincent de Paul. Surrounded by its own grounds it is entirely separated from the main hospital buildings. The interior arrangement is such that no mutual exposure of the patients with different contagious or infectious diseases is liable.

The sanitarium was not endowed, the only income being from pay patients. Its ministrations were not reserved for any one class of patients and offered its services to everyone who needed assistance, irrespective of creed. The physicians of San Jose of all approved schools of medicine, patronized the sanitarium, thus assisting very materially toward its support by helping defer costs. In the early 1920s the sanitarium was accommodating from seventy-five to ninety patients daily.

In connection with the sanitarium there was a training school for nurses. This school was incorporated and operated according to the best methods of the day, with the usual curriculum of the general hospital training school having been adopted. Lectures were delivered semi-weekly by the training school staff and there were semi-weekly classes conducted by the superintendent.

In 1953, O'Connor Hospital moved to its present site on Forest Avenue, the original hospital was subsequently demolished 2 years later in 1955.

As of 2020, O'Connor Hospital is a 358-bed acute care facility offering inpatient and outpatient medical, surgical and specialty programs to more than 1 million residents of San Jose.

== Operations ==
The Sisters of Charity of St. Vincent de Paul, at the invitation of the donors and suggestion of Archbishop Riordan, took possession/operation of the facility on March 19, 1889, and continued overseeing the operations of the hospital until 2002. In 2002, O'Connor Hospital became a member of the Daughters of Charity Health System until late 2019.

At that time, October 2019, Daughters of Charity announced they would be shedding the hospital for financial reasons and in December 2015, O'Connor Hospital became part of Verity Health System, a non-profit, non-religious health care system that sought to build on the rich legacy left by the Daughters of Charity Health System.

Santa Clara County acquired the hospital, from Veritas over the objections of state Attorney General Xavier Becerra in a deal that closed on February 28, 2019. The transfer of operations was a result of a $235 million bankruptcy Verity Health System's, the hospitals operator at the time, was facing. The hospitals were already receiving significant taxpayer assistance, at one point receiving an annual subsidy of $250 million; that subsidy later shrunk to $80 million auditing to the hospital financial difficulties. Verity, a nonprofit operator of six California hospitals, had bankruptcy protection in August 2018.

O'Connor Hospital is now part of the County of Santa Clara Health System, a collection of Santa Clara county owned and operated medical facilities that offer medical care throughout Santa Clara County. The Health System includes the Behavioral Health Services Department, Public Health Department, Santa Clara Valley Medical Center hospital and clinics, O'Connor Hospital, St. Louise Regional Hospital, Emergency Medical Services Agency, Custody Health Services Department, and Valley Health Plan. The hospitals and clinics are operated by the County under a consolidated license from the California Department of Public Health. The Hospitals and Clinics Delivery System is part of the broader County of Santa Clara Health System.
