= Westfield Valley Fair =

Coordinates: 37.325095°N 121.942508°W

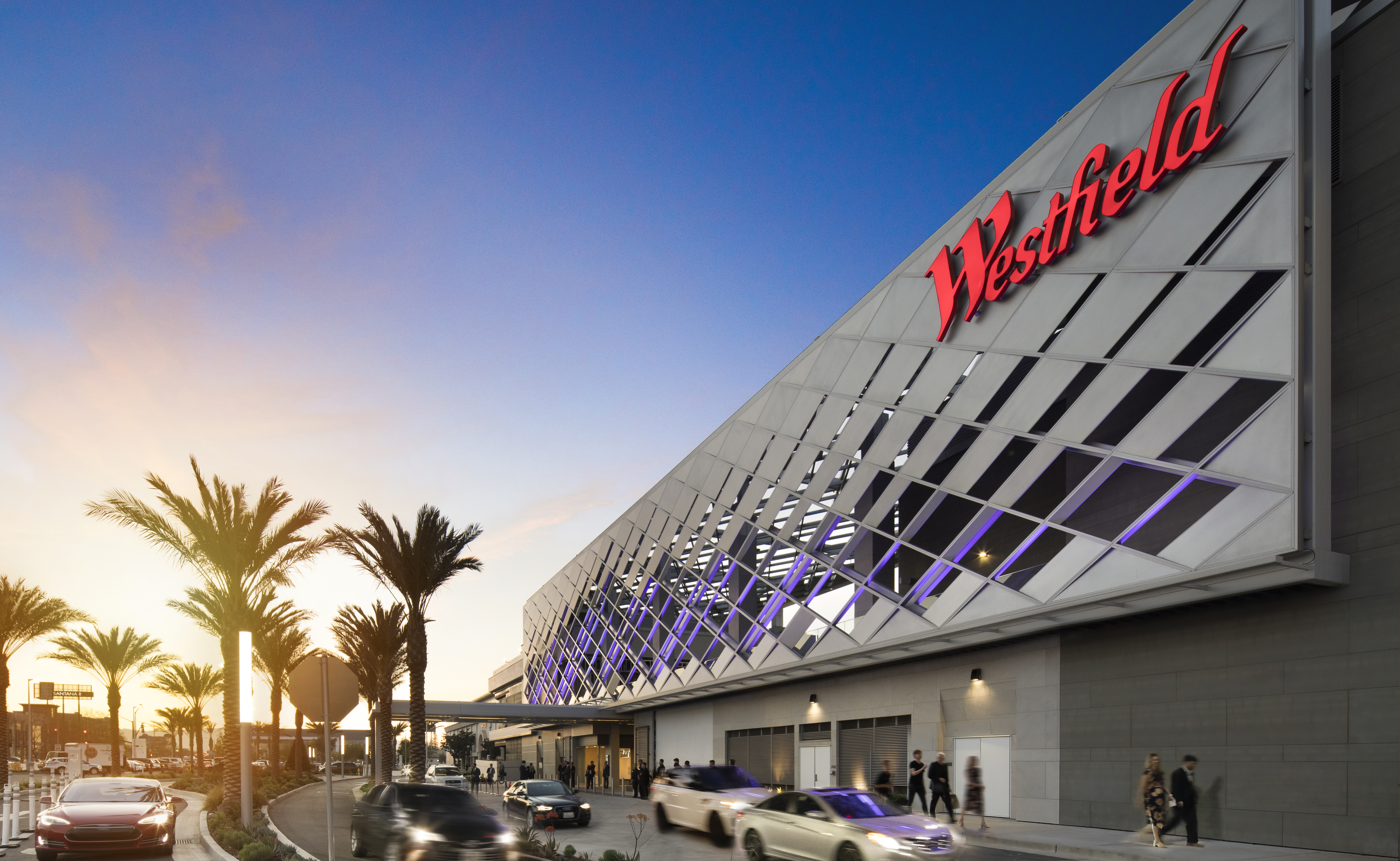
- South valet entrance
- Location: San Jose, California, U.S.
- Address: 2855 Stevens Creek Boulevard
- Opened: 1958; 68 years ago
- Developer: The Hahn Company
- Manager: Unibail-Rodamco-Westfield
- Owner: Unibail-Rodamco-Westfield
- Num. of stores: 236
- Num. of anchor tenants: 4
- Floor area: 2,200,000 sq ft (200,000 m^{2})
- Floors: 2 (3 in Bloomingdale's, Nordstrom and Macy’s)
- Parking: 8,500
- Website: www.westfield.com/valleyfair/

Westfield Valley Fair, commonly known as Valley Fair (the original name), is a prominent shopping mall in San Jose, California, United States. Valley Fair is the largest mall, by area, in Northern California and has higher sales revenue than all other malls in California, including the two in Southern California which have a larger area than Valley Fair.

Valley Fair is the fourteenth largest shopping mall in the United States. It is officially located on Stevens Creek Boulevard in the city of Santa Clara, California, although all of its eastern half and some of its western half is physically located in the city of San Jose. The mall features Macy's, Macy's Men's and Home Store, Nordstrom, and Bloomingdale's.

Valley Fair consists of 214 stores, including the only Balenciaga store in Northern California, and 58 dining options, such as Eataly and Din Tai Fung.

== History ==
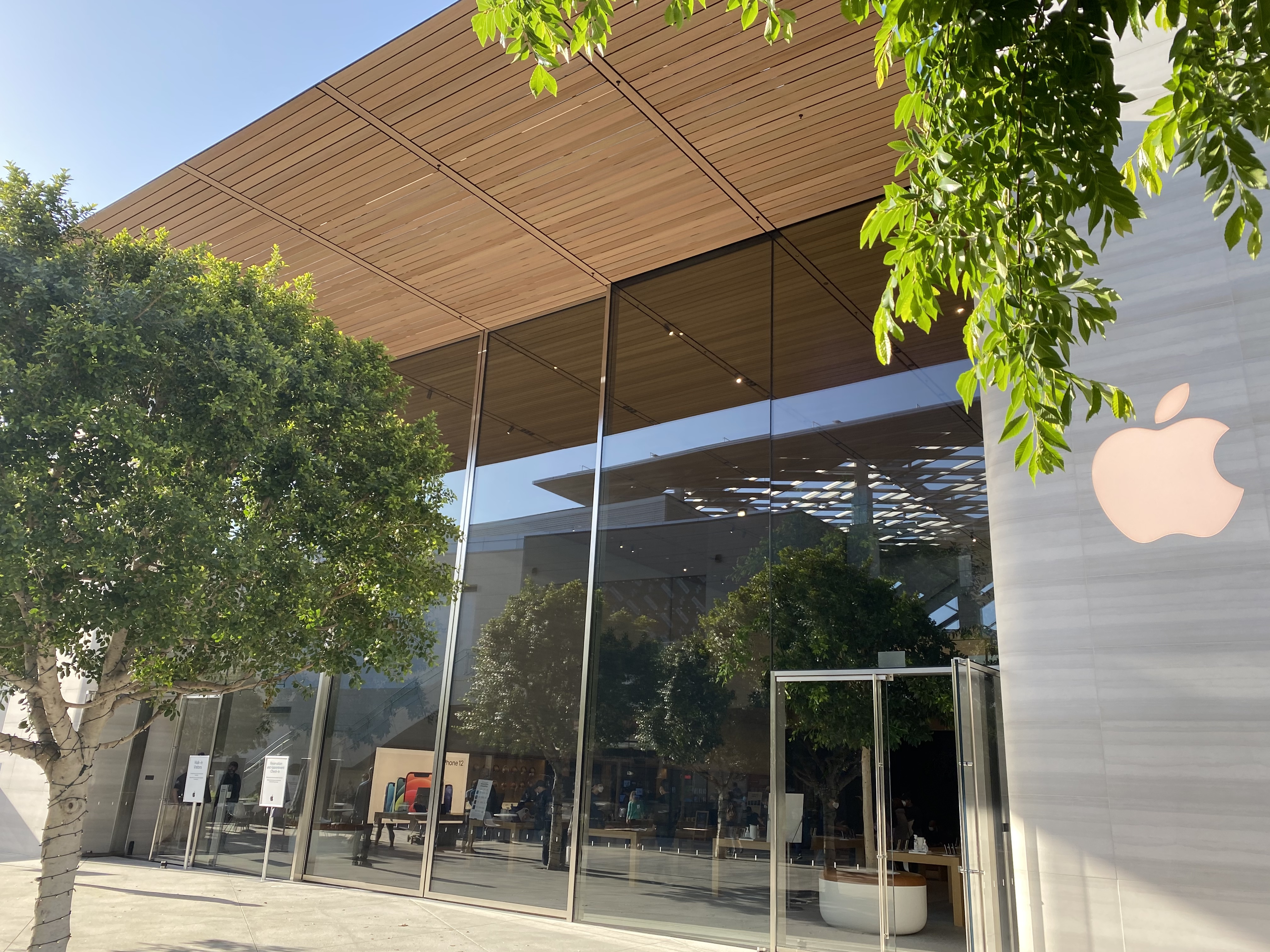
Flagship Apple store

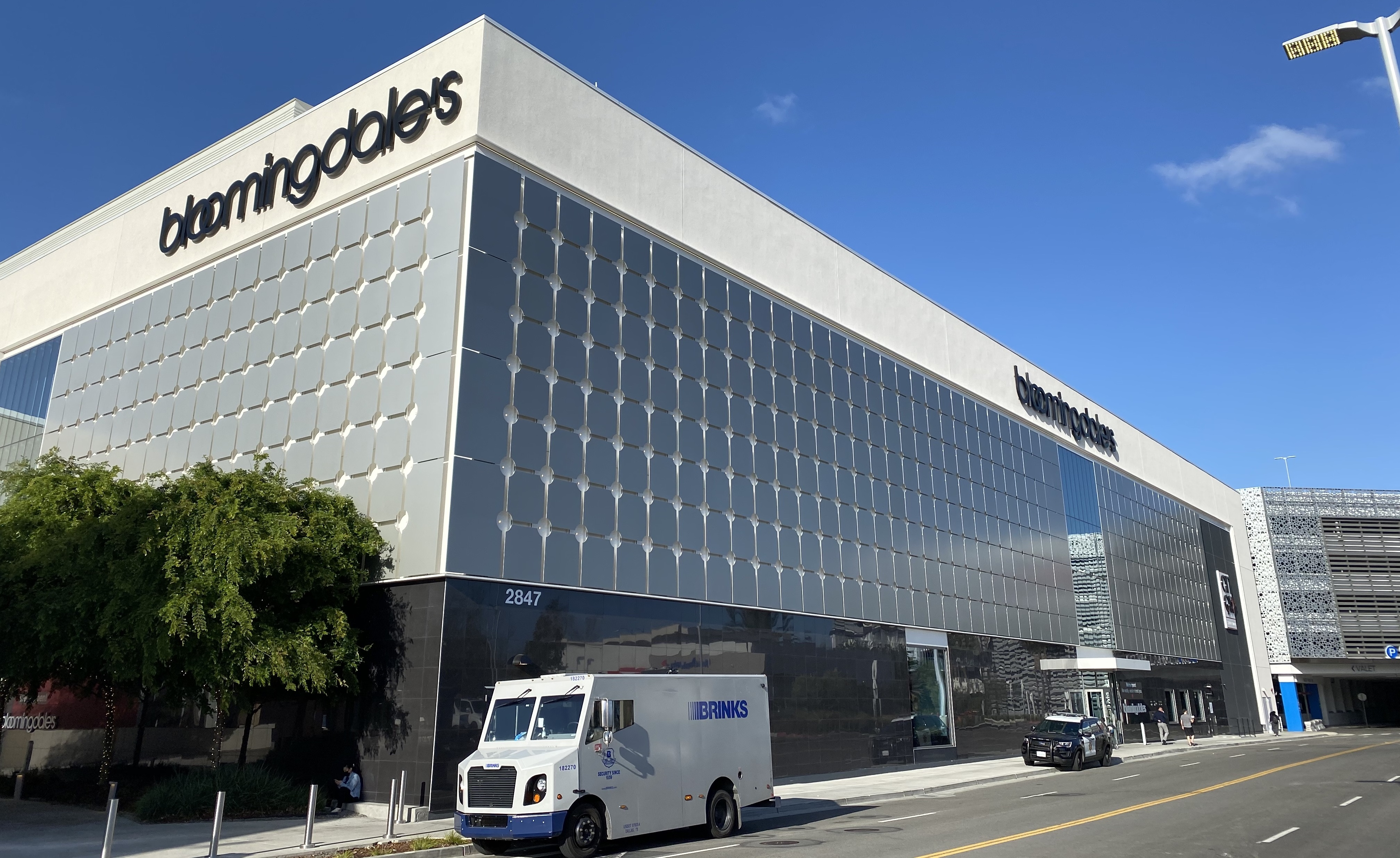
Bloomingdale's

In 1958, the original Valley Fair Shopping Center opened. It was confined to the eastern side of the property, in the city of San José. It was developed and anchored by Macy's, and included roughly 40 other stores including Joseph Magnin in an outdoor plaza. At the western side was another outdoor shopping center, Stevens Creek Plaza, in the city of Santa Clara. It was anchored by The Emporium and I. Magnin. For that reason, the current mall contributes sales tax revenues to both the cities of San José and Santa Clara, and is regulated by both city governments.

In 1986, both centers were acquired and merged into one two-level enclosed mall by the Hahn Company, creating one of the most successful shopping centers in the country, called simply "Valley Fair", the name by which it has been universally known ever since.

Later, in 1987, Nordstrom joined.

In 1992, I. Magnin closed its store. The former I. Magnin building housed a succession of tenants, its final one being Sports Authority, before being demolished.

In 1996, the former Emporium store became a second Macy's location, housing Macy's Men's & Home Store.

In 1998, Westfield America, Inc., a predecessor of the Westfield Group, acquired Valley Fair jointly from Hahn. Westfield would buy out Valley Fair from Rouse in 1999 and bring in an institutional investment partner to share its investment risk in this high-profile property. In 1998, the property was renamed Westfield Shoppingtown Valley Fair. Westfield discontinued the "Shoppingtown" moniker in 2005.

In 2001, the mall commenced a US$165 million two-phase expansion project (equivalent to $300 million in 2025), which began with the addition of a new second-level Dining Terrace, 80 new stores, three multi-level parking garages, and the relocation of the property's Nordstrom store to a new three-level, 230,000-square-foot (21,367.7 m^{2}) store to the northwest of its original store. Phase Two brought the redevelopment of the former Nordstrom store and food court into an additional 30 stores, including a wing of shops facing the bordering Forest Avenue, and the addition of a Cheesecake Factory restaurant.

=== Expansion ===
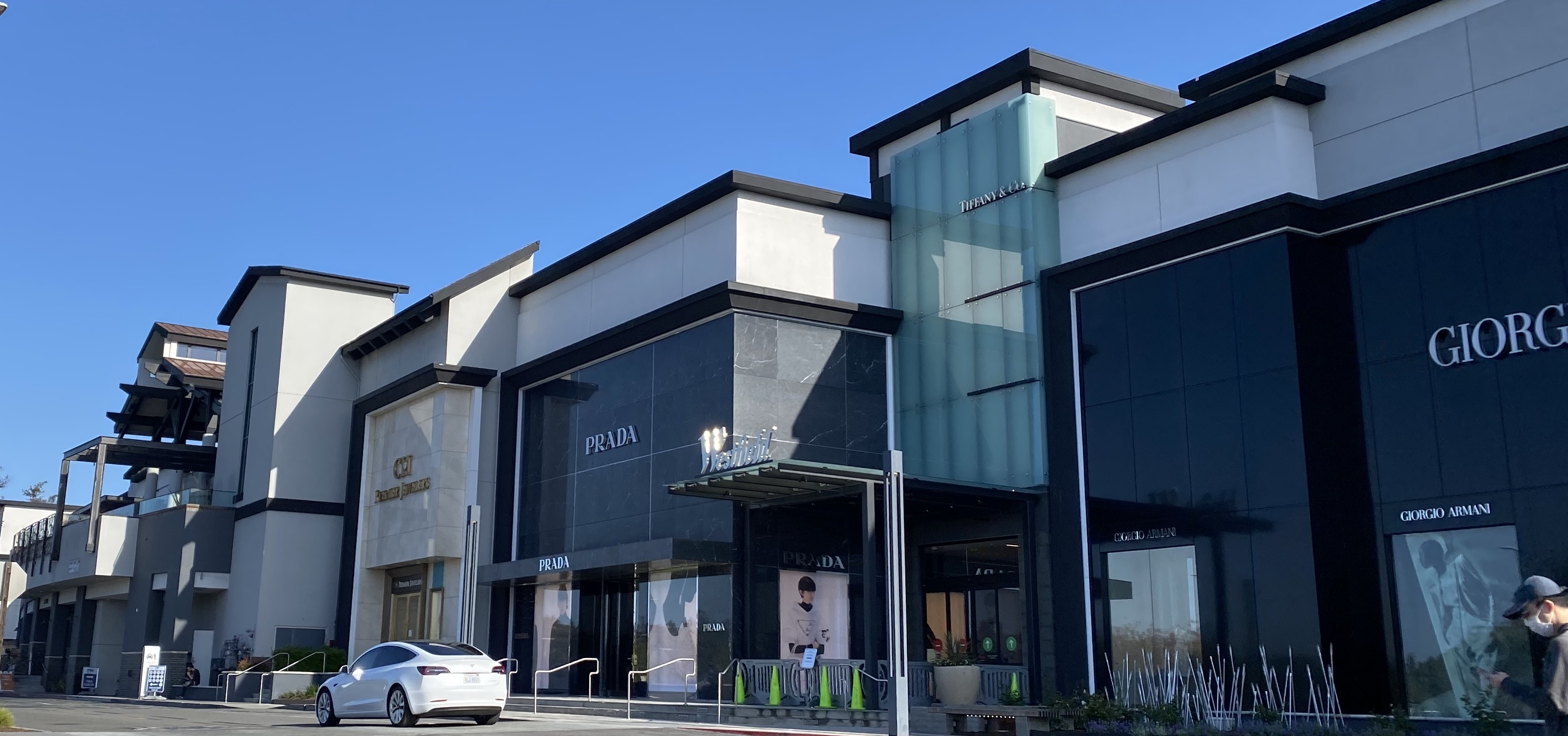
The north luxury cluster includes Cartier, Prada, and Burberry.

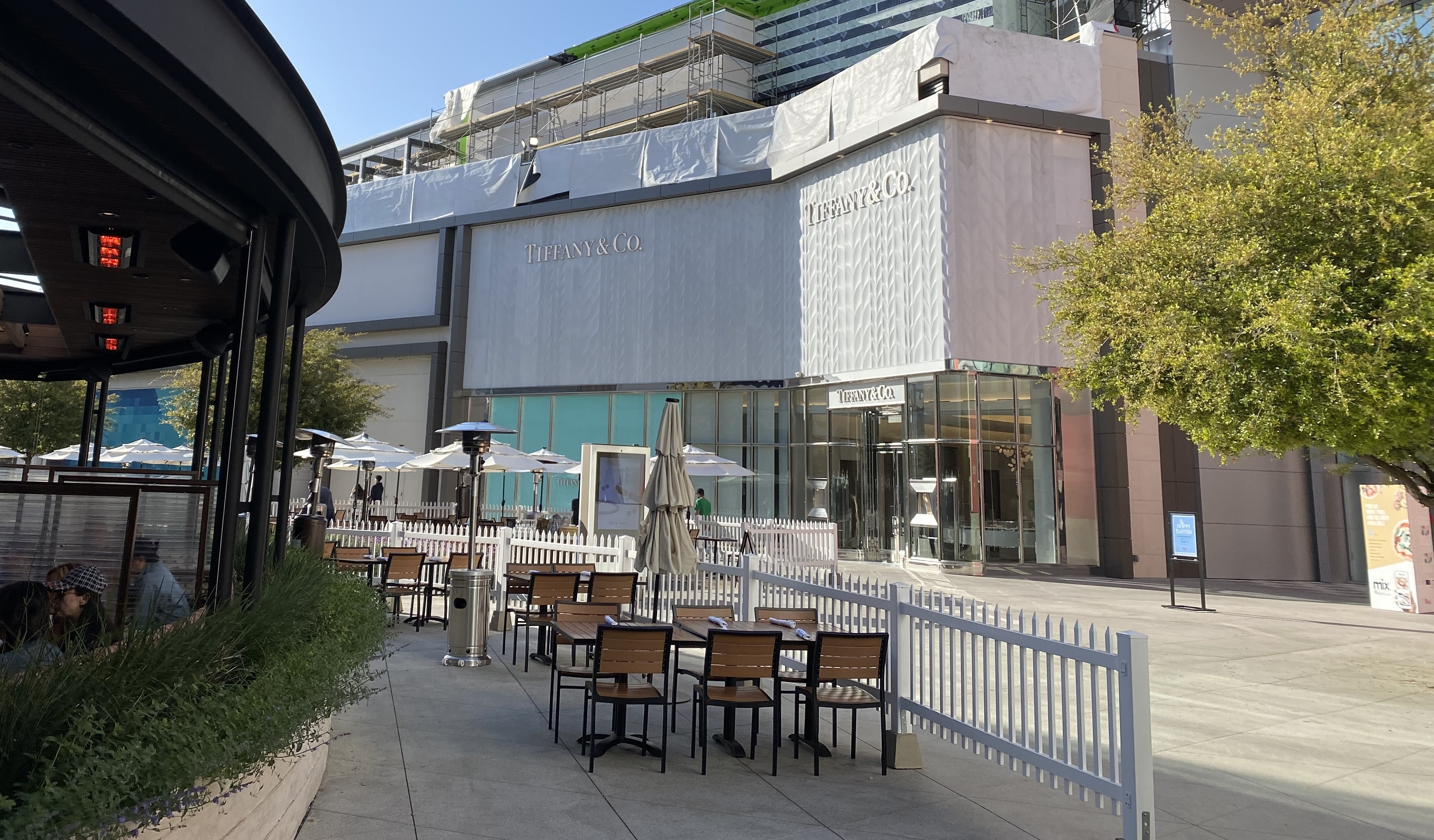
The south luxury cluster includes Tiffany & Co, Versace, and Gucci.

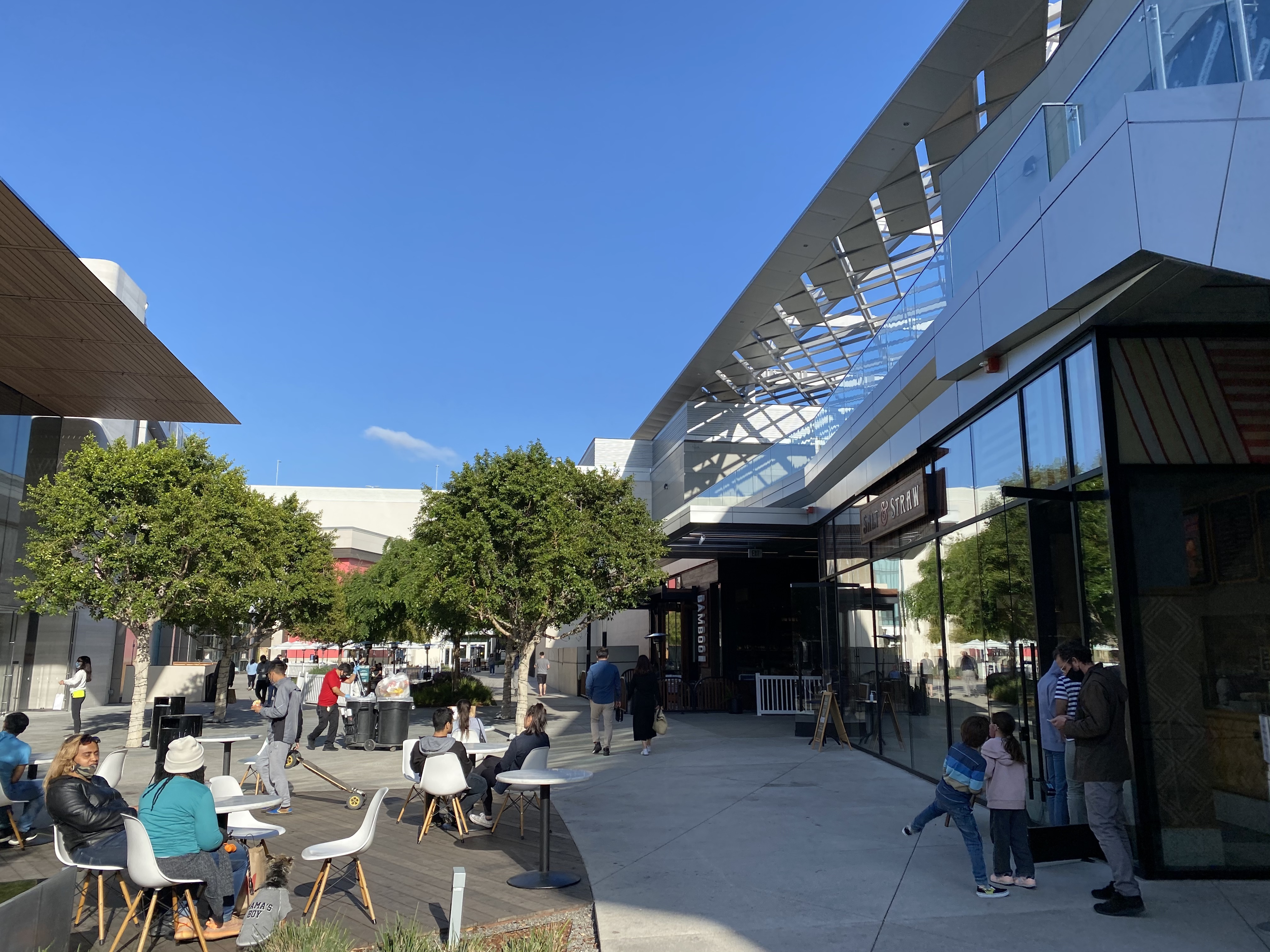
Outdoor restaurant plaza

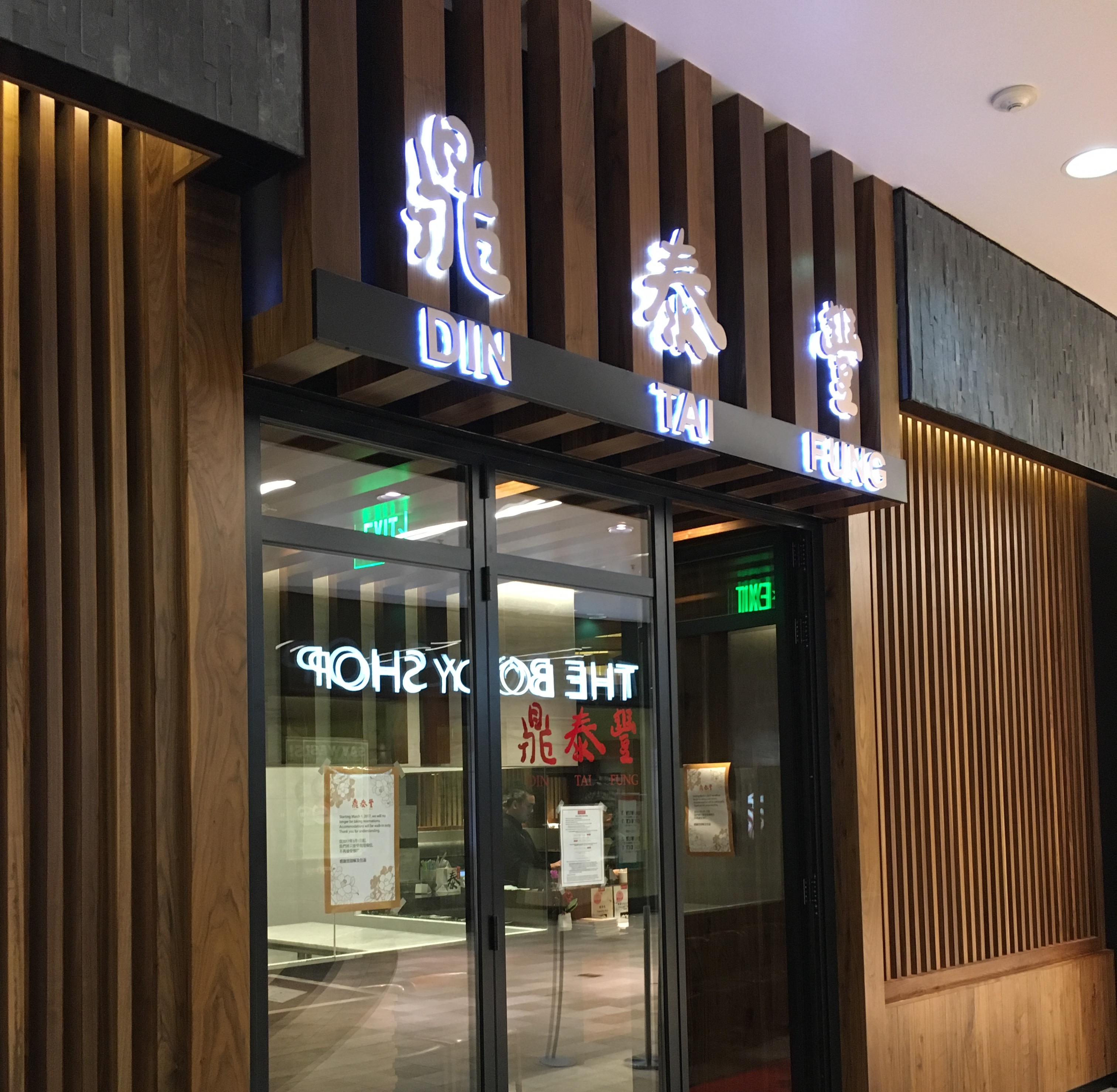
The San Jose location of Din Tai Fung, ranked as one of the world's best restaurants by The New York Times

In 2007, Westfield announced major expansion plans which would increase its gross leasable area to over 2,000,000 square feet (185,806.1 m^{2}), adding anchor stores Bloomingdale's and Neiman Marcus, 100 shops, and a 3000 space parking structure. Westfield was granted approval for the expansion by the city of San Jose in November 2007. It was to be completed by September 2011. However, the plans were postponed in May 2009 due to an ongoing recession.

In 2012, San Jose raised its minimum wage to US$10 an hour (equivalent to $14 in 2025), but Santa Clara did not, leading to what the NPR Planet Money team dubbed "A Mall Divided", where workers on one side of the mall were being paid $2 less than the other side (equivalent to $3 in 2025). A Gap clothing store located on the two city lines was required to either account for how long its employees spent in each city or raise its wages for all employees to the San Jose minimum wage; they chose to raise the wages. In 2022, the mall began charging for daily or monthly parking, which was criticized by mall employees.

In 2013, a major remodel of the center commenced, bringing the mall a revamped "Dining Terrace" with local concepts alongside national chains, and a major reshuffling of tenants. Nordstrom was extensively remodeled, adding two new restaurant concepts and a completely revamped store design. The mall's lower level Nordstrom wing was reconfigured into a "Luxury Collection", with new luxury tenants like Mulberry, Saint Laurent Paris, Bottega Veneta, Versace, Giorgio Armani, Tory Burch, Salvatore Ferragamo, and Prada joining existing tenants Louis Vuitton and Tiffany & Co.

In early 2015, Westfield unveiled a new proposal for a $1.1 billion expansion, which called for the addition of a three-level 150,000-square-foot (13,935.5 m^{2}) Bloomingdale's department store, a Showplace Icon luxury cinema, and the addition 500,022 square feet (46,453.6 m^{2}) of new interior shop space, adding over 100 new stores, including an outdoor restaurant collection fronting Stevens Creek Boulevard, and 3,000+ new parking spaces.

In 2019, the Showplace ICON cinema became the first tenant of the I. Magnin replacement building, followed by a Bowlero bowling alley, which opened in 2023.

On March 5, 2020, the expansion and Bloomingdale's had its grand opening, creating a third interior thoroughfare and an outdoor dining district. Several retailers opened in the months following the expansion, including relocated and larger Apple and Tiffany & Co. flagship retail stores, with a 45,000-square-foot (4,200 m^{2}) Eataly food hall and market planned for the wing as well. Eataly opened on June 16, 2022.

=== Pandemic ===
By 2023, the mall had fully recovered from the COVID-19 pandemic. With the opening of its new expansion, it saw sales rise to 66% over 2019 levels.

The mall's prosperity came at the expense of San Francisco's Union Square and its sibling mall Westfield San Francisco Centre to the north, which lost many retailers who either moved to or preferred to remain operating in Northern California only at Valley Fair.

In June 2024, the Showplace ICON cinema closed, after parent company Kerasotes Theatres ceased operations and closed all locations. Alamo Drafthouse took over the location and opened a theatre in June 2025.

Post-pandemic, Westfield Valley Fair has regularly become the chosen destination for many retailers' first Northern California locations or for their revamped store designs.

In fall 2026, Cider, a fast fashion retailer targeted to young adults opened their second brick-and-mortar location. The footwear brand VIVAIA opened their first Californian location. Arc'teryx opened with the Bay Area's first ReBird Service Center for repairing garments. Streetwear brand AMIRI opened its only location in the Bay Area and Ralph Lauren opened their third Bay Area location alongside Ralph's Coffee as part of their ongoing direct-to-consumer expansion plans.

== See also ==
- Bayfair Center
- List of largest shopping malls in the United States
- Unibail-Rodamco-Westfield
