= West San Carlos, San Jose =

West San Carlos
- Neighborhood of San Jose
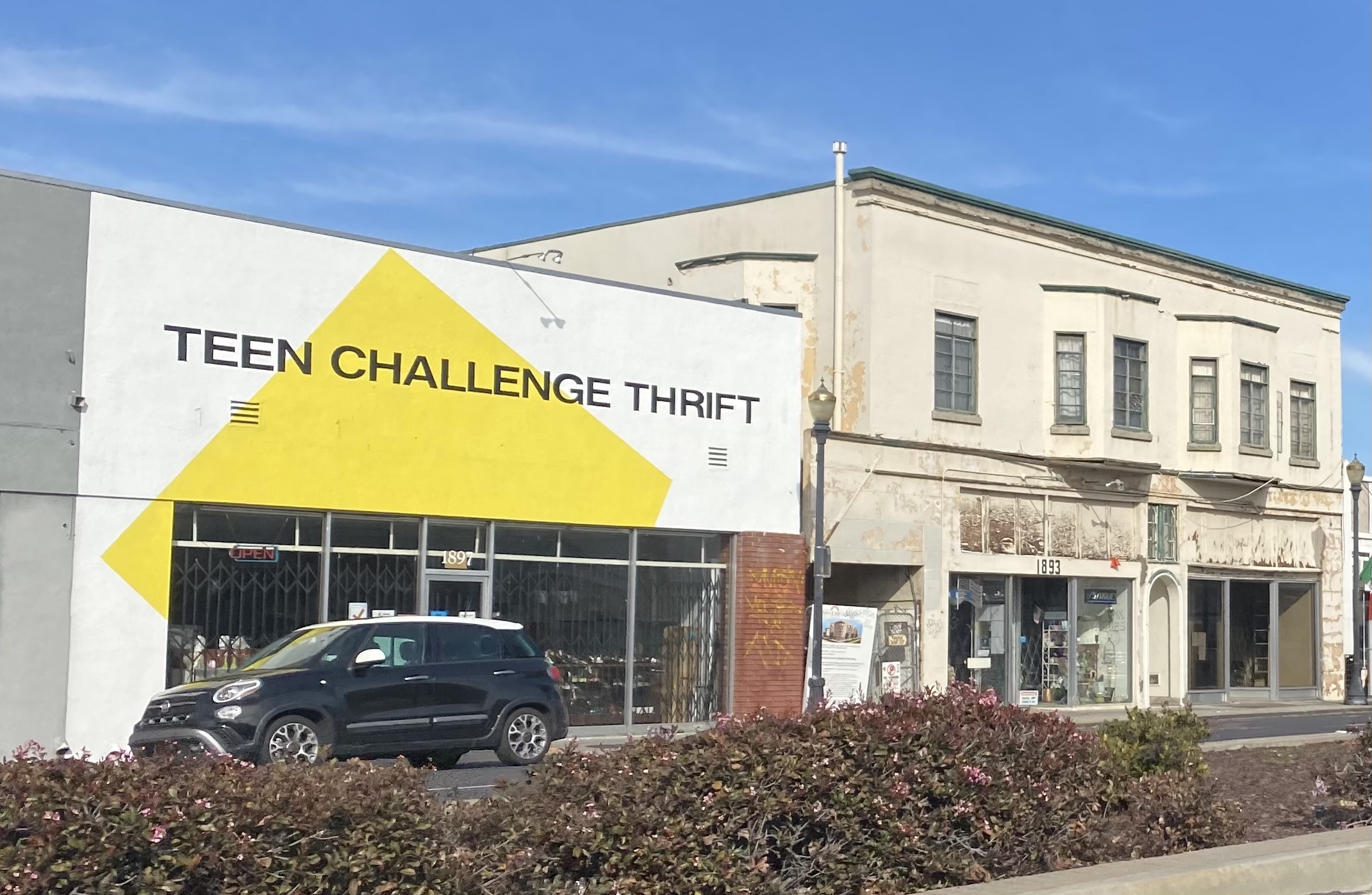

- Location within San Jose, California
- Coordinates: 37.32363°N 121.90942°W
- Country: United States
- State: California
- County: Santa Clara
- City: San Jose

West San Carlos is a neighborhood and urban village of San Jose, California, which lies to the west of Midtown San Jose and to the east of Santana Row.

== Geography ==
West San Carlos is centered on the westernmost extent of San Carlos Street.

It is bordered to the east by Midtown San Jose, the west by Santana Row, the north by Shasta Hanchett Park, and the south by Burbank. North of West San Carlos is the Diridon Station neighborhood.

== Landmarks ==
- O'Connor Hospital
