= Monta Vista, Cupertino, California =

Neighborhood in California

Coordinates: 37.32272°N 122.058017°W

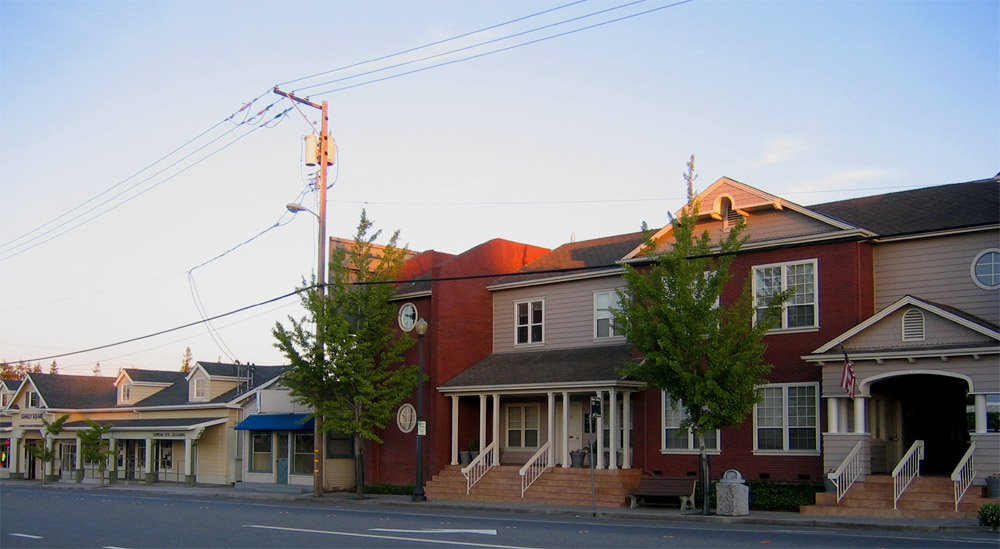
Old Monta Vista downtown

Monta Vista is an upper-income residential neighborhood in western Cupertino, California, the 11th wealthiest city with a population over 50,000 in the United States. "Monta Vista" means "mountain view" however, it is not affiliated with the nearby city of Mountain View. Monta Vista in Cupertino is loosely referred to as the neighborhood that feeds into the high school

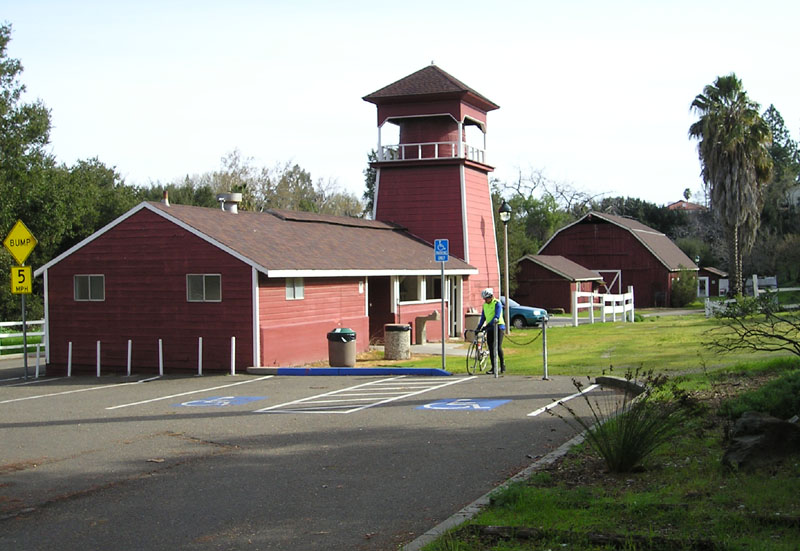
Old farm buildings are preserved at the McClellan Ranch Park.

Orchards and vineyards used to cover Monta Vista. After the 1940s, Monta Vista became the first housing tract in the Cupertino area. Residential homes then quickly replaced the orchards and vineyards.

When Cupertino decided to incorporate in 1955, Monta Vista decided at the last moment not to join the effort, remaining an unincorporated part of Santa Clara County. Over the years, Cupertino annexed pieces of Monta Vista as it was redeveloped lot by lot. By the late 1990s, only scattered pockets of unincorporated land were left in Monta Vista. Cupertino finally annexed the rest of the neighborhood in 2004.

Starting in the mid-1980s and through the 2000s, settlement by affluent Asian American families accelerated initially driven by the rise in semiconductor and PC related industries and later via the rise of software, internet and other technology sectors. Currently, over 50% the neighborhood is Asian American and has a mix of newer generation as well as long time residents. Many of Monta Vista's residents work in Silicon Valley's technology industries in scientific, managerial, or entrepreneurial positions.

Monta Vista homes are mainly detached single-family ranch-style houses ranging from 1200 to 2,800 square feet (260 m^{2}). The community also has a variety of custom built houses ranging from 3000–6,000 square feet (560 m^{2}) of living space area. Many smaller homes start from the mid $2 million, mid-size homes start from the $3 million, and larger custom homes start from the $4 million and can go up to as much as $7 million, as of the 2022 peak. However, townhouses with similar square footage are relatively less expensive, owing mainly to negligible lot sizes and the many common walls and areas.

The neighborhood is very sought-after due to its desirable location, low crime rate, and its academically high-performing schools, including Monta Vista High School and Kennedy Middle School. Monta Vista High School was ranked by Newsweek as one of the 100 top academically performing public high schools in the United States.

Attractions in Monta Vista include the Fremont Older Open Space Preserve, Monte Bello Open Space Preserve, Picchetti Ranch Open Space Preserve (next to Picchetti Brothers Winery), Blackberry Farm, Deep Cliff Golf Course, Cupertino Hills Swim and Racquet Club, Linda Vista Park, Varian Park, Monta Vista Park and Stevens Creek Reservoir. McClellan Ranch Park, located just west of Monta Vista High School, is a nature preserve and historical park formerly owned by the McClellan family. Along with John T. Doyle, this family was one of the first residents of the area. This site also preserves the original ranch, milk barns and livestock barns with animals raised by resident volunteers.

== Gallery ==
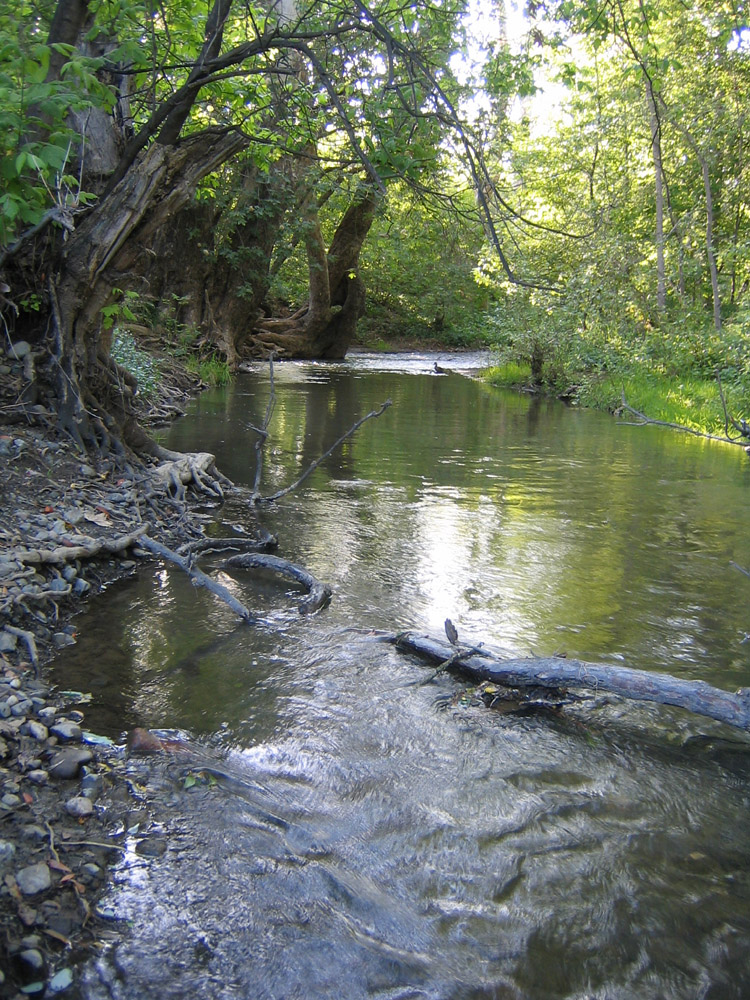
Stevens Creek flowing through the McClellan Ranch Park

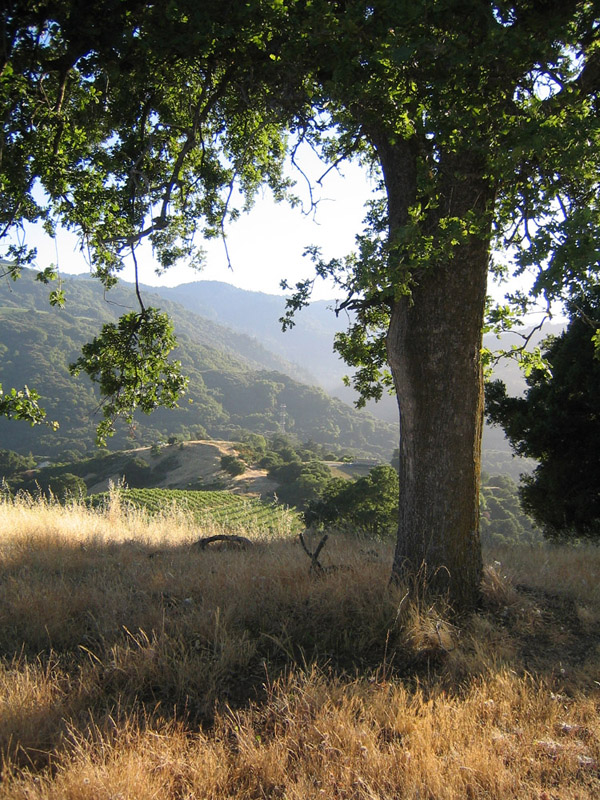
Vineyards in the Cupertino Hills

Regnart Neighborhood in Monta Vista

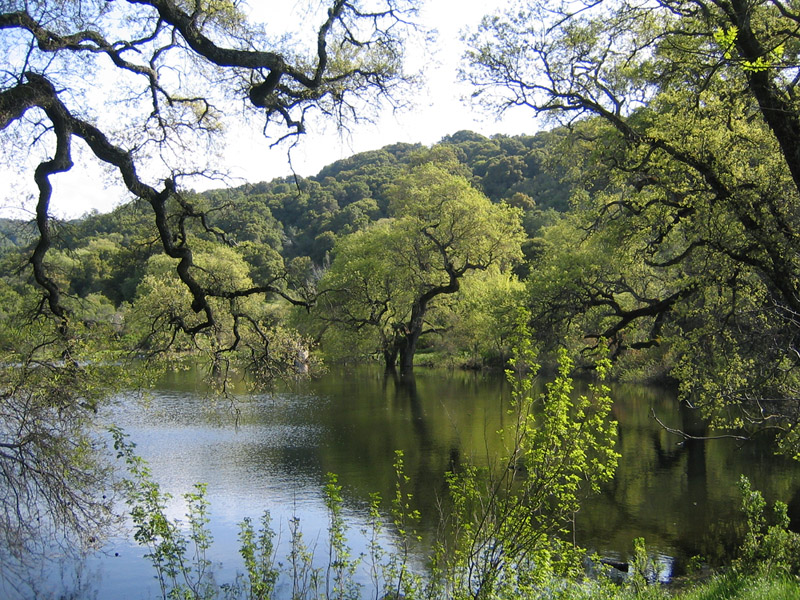
Picchetti Open Space Preserve, adjacent to Monta Vista

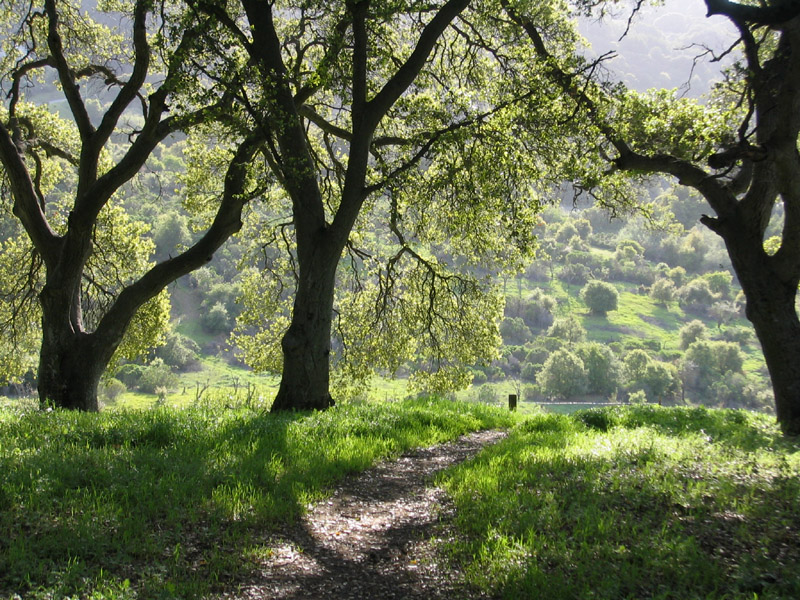
Picchetti Open Space Preserve, adjacent to Monta Vista

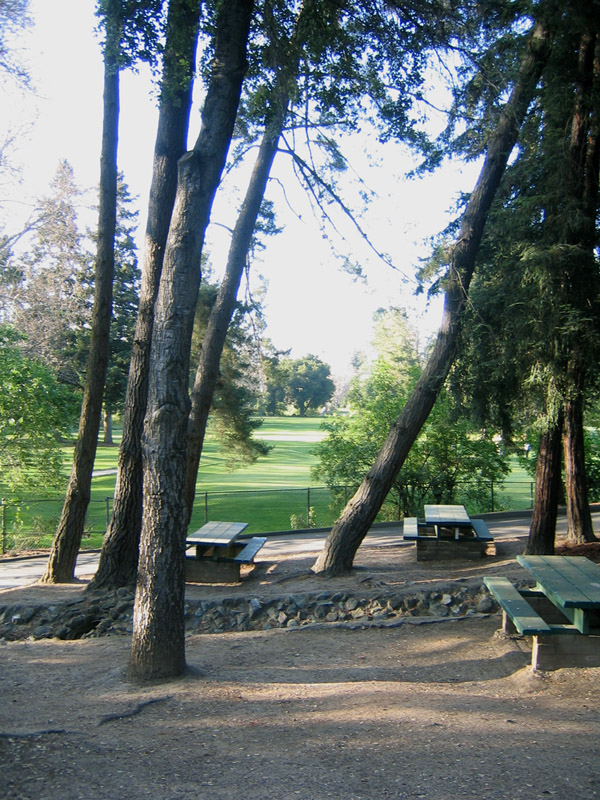
The picnic area of Linda Vista Park in front of Deep Cliff Golf Course

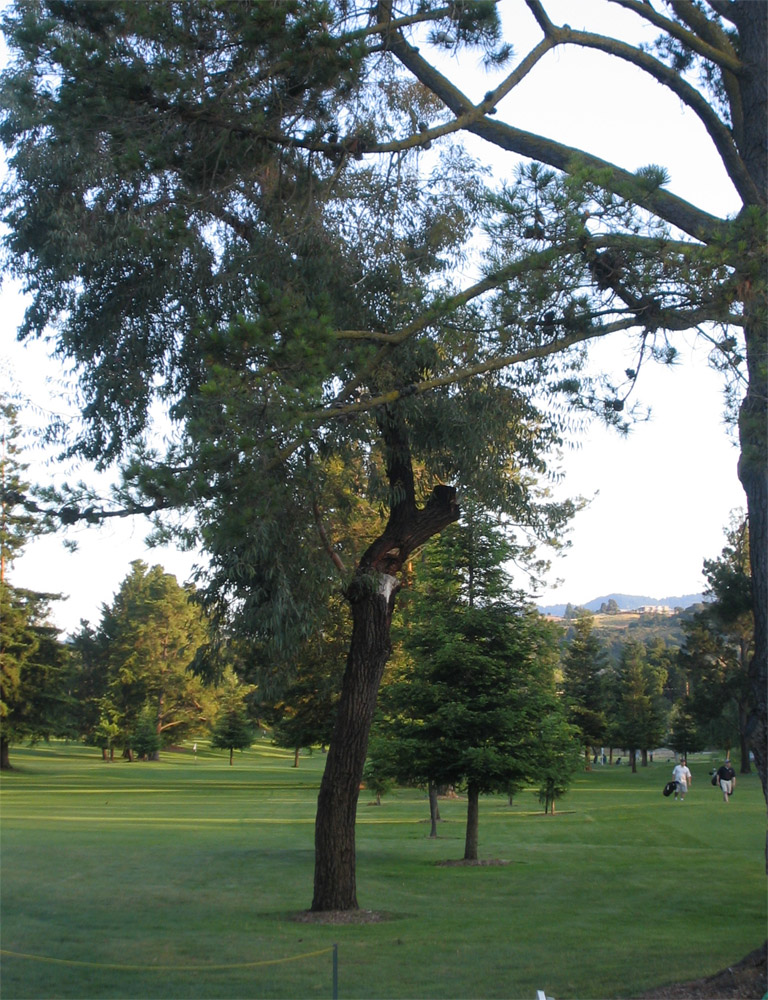
Blackberry Farm Golf Course

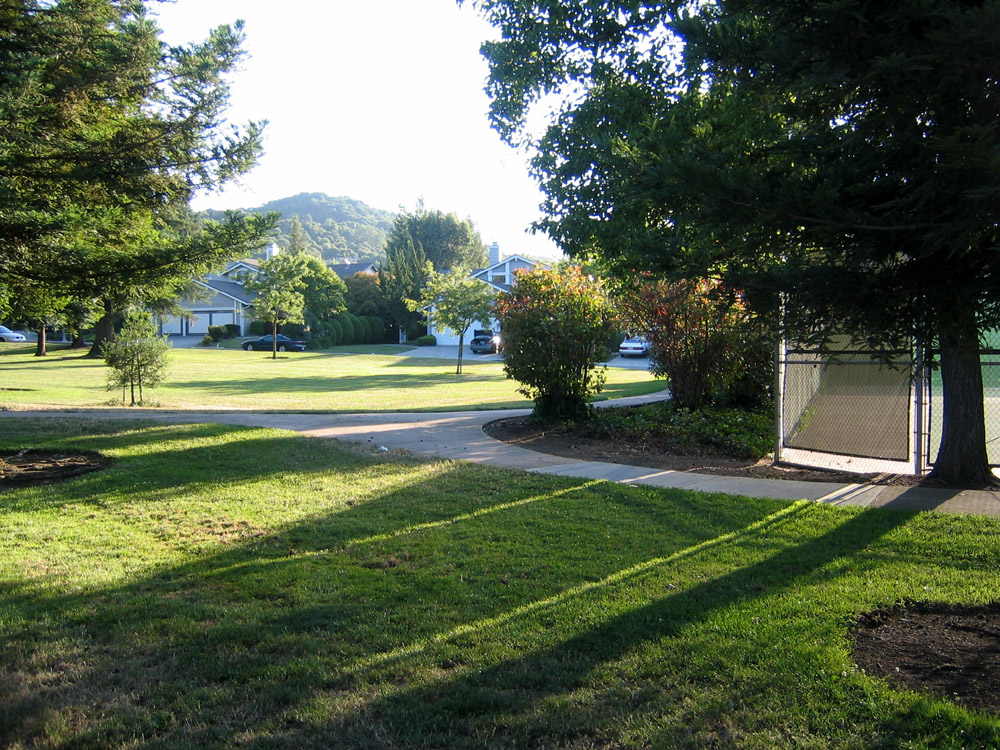
Monta Vista Park

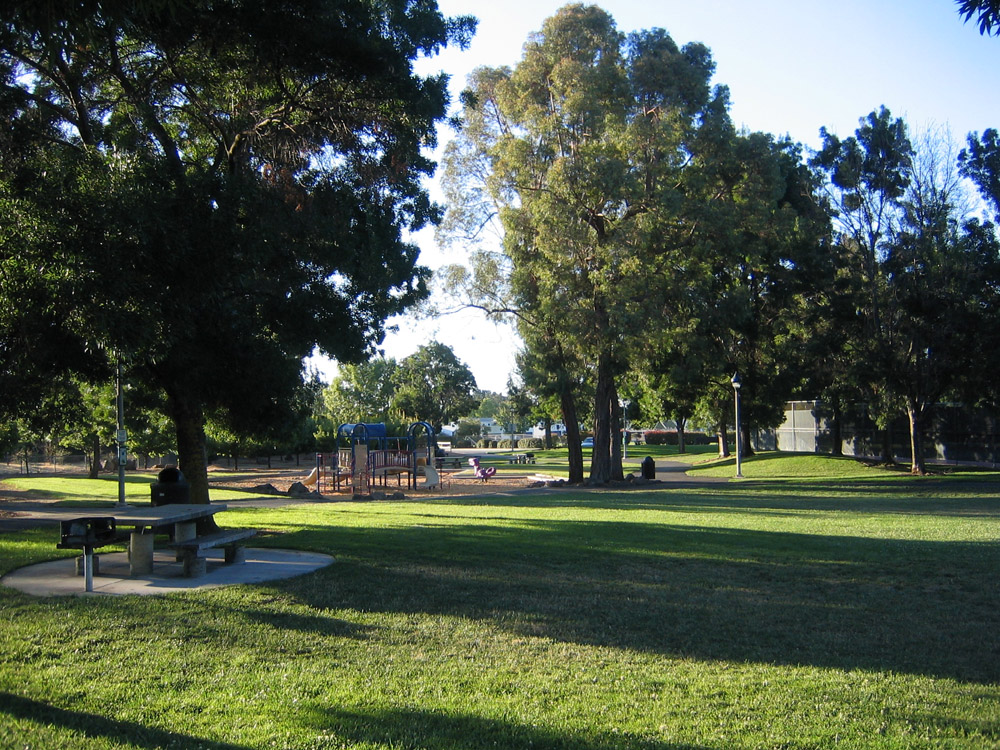
Varian Park

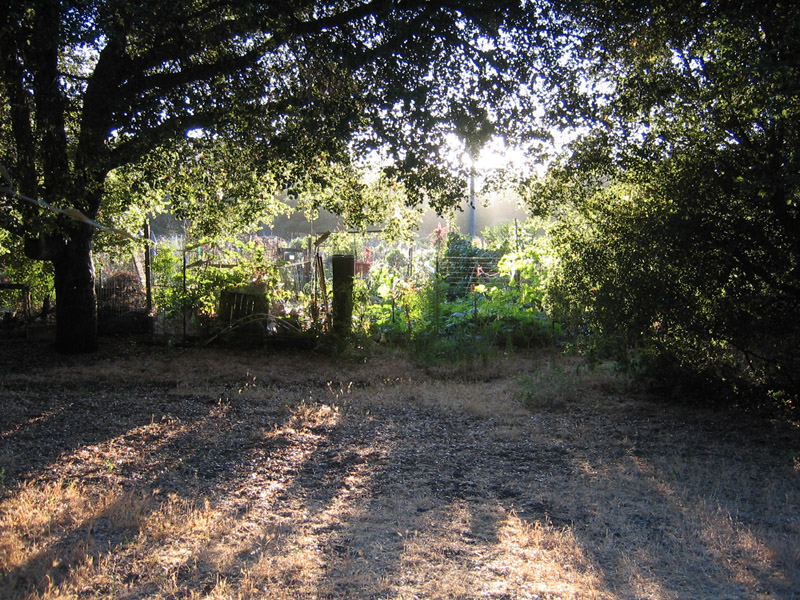
Monta Vista Community Farm at McClellan Ranch
