= Rancho Rinconada, Cupertino, California =

Rancho Rinconada
- Neighborhood
- Location within the Santa Clara Valley
- Coordinates: 37.3164°N 122°W
- Country: United States
- State: California
- County: Santa Clara
- City: Cupertino

Rancho Rinconada (Spanish for "Corner Ranch") is a residential neighborhood in the eastern part of Cupertino, California. It is bordered by Saratoga Creek (just west of Lawrence Expressway), Stevens Creek Boulevard, Miller Avenue and Bollinger Road. It is bordered by the West San Jose neighborhood to the east and south, central Cupertino to the west, and the city of Santa Clara to the north.

Cupertino High School, Sedgwick Elementary School, and Hyde Middle School serve Rancho Rinconada.

Original flyer for the neighborhood showing typical floorplans

== History ==
The homes in Rancho Rinconada were originally low-cost, single-story houses built in the 1950s by builders Stern & Price. These ranch houses or "ranchos" were designed by architect Cliff May and marketed under the name "Miracle House", while their landscapes were designed by landscape architect Douglas Baylis. Similar projects were later undertaken in Palo Alto and Long Beach.

The modular construction and materials used were designed to keep the cost of construction to a bare minimum in order to produce a very affordable home. This modular design reduced materials and man hours to the point where a home could be put up in a single day.

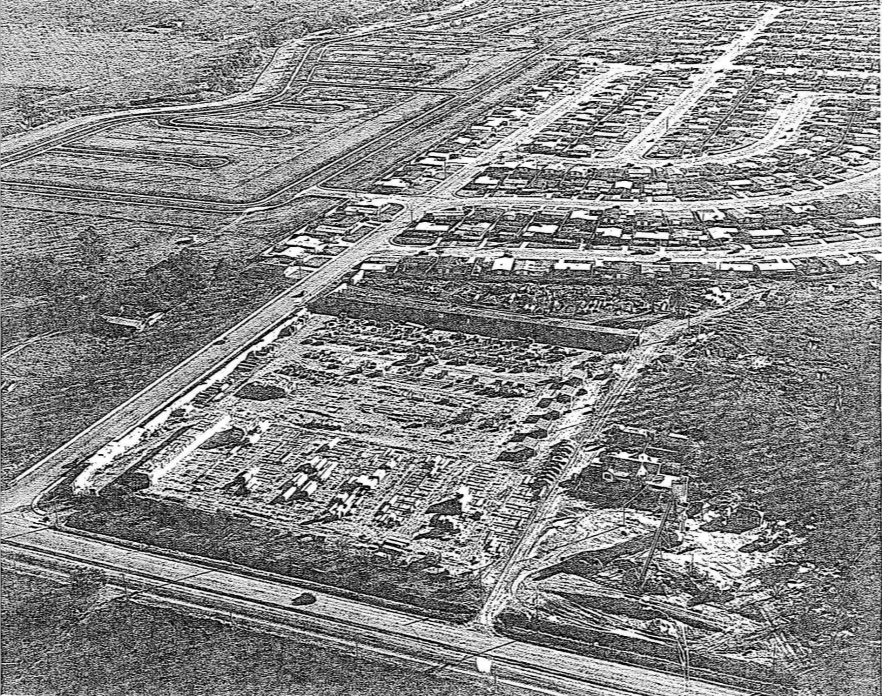
An aerial view of the Ranch Rinconada site under development

Since the Rancho Rinconada residences were outside of any city limits up until the 1990s and were only subject to county regulations, modifications to the houses were not as tightly regulated as those within a city limit. Over the years, many homes in Rancho were remodeled or changed, and much was done without regard to building codes or good building practices.

With the advent of the era for two-income families came the need for two-car garages, which became more prevalent in the 1960s. Rancho Rinconada homes were built with one-car carports. More time-saving kitchen appliances were going into kitchens. The 1970s brought the microwave oven in as a common kitchen appliance, but the Rancho kitchen was designed with only a few low-amp outlets connected to the other houses' outlets and a total of four circuit breakers for the whole house, two 15 amp and two 20 amp. Computers and their peripherals came along in the late 80s, putting even more demand on a home's electrical system, for which Rancho homes were not designed.

As various city boundaries surrounded the county (Santa Clara County) pocket containing Rancho Rinconada, land values rose and its location relative to the high-tech industry made it into a desirable location. Rancho Rinconada was no longer a blue-collar rural community located among cherry orchards. It became a community located in the heart of the high-tech industry explosion and surrounded by tech growth and highly educated white collar workers. However, for part of the 1970s and 1980s, it was a neighborhood in decline that facilitated a lot of undesirable activities.

However, residents of Rancho Rinconada had the privilege of a Cupertino mailing address, which by itself lends to higher land values than surrounding cities, and shared the acclaim of the famed Cupertino schools. As the tech industry drew more Asian engineers and managers whose culture emphasizes education, Cupertino became a highly desirable area for them. Though not a part of the City of Cupertino, Rancho gave a low-cost avenue for families to get their children into one of the best school systems. People had the strong desire to put their children in good schools, and these there often extended families living in the same household. Larger houses were needed for such families and Rancho was the place to get larger housing at the cheapest price for the Cupertino schools.

By the mid-1990s, the value for the Rancho properties that had the original homes was now almost all in the land alone, as the old Rancho homes held little value due to the nature of their cheap construction. The expense of bringing the old modular construction to modern standards had become cost-prohibitive. Rather than do a major remodel, it was cheaper to tear an old Rancho home down and rebuild from scratch. This gave the builder more flexibility in what to build and resulted in a better-built house to meet modern standards.

By the mid-1990s many contractors, particularly some Asian ones, were knocking down the old Rancho buildings and building from scratch. To get as much profit as possible from the property, they built as big as they could. This resulted in many newly built "Pink Mansions" of the two-story 3,000 - 3,500 sq. ft. type on standard lots of 5,500 sq. ft.

Near the end of the 1990s, a portion of the neighborhood bordering San Jose along Lawrence Expressway was annexed by the city, and contractors then began construction on large, executive-style homes. Rancho Rinconada became a target for wealthy Silicon Valley executives, as the county's development laws, to which the rest of the neighborhood was subject, allowed remodeling or rebuilding a home up to the size of the largest home in the immediate area. Additionally, the county did not have community input or review of building plans. As a result, families employed in high-tech industries bought property in unincorporated Rancho Rinconada and demolished the existing houses to build new "monster houses".

In March 1999, the residents of the unincorporated part of Rancho Rinconada voted to be annexed to Cupertino, with the promise of more restrictive property development procedures and improved services to the neighborhood. Later that month, the Cupertino City Council voted into law a bill that required neighborhood comment and reduced the percentage of a lot that could be covered by a building.

The "irrational exuberance" at the dawn of the new millennium brought another paradigm shift in the remodeling and construction of homes in the Rancho Rinconada neighborhood. Not only were large homes being built, but high-end materials, fixtures and appliances were incorporated to market as executive homes for high-income families. Though there were restrictions put in place that reduced the percentage of the lot that could be built above ground, the contractors went underground building underground living space to maintain a large available living space for an executive class home.

As of 2020, the neighborhood was made up of an eclectic group of homes, from the old cheaply built Rancho houses of the 1950s, to the high-end executive homes of the 2000s and 2010s.

37.3164°N 122°W
