= Kennedy Middle School (Cupertino, California) =

John F. Kennedy Middle School

Location
- 821 Bubb Road; Cupertino, Santa Clara, California 95014; United States; 37°18′39″N 122°03′06″W

Information
- Former name: John F. Kennedy Junior High School
- School type: Public middle school
- Established: 1963
- School district: Cupertino Union School District
- NCES District ID: 0610290
- NCES School ID: 061029001138
- Principal: Dr. Gwendolyn DeWees
- Faculty: 41.05 (FTE)
- Grades: 6-8
- Enrollment: 880 (2024–25)
- Language: English
- Athletics conference: Valley Junior High School Athletic League
- Mascot: Cougar (Chico)
- Feeder to: Monta Vista High School
- Website: https://kennedy.cusdk8.org/

John F. Kennedy Middle School is a public middle school in Cupertino, California, United States, feeding nearby Monta Vista High School. It is part of the Cupertino Union School District, which serves approximately 13,500 students, covering 20 nationalities and 45 languages. It was ranked by US News as the 8th best California Middle School and best middle school in the Cupertino Union School District. Kennedy Middle School was a National Blue Ribbon School awardee in 1993 and a California Distinguished School in 2013 and 2024. Its Science Olympiad team won the Division B national championship in 2023 and 2024. As of the 2024–25 school year, Kennedy had 880 students.

== History ==
John F. Kennedy Middle School (KMS) was founded in 1963 as Kennedy Junior High School. The CUSD school board had passed a resolution to name the new school after the victor of the 1960 presidential election before the close election between Kennedy and Nixon had taken place. Originally only composed of seventh and eighth grade, Kennedy extended enrollment to sixth grade in the Fall of 1998, and was renamed to Kennedy Middle school a year later, in Fall 1999.
