= McClellan Ranch Preserve =

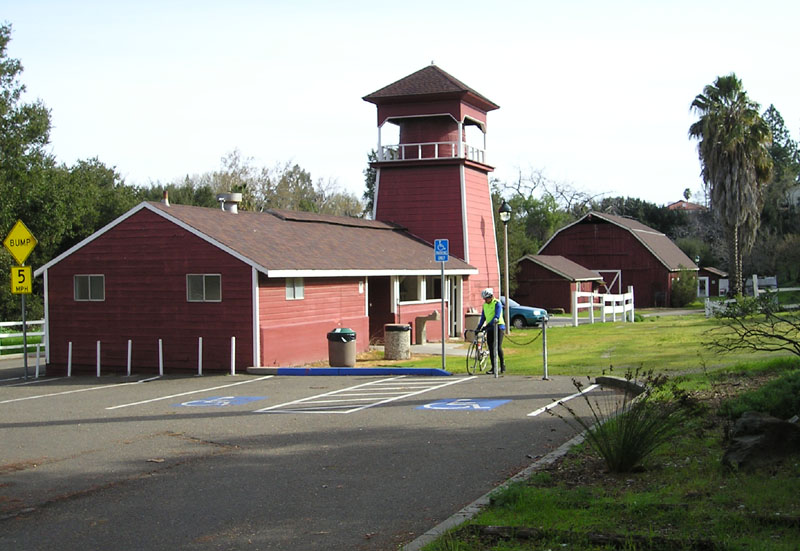
- Barns in McClellan Ranch Preserve
- Interactive map of McClellan Ranch Preserve
- Nearest city: Cupertino, California
- Coordinates: 37.31440°N 122.06289°W
- Area: 18 acres (7.3 ha)

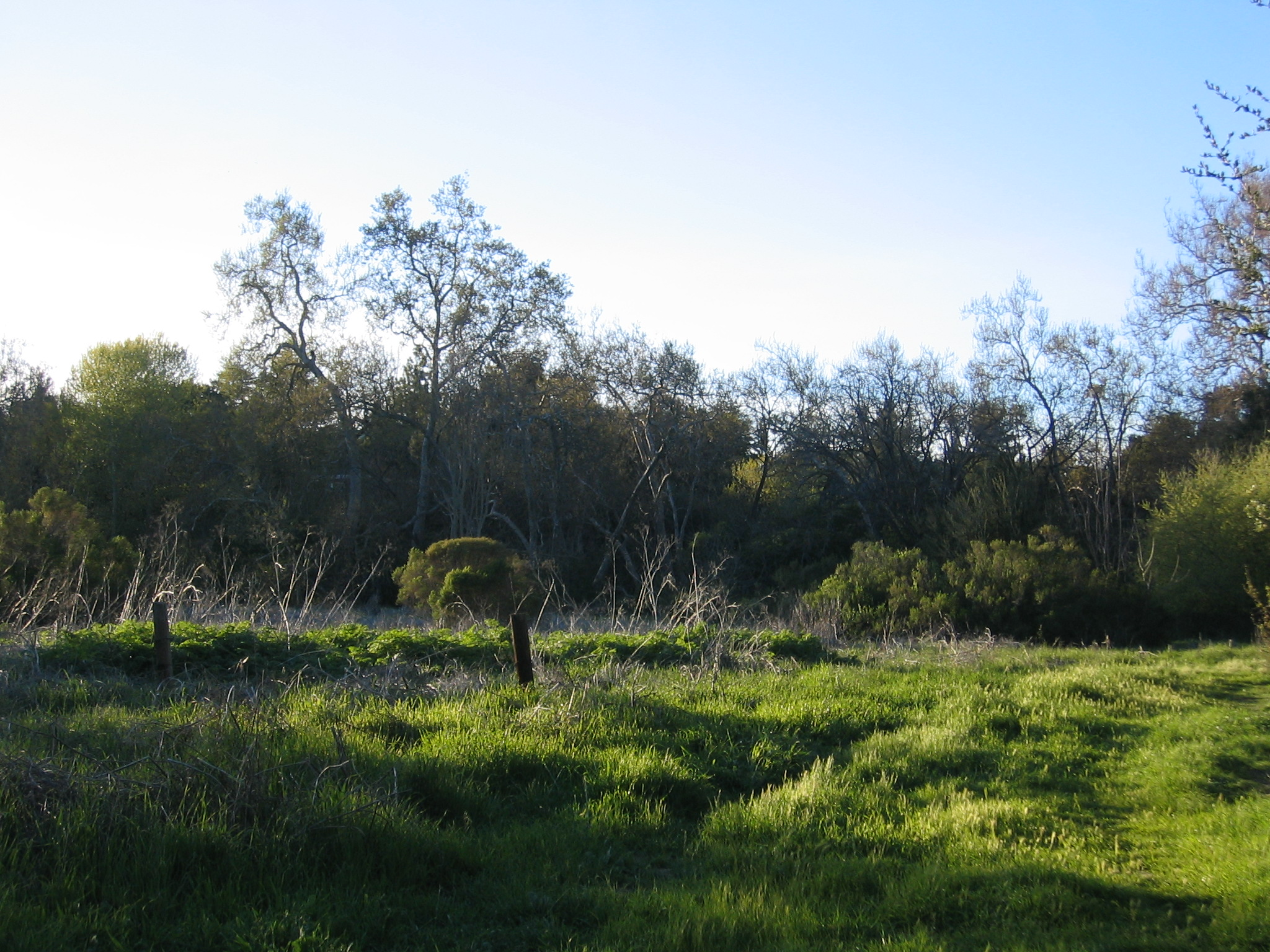
The natural reserve of McClellan Ranch Preserve

McClellan Ranch Preserve is a public preserve located in the Monta Vista neighborhood of Cupertino that still retains its rural ranch look. It used to be a horse ranch owed by the McClellan family in the 1930s, and still preserves the original ranch house, a working milk barn and livestock barn, and a replica blacksmiths shop, along with a natural reserve in the middle of the park. A famous birding hot spot, the ranch park also houses the headquarters of the Santa Clara Valley Audubon Society, a nature library, and the Environmental Education Center.

The Preserve received its current name in 2012, when the City of Cupertino renamed what was then McClellan Ranch Park, in order to respect the land's original designation as a preserve.

The McClellan Ranch maintains a sedate and scenic trail along the meandering Stevens Creek, which flows from the park to Blackberry Farm. The Master Gardeners program of the Santa Clara County also conducts garden talks at the community garden situated at the Preserve.
