= Don Burnett Bicycle-Pedestrian Bridge =

Bridge in Cupertino, California, US

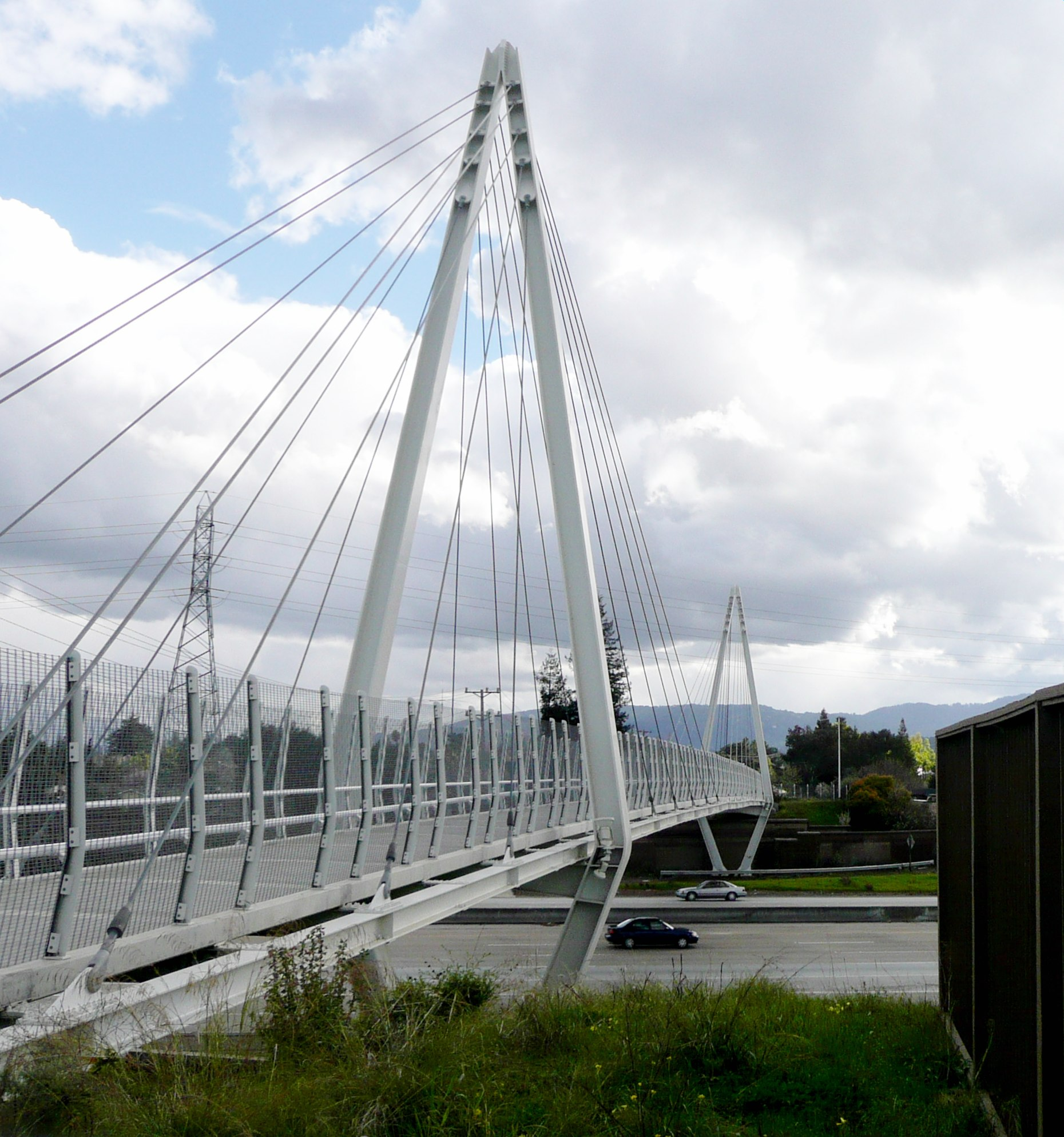
- Coordinates: 37°20′0.2″N 122°3′2″W
- Carries: Bicycles and pedestrians
- Crosses: I-280
- Locale: Cupertino, California
- Official name: Don Burnett Pedestrian and Bicycle Bridge

Characteristics
- Design: Cable-stayed bridge
- Material: Steel
- Total length: 503 ft (153.3 m)
- Height: 79.9 ft (24.4 m)
- Longest span: 325 ft (99.1 m)
- No. of spans: 3

History
- Designer: HNTB Corp, architect Terry Greene
- Construction start: February 1, 2008
- Construction end: November 17, 2008
- Opened: April 30, 2009; 17 years ago

Location
- Interactive map of Don Burnett Bicycle-Pedestrian Bridge

The Don Burnett Bicycle-Pedestrian Bridge is a cable-stayed pedestrian bridge over Interstate 280, spanning Cupertino and Sunnyvale, California. It is the only cable-stayed pedestrian bridge over a highway in California. The bridge opened on April 20, 2009 as Mary Avenue Bridge and received its current name on July 19, 2011. The project was awarded a Helen Putnam Award of Excellence and won the California Transportation Foundation's Pedestrian/Bicycle Project of the Year.

== Construction ==
The bridge was completed in 2008 and it cost $14.8 million. Roughly 80 percent of the funding for the bridge came from grants, bonds and the Santa Clara Valley Transportation Authority. The original plan for the bridge was to use concrete to keep costs down, but a steel design was chosen after the bids for a concrete bridge came in too high.

== Location details ==
North of I-280, Mary Avenue ends in a parking lot and drop-off area for Homestead High School. Mary Avenue continues south of the highway and ends at De Anza College's north entrance.

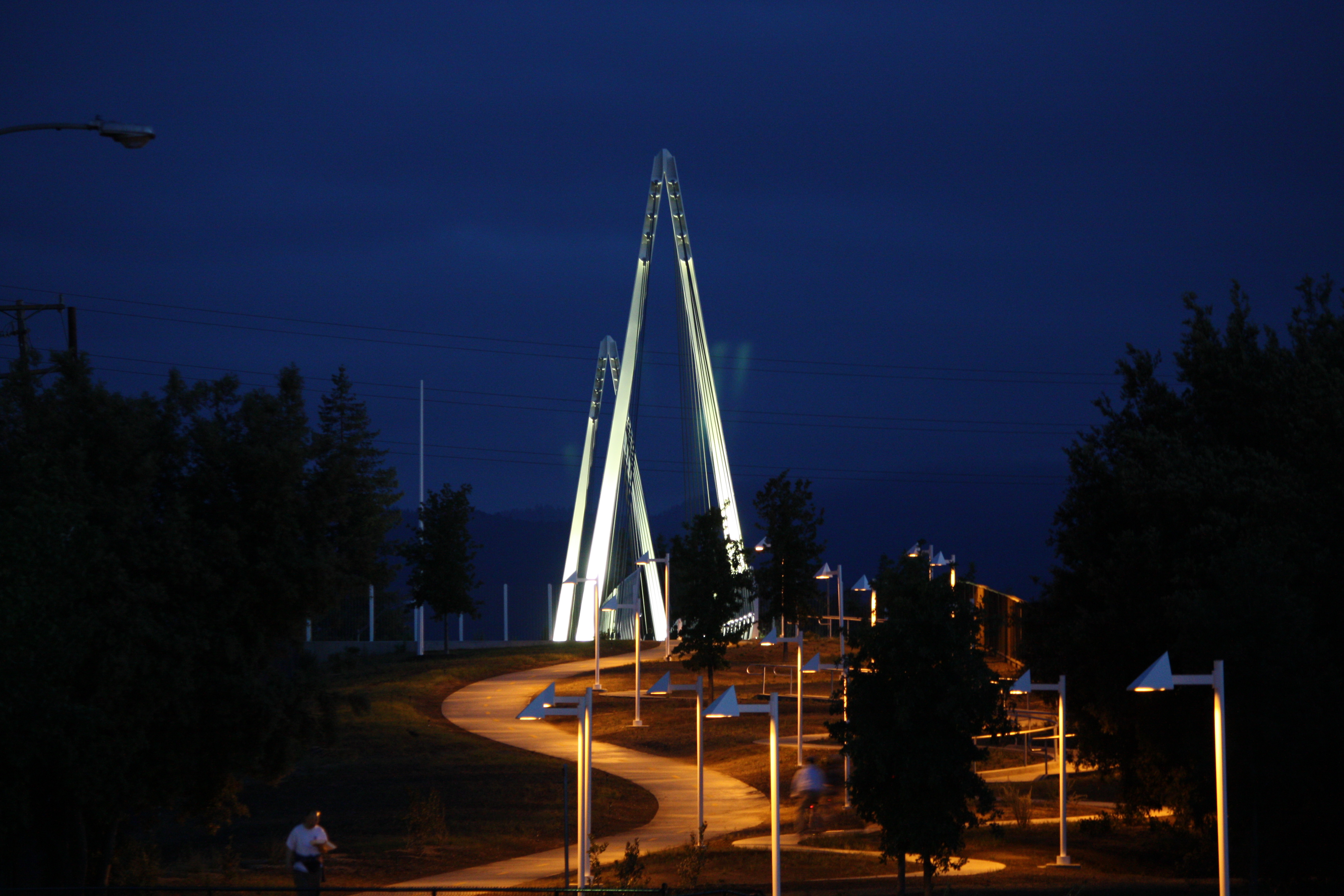
The Don-Burnett Bicycle Pedestrian Bridge at night.

== See also ==
- Bicycle bridge
