= Savita Vaidhyanathan =

American politician

Mayor of Cupertino, California
- In office 2017–2018
- Preceded by: Barry Chang
- Succeeded by: Darcy Paul

Personal details
- Born: 1964 (age 61–62)
- Party: Democratic
- Education: St Stephen's College, Delhi; Delhi University; San Jose State University
- Profession: Program Coordinator; Consultant; Politician

Savita Vaidhyanathan is an American politician who served as the mayor of Cupertino, California. Vaidhyanathan is the first Mayor of Indian descent for the city of Cupertino. Vaidhyanathan was elected to the Cupertino City Council in 2014. She served as mayor from 2017 to 2018.

== Personal life ==
Vaidhyanathan was born in India. She holds a B.A in Math (Honors) from St. Stephens College, a B.Ed from Lucknow University, & an MBA from San Jose State University. She is married to R. 'Doc' Vaidhyanathan and has one daughter, Anagha Vaidhyanathan. She is of Tamil descent, and is a naturalized American citizen.

== Political career ==
On March 1, 2017, Vaidhyanathan delivered the state of the city address in which she provided updates on Apple Park, the recent opening of Main Street, and the approval of the Hamptons Apartments and Marina Plaza mixed-use project. Vaidhyanathan served as mayor during the opening of the new Apple Park.

Vaidhyanathan called on law enforcement and the sheriff's department to hold a town hall meeting focused on immigrant rights. Vaidhyanathan spoke at an anti-hate rally in Palo Alto. She and the Cupertino City Council passed a resolution "to protecting the constitutional rights of its residents."
