= Cliff Yiskis =

NASCAR driver

NASCAR Cup Series career
- 1 race run over 1 year
- Best finish: 89th (1957)
- First race: 1957 Race #19 (Eureka)
Wins	Top tens	Poles
0	0	0

Cliff Yiskis (April 18, 1929 — November 20, 2011) was a NASCAR driver from Cupertino, California. He competed in one Cup series event in his career. That came in 1957, when Yiskis had a solid qualifying effort of tenth at Eureka Speedway. From there, Yiskis was able to move through the field to a fourth-place finish. Yiskis raced for years in Super Modifieds at San Jose Speedway in San Jose, California and Kearney Bowl Speedway in Fresno, California; finishing tenth in NASCAR State of California points in 1968.

Yiskis was inducted into the San Jose Speedway Hall of Fame in 1999.

== Motorsports career results ==
=== NASCAR ===
(key) (Bold – Pole position awarded by qualifying time. Italics – Pole position earned by points standings or practice time. * – Most laps led.)

==== Grand National Series ====
NASCAR Grand National Series results
Year	Team	No.	Make	1	2	3	4	5	6	7	8	9	10	11	12	13	14	15	16	17	18	19	20	21	22	23	24	25	26	27	28	29	30	31	32	33	34	35	36	37	38	39	40	41	42	43	44	45	46	47	48	49	50	51	52	53	NGNC	Pts	Ref
1957	Reggie Ausmus	25	Ford	WSS	CON	TIC	DAB	CON	WIL	HBO	AWS	NWS	LAN	CLT	PIF	GBF	POR	CCF	RCH	MAR	POR	EUR; 4	LIN	LCS	ASP	NWP	CLB	CPS	PIF	JAC	RSP	CLT	MAS	POR	HCY	NOR	LCS	GLN	KPC	LIN	OBS	MYB	DAR	NYF	AWS	CSF	SCF	LAN	CLB	CCF	CLT	MAR	NBR	CON	NWS	GBF	89th	176	

==== Pacific Coast Late Model Division ====
NASCAR Pacific Coast Late Model results
Year	Team Owner	No.	Make	1	2	3	4	5	6	7	8	9	10	11	12	13	14	15	16	17	18	19	20	21	22	23	24	NPCLMC	Pts	Ref
1957	Reggie Ausmus	25	Ford	GST	GST	GST	BKS	POR	GST	POR	GST	EUR; 4	SGS	SRS	ASP	CCO	CPS	MER	GST	BST	POR	BES	KPC	GST	GST	CSF	SCF	N/A	N/A	
