= Cupertino, California =

City in California, United States

- City
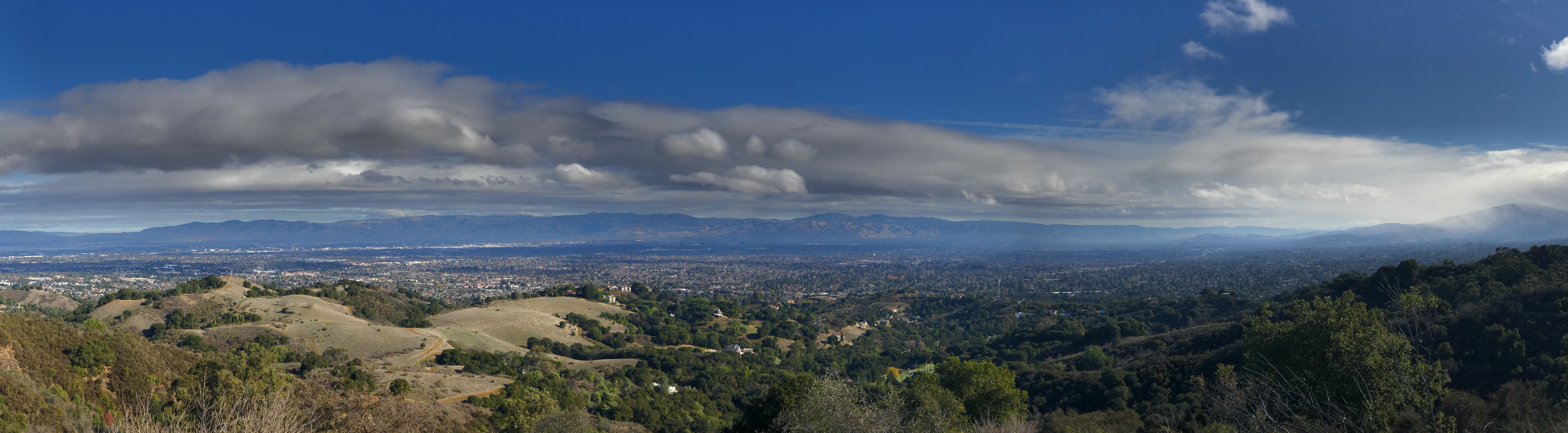
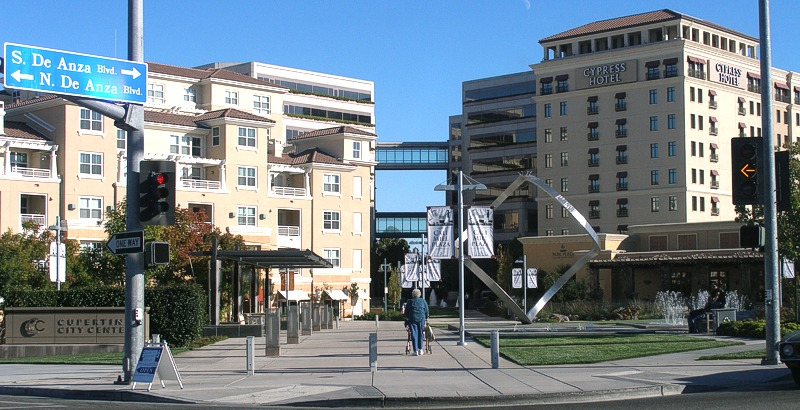
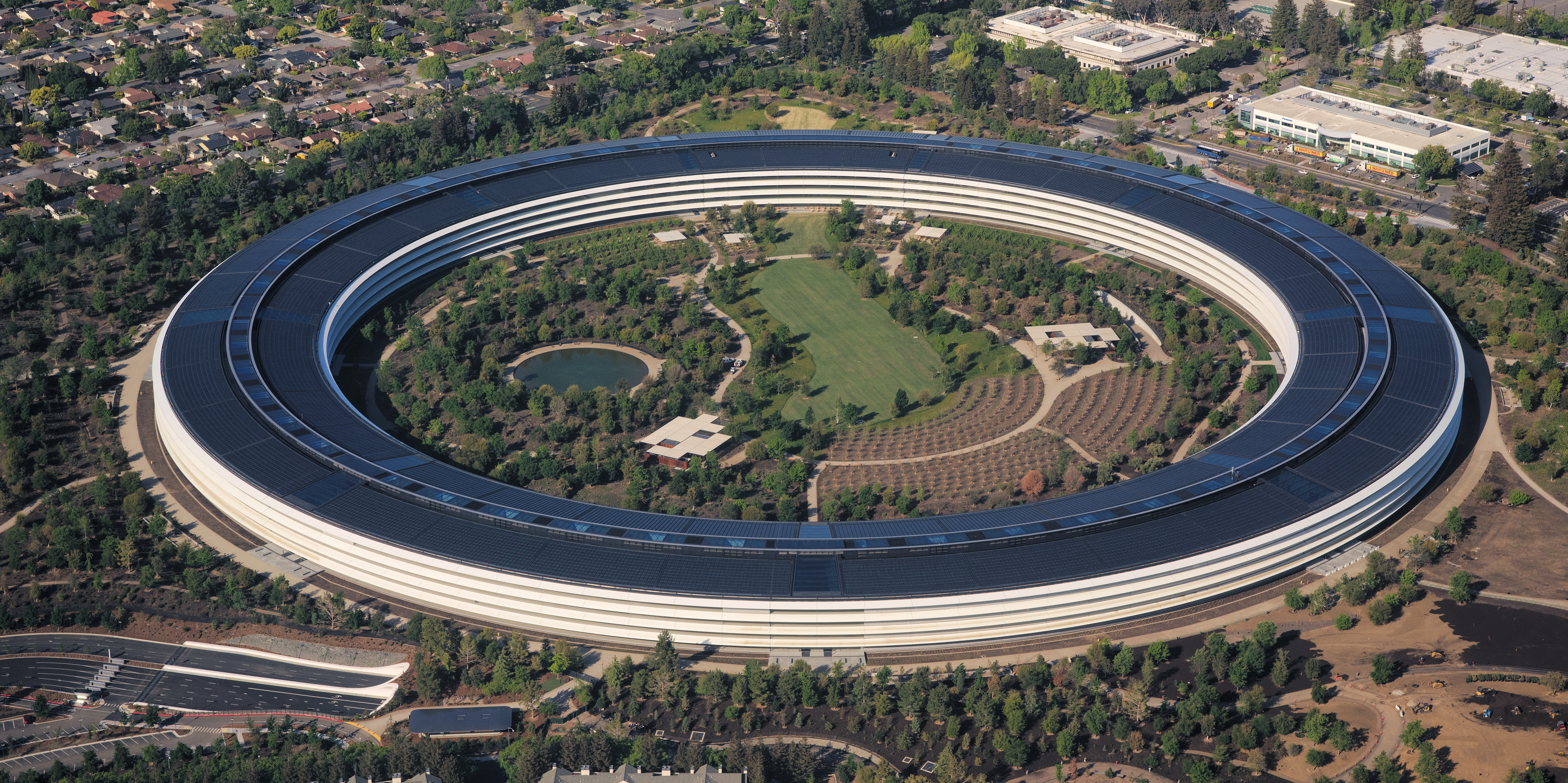
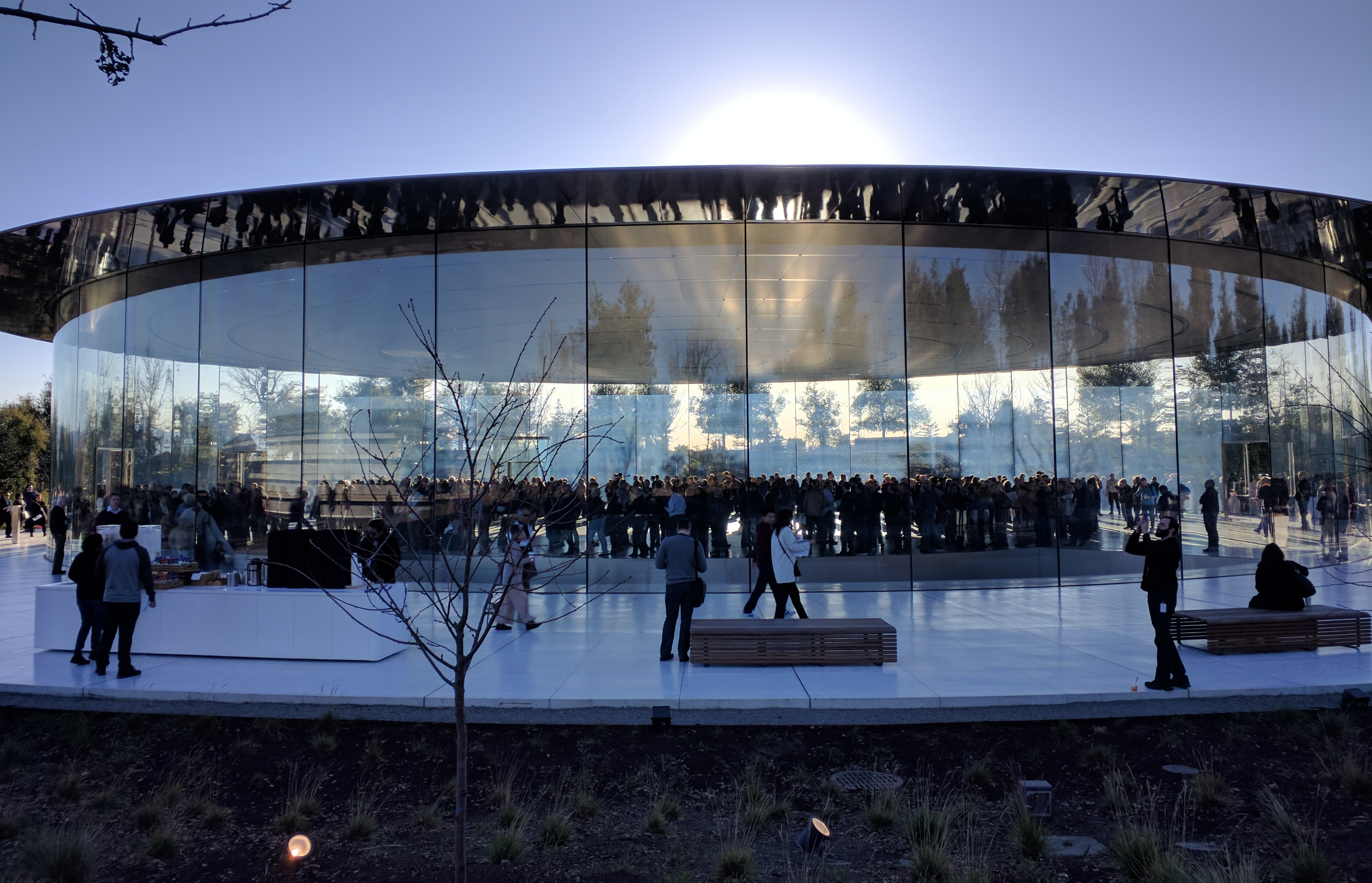
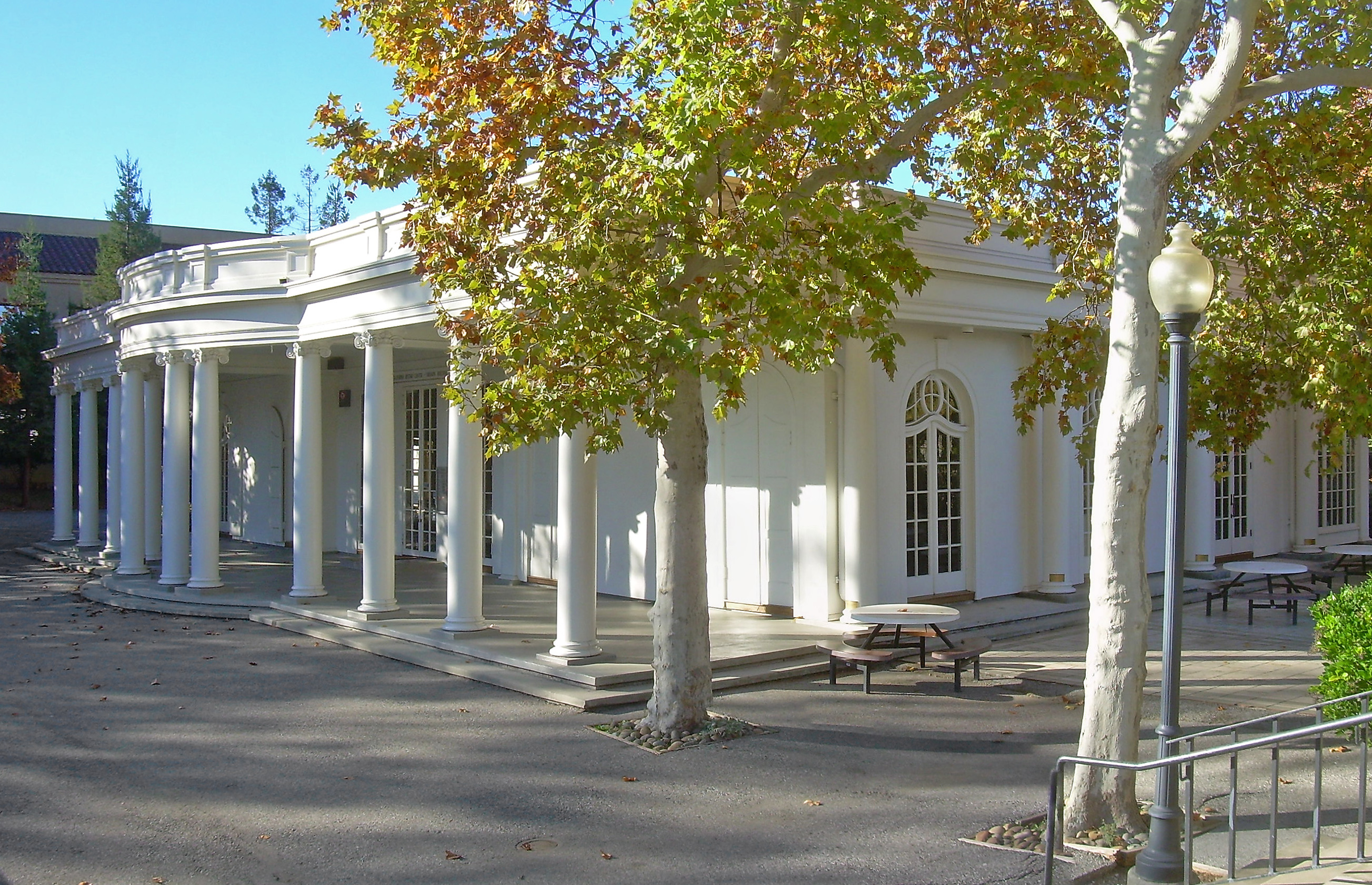
- Clockwise from top: View from the Santa Cruz Mountains; Apple Park (Apple HQ); Le Petit Trianon; Steve Jobs Theater; Cupertino City Center

- Flag Seal
- Interactive map of Cupertino, California
- Location within the United States
- Coordinates: 37°19′23″N 122°01′55″W
- Country: United States
- State: California
- County: Santa Clara
- Region: San Francisco Bay Area
- Incorporated: October 10, 1955
- Named for: Arroyo San José de Cupertino (named after Saint Joseph of Cupertino)

Government
  - Type: Council–manager
  - Body: City council: • J.R. Fruen; • Sheila Mohan; • Ray Wang
  - Mayor: Kitty Moore
  - Vice Mayor: Liang Chao

Area
  - Total: 11.33 sq mi (29.34 km^{2})
  - Land: 11.33 sq mi (29.34 km^{2})
  - Water: 0 sq mi (0.00 km^{2}) 0.01%
- Elevation: 236 ft (72 m)

Population (2020)
  - Total: 60,381
  - Estimate (2025): 58,333 ▼
  - Density: 5,330/sq mi (2,058/km^{2})
- Time zone: UTC−8 (Pacific)
  - Summer (DST): UTC−7 (PDT)
- ZIP Codes: 95014, 95015
- Area codes: 408/669
- FIPS code: 06-17610
- GNIS feature IDs: 277496, 2410278
- Website: cupertino.gov

Cupertino (/ˌkuːpərˈtiːnoʊ/ KOOP-ər-TEEN-oh) is a city in Santa Clara County, California, United States, directly west of San Jose on the western edge of the Santa Clara Valley with portions extending into the foothills of the Santa Cruz Mountains. The population was 60,381 as of the 2020 census, decreasing by 1,671 (-2.9%) to a Census-estimated 58,710 by 2024. The city is the home of Apple, headquartered at Apple Park.

Named for a local creek, which Spanish explorer Juan Bautista de Anza's cartographer had named after Saint Joseph of Cupertino, Cupertino was officially incorporated in 1955, though it saw economic activity in the early 19th century. The area was originally an agricultural community producing prunes, apricots and cherries, with a winery joining the ranks by the 19th century. Cupertino grew immensely during the 1950s due to the suburban housing boom experienced after the Second World War, concurring with the earliest roots of Silicon Valley developing near Cupertino. By the 1960s, office parks were being built and technology companies were setting up shop in the city, most notably Apple and Hewlett-Packard.

Cupertino remains a cornerstone of Silicon Valley. The economy is dominated by technology companies, including large ones like Apple, as well as medium-sized companies and startups.

== Etymology ==
Cupertino was named after Arroyo San José de Cupertino (now Stevens Creek). The creek had been named by Spanish explorer Juan Bautista de Anza's cartographer, who named it after Italian saint Joseph of Cupertino (Giuseppe da Copertino). The name Cupertino first became widely used when John T. Doyle, a San Francisco lawyer, and historian, named his winery on McClellan Road Cupertino. After the turn of the 20th century, Cupertino displaced the former name for the region, which was West Side.

== History ==
Cupertino Improvement Association circa 1950s

In the 19th century, Cupertino was a small rural village at the crossroads of Stevens Creek Road and Saratoga-Mountain View Road (also known locally as Highway 9; later Saratoga–Sunnyvale Road, and then renamed to De Anza Boulevard within Cupertino city limits). For decades, the intersection was dominated on the southeast corner by the R. Cali Brothers Feed Mill, which is replaced today with the Cali Mill Plaza and City Hall. Back then, it was known as the West Side and was part of Fremont Township. The primary economic activity was fruit agriculture. Almost all of the land within Cupertino's present-day boundaries was covered by prune, plum, apricot, and cherry orchards. A winery on Montebello Ridge overlooking the Cupertino valley region was also in operation by the late 19th century.

Soon railroads, electric railways, and dirt roads traversed the West Side farmlands. Monta Vista, Cupertino's first housing tract, was developed in the mid-20th century as a result of the electric railway's construction.

After World War II, a population and suburban housing boom dramatically shifted the demographics and economy of the Santa Clara Valley, as the "Valley of Heart's Delight" (sometimes "Garden of Earthly Delights") was beginning to transform into "Silicon Valley". In 1954, a rancher, Norman Nathanson, the Cupertino-Monta Vista Improvement Association, and the Fact Finding Committee, began a drive for incorporation. On September 27, 1955, voters approved the incorporation of the city of Cupertino (225 voted "yes" and 183 voted "no"). Cupertino officially became Santa Clara County's 13th city on October 10, 1955.

A major milestone in Cupertino's development was the creation by some of the city's largest landowners of VALLCO Business and Industrial Park in the early 1960s. Of the 25 property owners, 17 decided to pool their land to form VALLCO Park, 6 sold to Varian Associates (property later sold to Hewlett-Packard), and two opted for transplanting to farms elsewhere. The name VALLCO was derived from the names of the principal developers: Varian Associates and the Leonard, Lester, Craft, and Orlando families. A neighborhood outdoor shopping center and, much later, the enclosed Vallco Fashion Park, briefly renamed Cupertino Square, were also developed. The fashion park was eventually bulldozed in the early 21st Century and is expected to become a mixed-use neighborhood.

De Anza College opened in 1967. The college, named for Juan Bautista De Anza, occupies a 112-acre (0.45 km^{2}) site that was the location of a winery built at the turn of the 20th century, called Beaulieu by its owners, Charles and Ella Baldwin. Their mansion has now become the California History Center. De Anza College had 16,335 students as of 2022.

By the 1980s, Apple and Hewlett-Packard were the primary technology companies with major presences in Cupertino.

Housing developments were rapidly constructed in the following years as developers created neighborhoods, including Fairgrove, Garden Gate, Monta Vista, Seven Springs, and other developments. The city is known for its high real estate prices.

2010 saw HP consolidate its Bay Area workforce in its hometown of Palo Alto, and the company proceeded to close its campus within Cupertino. The city estimated that the closure of the campus would lead to 3,000 to 3,500 employees being relocated. Apple eventually bought the campus site from HP for an undisclosed price and prepared to use the land to build Apple Park.

== Geography ==
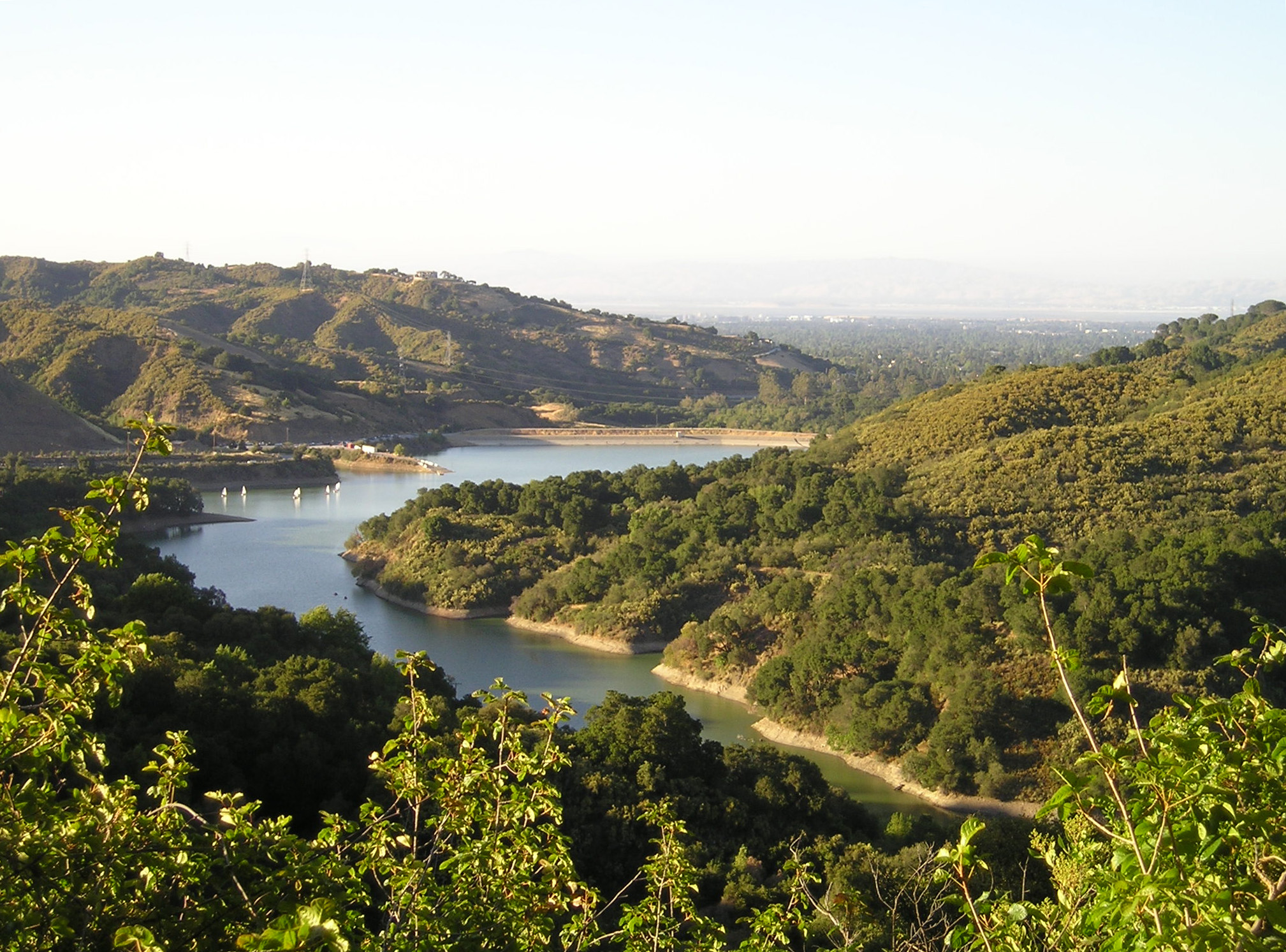
Stevens Creek Reservoir

Cupertino is at the southern end of San Francisco Bay. The eastern part of the city, located in the Santa Clara Valley, is flat, while the western part rises into the Santa Cruz Mountains. Cupertino borders San Jose and Santa Clara to the east, Saratoga to the south, Sunnyvale and Los Altos to the north, and Loyola to the northwest.

Several streams run through Cupertino on their way to south San Francisco Bay, including (from north to south): Permanente Creek, Stevens Creek, San Tomas Aquino Creek and its Smith Creek, the Regnart Creek and Prospect Creek tributaries of Calabazas Creek, and Saratoga Creek.

According to the United States Census Bureau, the city has a total area of 11.3 square miles (29 km^{2}), of which 99.99% is land and 0.01% is water.

=== Climate ===
The average day in Cupertino features a warm-summer Mediterranean climate (Csb under the Köppen climate classification system), with warm to hot, dry summers and cool, wet winters.

Climate data for Cupertino, California
Month	Jan	Feb	Mar	Apr	May	Jun	Jul	Aug	Sep	Oct	Nov	Dec	Year
Record high °F (°C)	79 (26)	89 (32)	89 (32)	94 (34)	104 (40)	108 (42)	111 (44)	103 (39)	109 (43)	100 (38)	96 (36)	87 (31)	111 (44)
Mean daily maximum °F (°C)	58.4 (14.7)	62.2 (16.8)	65.7 (18.7)	70 (21)	74.3 (23.5)	79.1 (26.2)	82 (28)	81.7 (27.6)	81.2 (27.3)	75.5 (24.2)	66.8 (19.3)	59 (15)	71.3 (21.9)
Daily mean °F (°C)	48.3 (9.1)	51.6 (10.9)	54 (12)	57 (14)	60.7 (15.9)	64.7 (18.2)	67.3 (19.6)	67 (19)	65.9 (18.8)	61.2 (16.2)	54.3 (12.4)	48.9 (9.4)	58.4 (14.6)
Mean daily minimum °F (°C)	38.2 (3.4)	41.1 (5.1)	42.4 (5.8)	43.9 (6.6)	47.1 (8.4)	50.2 (10.1)	52.6 (11.4)	52.4 (11.3)	50.6 (10.3)	47 (8)	41.8 (5.4)	38.8 (3.8)	45.5 (7.5)
Record low °F (°C)	19 (−7)	23 (−5)	28 (−2)	29 (−2)	32 (0)	31 (−1)	38 (3)	39 (4)	36 (2)	30 (−1)	24 (−4)	20 (−7)	19 (−7)
Average rainfall inches (cm)	3 (7.6)	2.6 (6.6)	2.3 (5.8)	1 (2.5)	0.4 (1.0)	0.1 (0.25)	0 (0)	0 (0)	0.3 (0.76)	0.6 (1.5)	1.5 (3.8)	2.7 (6.9)	14.5 (36.71)
Average rainy days	10	9	9	5	3	1	0	0	1	3	6	9	56
Source: Monthly- All Data for Cupertino- Santa Clara University, California

=== Neighborhoods ===
Cupertino is made up of numerous subdivisions, most of them developed since the 1960s. Most of Cupertino's contemporary properties were developed around 1960. The area between Stevens Creek Boulevard, Miller Avenue, Bollinger Road, and Lawrence Expressway contains 224 Eichler homes, built during the 1950s. Two of the newest parts of Cupertino are among its oldest housing tracts. Monta Vista and Rancho Rinconada were developed outside of the city's boundaries in the 1950s and before. Rancho Rinconada was annexed in 1999 and the last part of Monta Vista was annexed in 2004. The neighborhood of Seven Springs is at the southwestern tip of Cupertino and was developed in the late 1980s. The newest and most northwestern neighborhood, Oak Valley, borders Rancho San Antonio Park and was developed around the turn of the millennium.

== Demographics ==
Historical population
Census	Pop.	Note	%±
1960	3,664		—
1970	17,895		388.4%
1980	34,297		91.7%
1990	40,263		17.4%
2000	50,546		25.5%
2010	58,302		15.3%
2020	60,381		3.6%
2024 (est.)	58,610	▼	−2.9%
U.S. Decennial Census

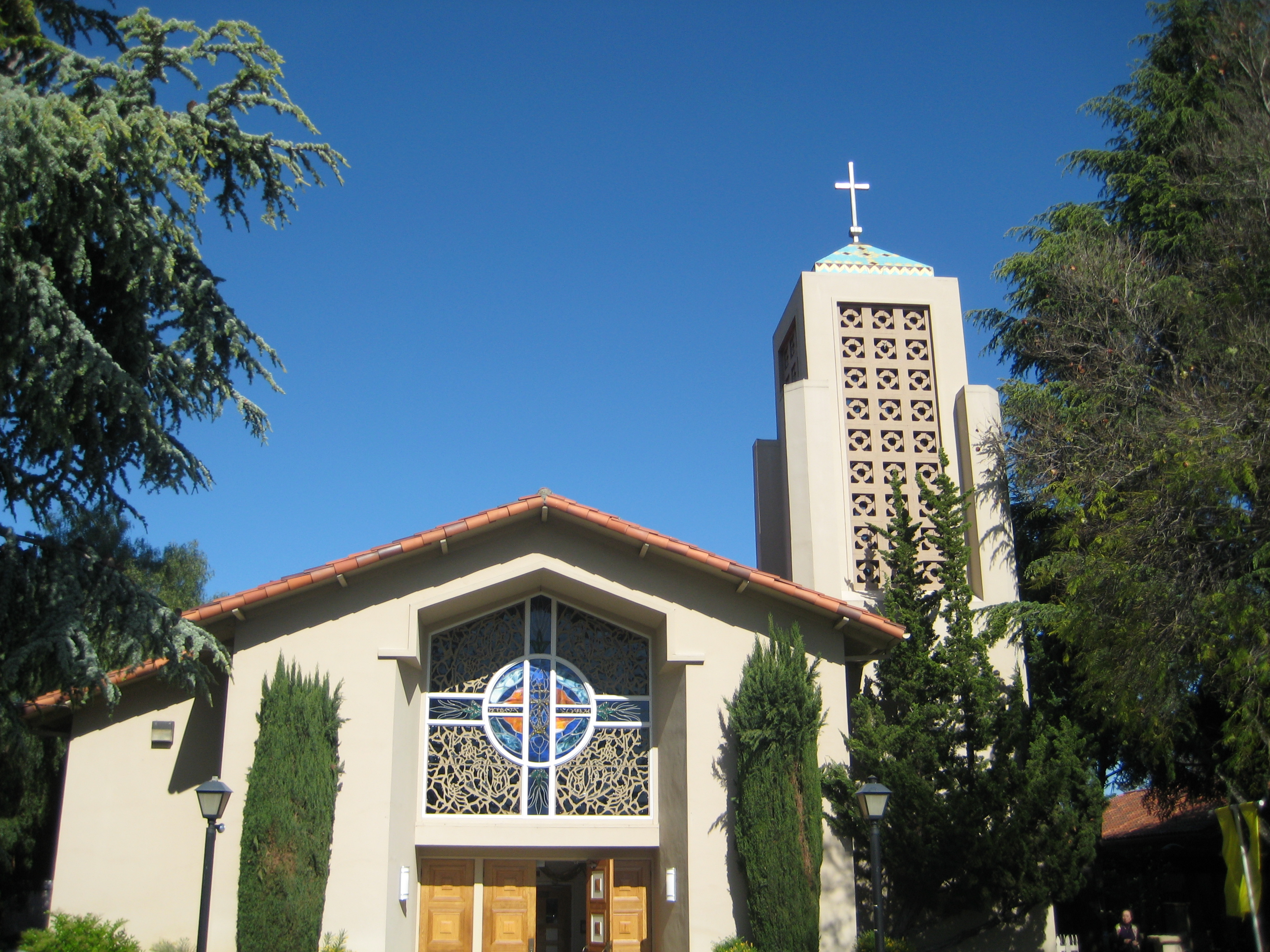
Saint Joseph of Cupertino Church of the Catholic Diocese of San Jose

63 percent of Cupertino's population was of Asian ancestry in 2010, compared to 32 percent in Santa Clara County overall. Money's Best Places to Live, "America's best small towns", ranked Cupertino as #27 in 2012, the second highest in California. In 2014, Movoto Real Estate ranked Cupertino the seventh "happiest" suburb in the United States, ranking highly in the categories of income, safety, marriage, and education.

In 2015, Forbes ranked Cupertino as one of the most educated places in the U.S. in respect to the percentage of high school and college graduates.

=== Racial and ethnic composition ===
Cupertino, California – racial and ethnic composition Note: the US Census treats Hispanic/Latino as an ethnic category. This table excludes Latinos from the racial categories and assigns them to a separate category. Hispanics/Latinos may be of any race.
Race / ethnicity (NH = Non-Hispanic)	Pop. 2000	Pop. 2010	Pop. 2020	% 2000	% 2010	% 2020
White alone (NH)	24,181	17,085	13,085	47.84%	29.30%	21.67%
Black or African American alone (NH)	319	322	360	0.63%	0.55%	0.60%
Native American or Alaska Native alone (NH)	80	80	53	0.16%	0.14%	0.09%
Asian alone (NH)	22,414	36,815	42,349	44.34%	63.15%	70.14%
Native Hawaiian or Pacific Islander alone (NH)	58	39	21	0.11%	0.07%	0.03%
Other race alone (NH)	124	110	230	0.25%	0.19%	0.38%
Mixed race or multiracial (NH)	1,360	1,738	1,953	2.69%	2.98%	3.23%
Hispanic or Latino (any race)	2,010	2,113	2,330	3.98%	3.62%	3.86%
Total	50,546	58,302	60,381	100.00%	100.00%	100.00%

=== 2020 census ===
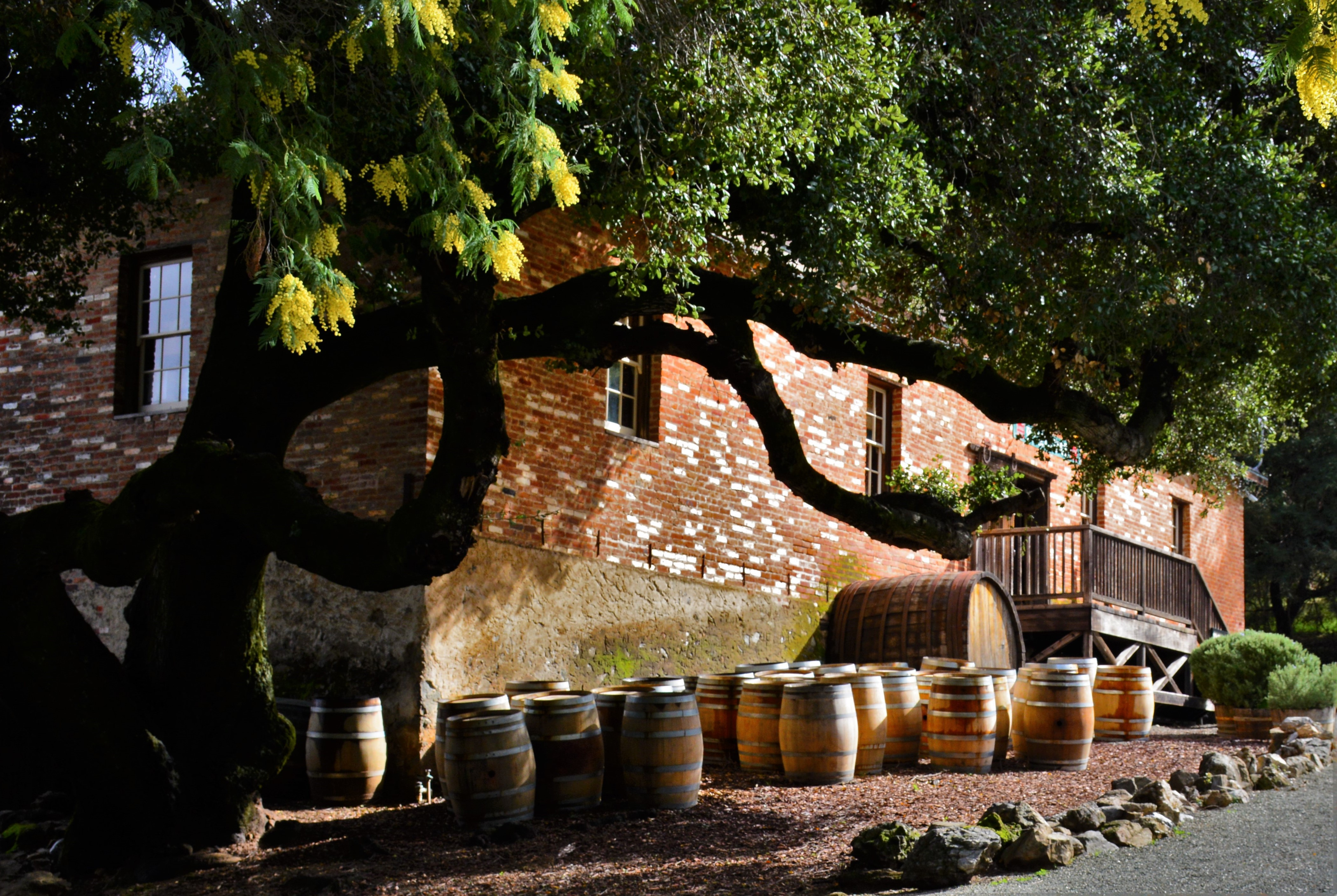
Picchetti Brothers Winery

As of the 2020 census, Cupertino had a population of 60,381 and a population density of 5,330.2 inhabitants per square mile (2,058.0/km^{2}).

The median age was 41.4 years. 23.9% of residents were under the age of 18 and 15.3% of residents were 65 years of age or older. For every 100 females there were 99.1 males, and for every 100 females age 18 and over there were 97.8 males age 18 and over.

The census reported that 99.4% of the population lived in households, 0.2% lived in non-institutionalized group quarters, and 0.4% were institutionalized. 99.9% of residents lived in urban areas, while 0.1% lived in rural areas.

There were 20,615 households in Cupertino, of which 43.9% had children under the age of 18 living in them. Of all households, 69.4% were married-couple households, 2.3% were cohabiting-couple households, 12.0% were households with a male householder and no spouse or partner present, and 16.3% were households with a female householder and no spouse or partner present. About 16.0% of all households were made up of individuals and 8.4% had someone living alone who was 65 years of age or older. The average household size was 2.91, and there were 16,406 families (79.6% of all households).

There were 21,701 housing units at an average density of 1,915.7 units per square mile (739.7 units/km^{2}), of which 5.0% were vacant. Of occupied units, 59.2% were owner-occupied and 40.8% were renter-occupied. The homeowner vacancy rate was 0.5% and the rental vacancy rate was 6.5%.

=== 2023 ACS estimates ===
In 2023, the US Census Bureau estimated that 55.1% of the population were foreign-born. Of all people aged 5 or older, 36.8% spoke only English at home, 1.8% spoke Spanish, 16.7% spoke other Indo-European languages, 43.0% spoke Asian or Pacific Islander languages, and 1.6% spoke other languages. Of those aged 25 or older, 97.2% were high school graduates and 83.1% had a bachelor's degree.

The median household income in 2023 was $231,139, and the per capita income was $106,821. About 3.2% of families and 4.3% of the population were below the poverty line.

=== 2010 census ===
The 2010 United States census reported that Cupertino had a population of 58,302. The population density was 5,179.1 inhabitants per square mile (1,999.7/km^{2}). The racial makeup of Cupertino was 18,270 (31.3%) White, 344 (0.6%) Black American, 117 (0.2%) Native American, 36,895 (63.3%) Asian (28.1% Chinese, 22.6% Indian, 4.6% Korean, 3.3% Japanese, 1.3% Vietnamese), 54 (0.1%) Pacific Islander, 670 (1.1%) from other races, and 1,952 (3.3%) from two or more races. Hispanic of any race were 2,113 persons (3.6%); 2.4% of Cupertino's population is of Mexican ancestry.

The census reported that 57,965 people (99.4% of the population) lived in households, 61 (0.1%) lived in non-institutionalized group quarters, and 276 (0.5%) were institutionalized.

There were 20,181 households, out of which 9,539 (47.3%) had children under the age of 18 living in them, 13,802 (68.4%) were opposite-sex married couples living together, 1,393 (6.9%) had a female householder with no husband present, 581 (2.9%) had a male householder with no wife present. There were 378 (1.9%) unmarried opposite-sex partnerships, and 89 (0.4%) same-sex married couples or partnerships. 3,544 households (17.6%) were made up of individuals, and 1,612 (8.0%) had someone living alone who was 65 years of age or older. The average household size was 2.87. There were 15,776 families (78.2% of all households); the average family size was 3.28.

The population was spread out, with 16,075 people (27.6%) under the age of 18, 3,281 people (5.6%) aged 18 to 24, 15,621 people (26.8%) aged 25 to 44, 16,044 people (27.5%) aged 45 to 64, and 7,281 people (12.5%) who were 65 years of age or older. The median age was 39.9 years. For every 100 females, there were 97.4 males. For every 100 females age 18 and over, there were 94.6 males.

There were 21,027 housing units at an average density of 1,867.9 per square mile (721.2/km^{2}), of which 12,627 (62.6%) were owner-occupied, and 7,554 (37.4%) were occupied by renters. The homeowner vacancy rate was 0.8%; the rental vacancy rate was 4.7%. 36,464 people (62.5% of the population) lived in owner-occupied dwelling units and 21,501 people (36.9%) lived in rental dwelling units.

== Economy ==
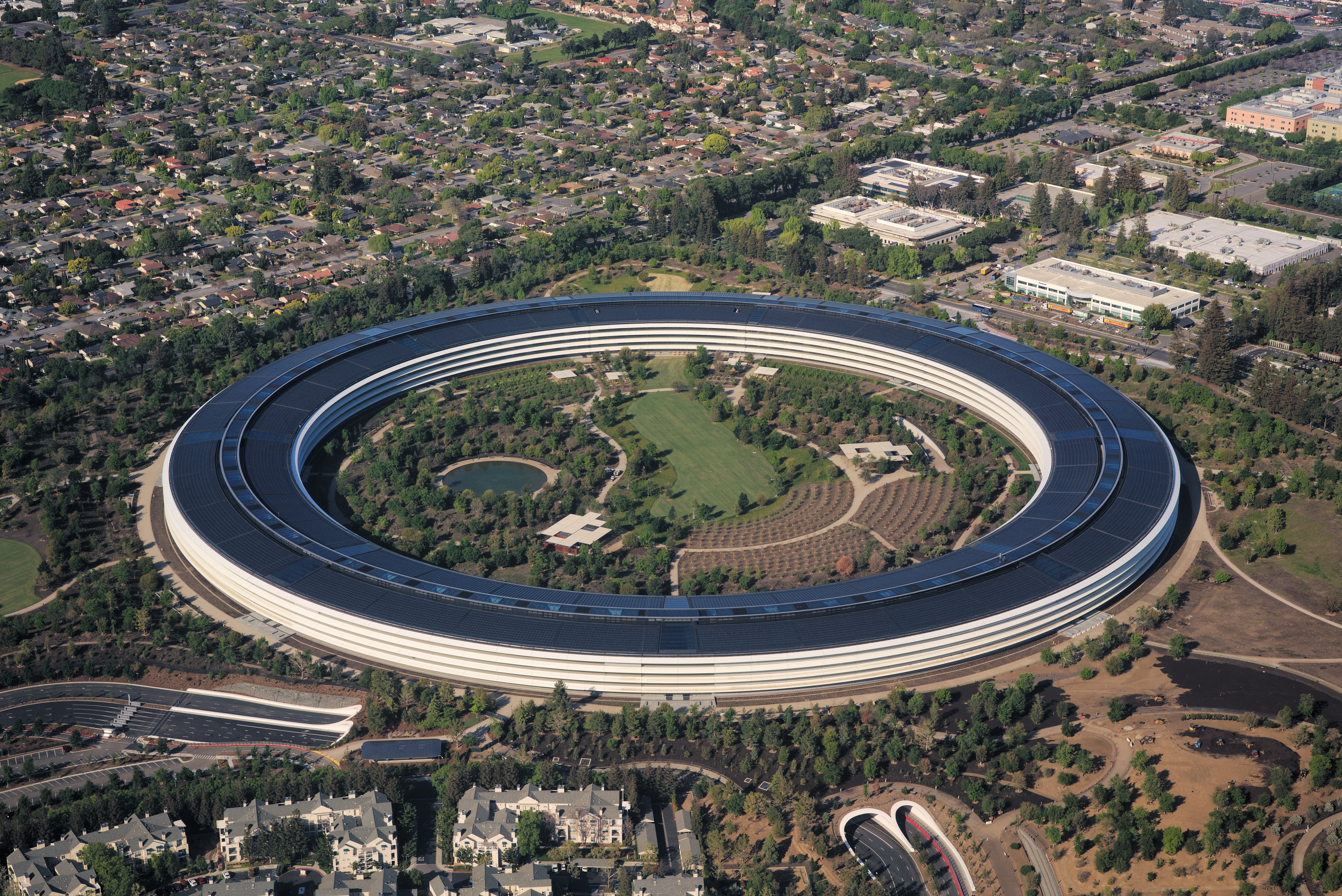
The headquarters of Apple on Apple Park Way in Cupertino

Cupertino is one of many cities that claim to be the "heart" of Silicon Valley, as many semiconductor and computer companies were founded there and in the surrounding areas. The new worldwide headquarters for Apple is located there in a modern circular complex. It is a 150-acre (610,000 m^{2}) campus between Interstate 280, N Wolfe Rd, E Homestead Rd and along Tantau Ave one mile east of the old campus. The nine properties (50-acre (0.2 km^{2})) south of Pruneridge Avenue were bought in 2006, the property (100-acre (0.4 km^{2}) north of it in 2010 (from Hewlett-Packard).

On June 7, 2011, Steve Jobs gave a presentation to Cupertino City Council, detailing the architectural design of the new building and its environs. The campus houses 13,000 employees in one central four-story circular building surrounded by extensive landscaping, with parking mainly underground and the rest centralized in a parking structure.

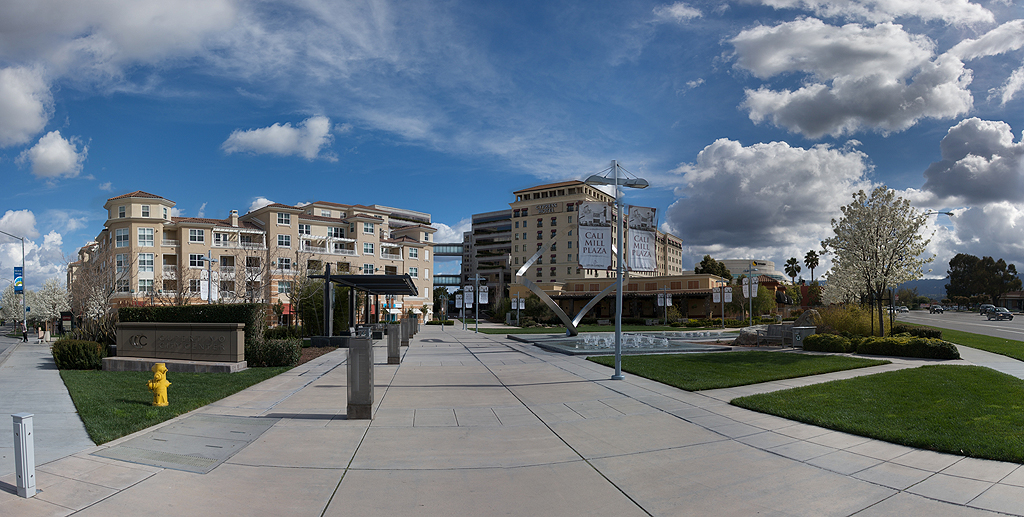
Cali Mill Plaza, containing the Cypress Hotel and various restaurants

In 2002, Cupertino had a labor force of 25,780 with an unemployment rate of 4.5%. The unemployment rate for Santa Clara County as a whole was 8.4%.

One of the major employers in the area is the aggregate rock quarry and cement plant in the foothills to the west of Cupertino, the Permanente Quarry. Owned and operated by Lehigh Southwest Cement, it was founded by Henry J. Kaiser as the Kaiser Permanente Cement Plant in 1939. It provided the majority of the cement used in the construction of the Shasta Dam. It supplied the 6 million barrels (950,000 m^{3}) of cement over a nine-mile (14 km)-long conveyor system. The cement plant is the sole reason for the railroad line that runs through the city.

=== Top employers ===
According to the city's 2022–23 Comprehensive Annual Financial Report, the top employers in the city are:

#	Employer
1	Apple
2	De Anza College
3	Force 5 Software Inc
4	Whole Foods Market
5	Claris International, Inc
6	Health Care Center at the Forum
7	Target
8	Cupertino Union School District
9	City of Cupertino
10	Mist Systems, Inc.
11	Intero Real Estate Services, Inc
12	Keller Williams Realty
13	Cupertino Healthcare & Wellness Center
14	Exilant
15	BJ's Restaurant & Brewhouse
16	Sunny View Retirement Community
17	Insight Solutions Inc
18	Cupertino High School
19	Monta Vista High School
20	Nexsales Corp

== Government ==
The city seal of Cupertino from 1999 to 2007

Cupertino was incorporated in 1955. The highest body in the city government – the City Council – is made up of five members who serve overlapping, four-year terms. The council elects the mayor and vice-mayor for a term of one year. The city does not have its own charter. Instead, it is a General Law city, which follows provisions and requirements for cities established by the state of California.

Cupertino contracts with the Santa Clara County Sheriff's Office and the Santa Clara County Fire Department for public safety services. The Cupertino Library is part of the Santa Clara County Library System.

In the California State Legislature, Cupertino is in the 13th senatorial district, represented by Democrat Josh Becker, and in the 26th Assembly district, represented by Democrat Patrick Ahrens.

In the United States House of Representatives, Cupertino is in California's 17th congressional district, represented by Democrat Ro Khanna.

== Education ==
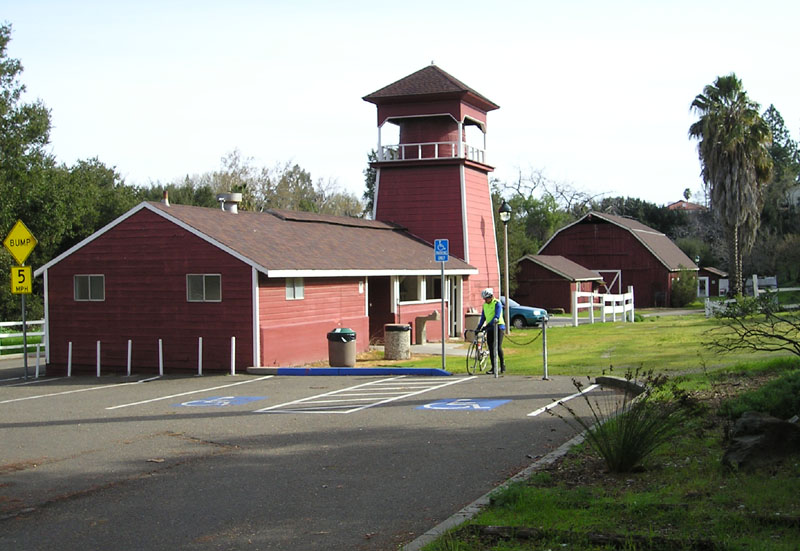
McClellan Ranch Preserve

Santa Clara County Library operates the Cupertino Library, which is located adjacent to city hall. The library, which was redesigned and rebuilt in 2004, is the busiest branch in the Santa Clara County Library system, with about 3 million items circulated annually.

The San Francisco Japanese School, a weekend educational program for Japanese citizen children living abroad, holds classes at J.F. Kennedy Middle School in Cupertino, as well as Harker, a private school.

=== Primary and secondary ===
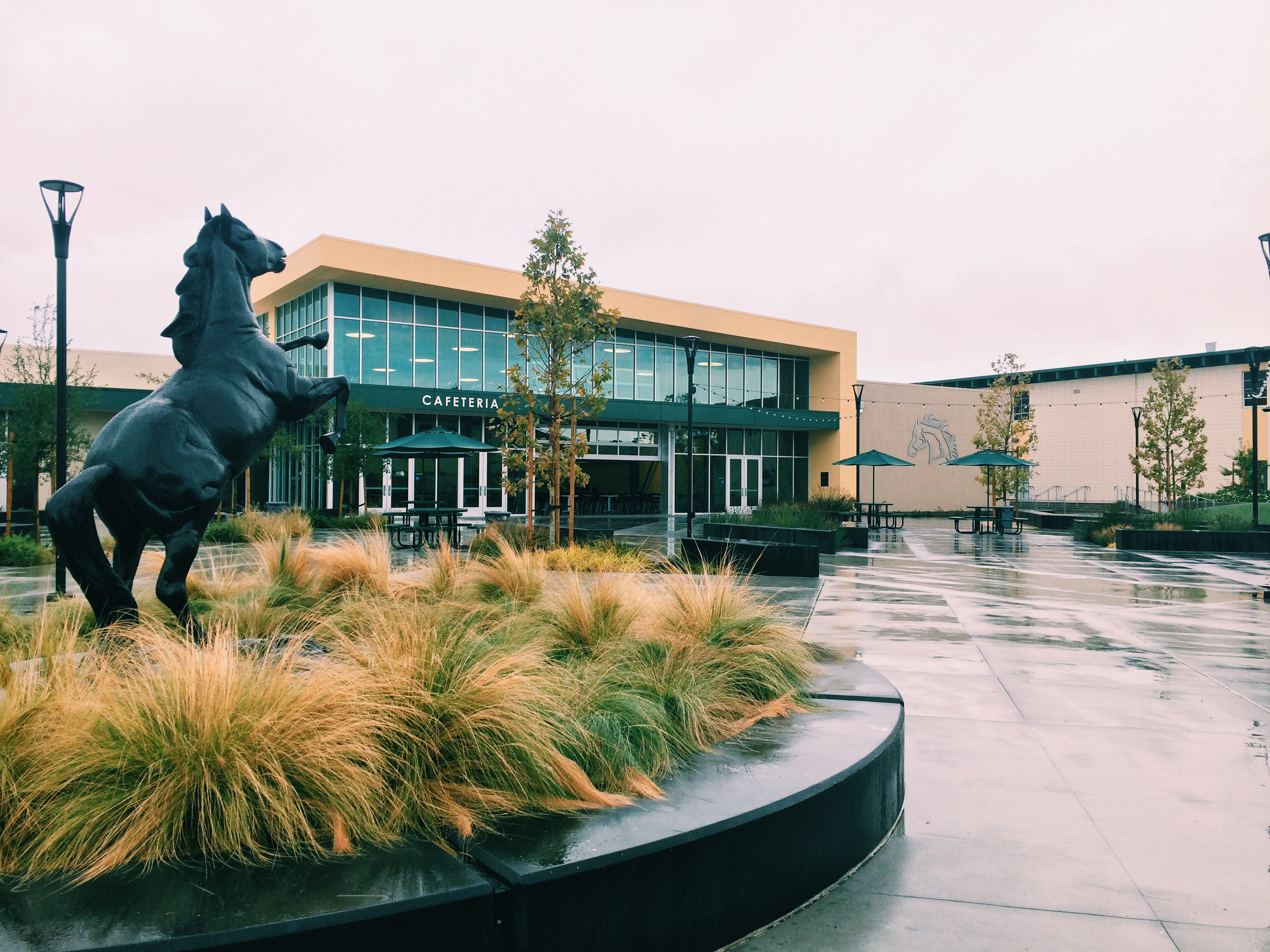
Homestead High School

Primary (K-8) public schools are organized into the Cupertino Union School District, while the Fremont Union High School District is responsible for high school students (except for a tiny portion of the northeast corner of the city which belongs to the Santa Clara Unified School District). Cupertino High School and its feeder school, Hyde Middle School, are located in the Rancho Rinconada section of Cupertino, while Monta Vista High School and its feeder, Kennedy Middle School, are in the Monta Vista neighborhood in the western half of Cupertino. Lawson Middle School feeds mostly Cupertino and Monta Vista High. In addition, Homestead High School is located in the northwestern portion of Cupertino, along the city border with neighboring Sunnyvale.

=== Colleges and universities ===
Cupertino is home to De Anza College, one of the two community colleges in the Foothill–De Anza Community College District. The University of San Francisco has satellite campuses in Cupertino.

== Transportation ==
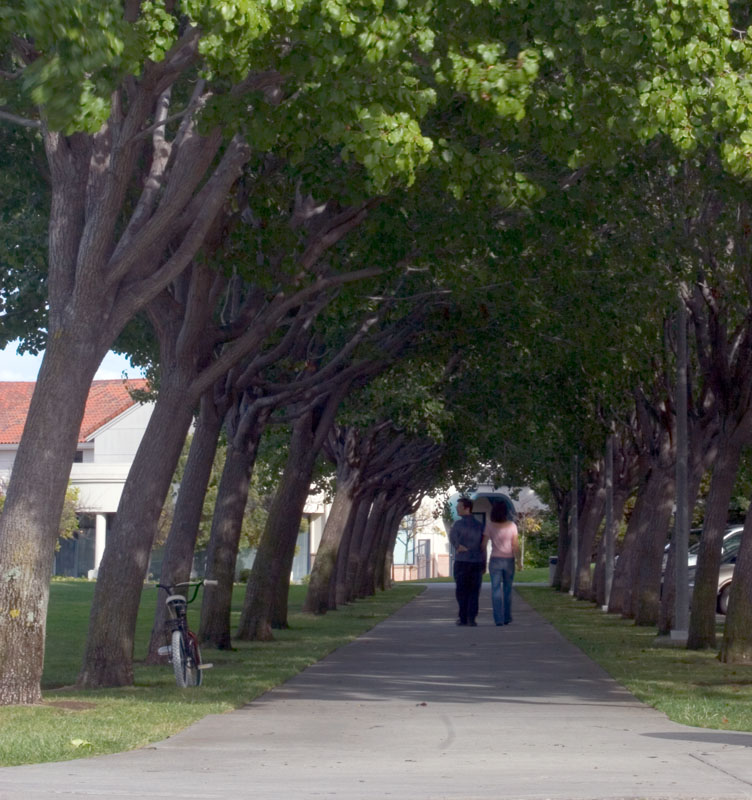
Cupertino Memorial Park

The city is served by an interconnected road system. Two freeways, State Route 85 and Interstate 280, intersect in Cupertino, with multi-lane boulevards with landscaped medians and traffic lights at all major intersections. Almost all streets have sidewalks; the few exceptions are in unincorporated pockets at the city's edges, which are maintained directly by Santa Clara County.

Cupertino has bike lanes on many of its boulevards, and has an extension of the Stevens Creek Trail through McClellan Ranch Park and Blackberry Farm. Bicycle traffic is heavy usually around morning and noon times around DeAnza College. The VTA has buses running through Cupertino at major arteries. Cupertino's main streets are well lit, while a few older roads towards the Monta Vista High School area are a little dim.

Cupertino is served by VTA bus routes 23, 25, 51, 53, 55, 56, and Rapid 523.

Dedicated on April 30, 2009, Cupertino opened the Mary Avenue Bicycle Footbridge, the first cable-stayed bicycle-pedestrian bridge over a California freeway. This bridge connects the north and the south sections of the Stevens Creek Trail. The cost of the bridge project was $14,800,000.

The Union Pacific Railroad operates a branch line track up to the Lehigh Permanente Cement Plant from the mainline at San Jose Diridon Station. It is, however, strictly for the quarry and very little to no non-quarry traffic runs there.

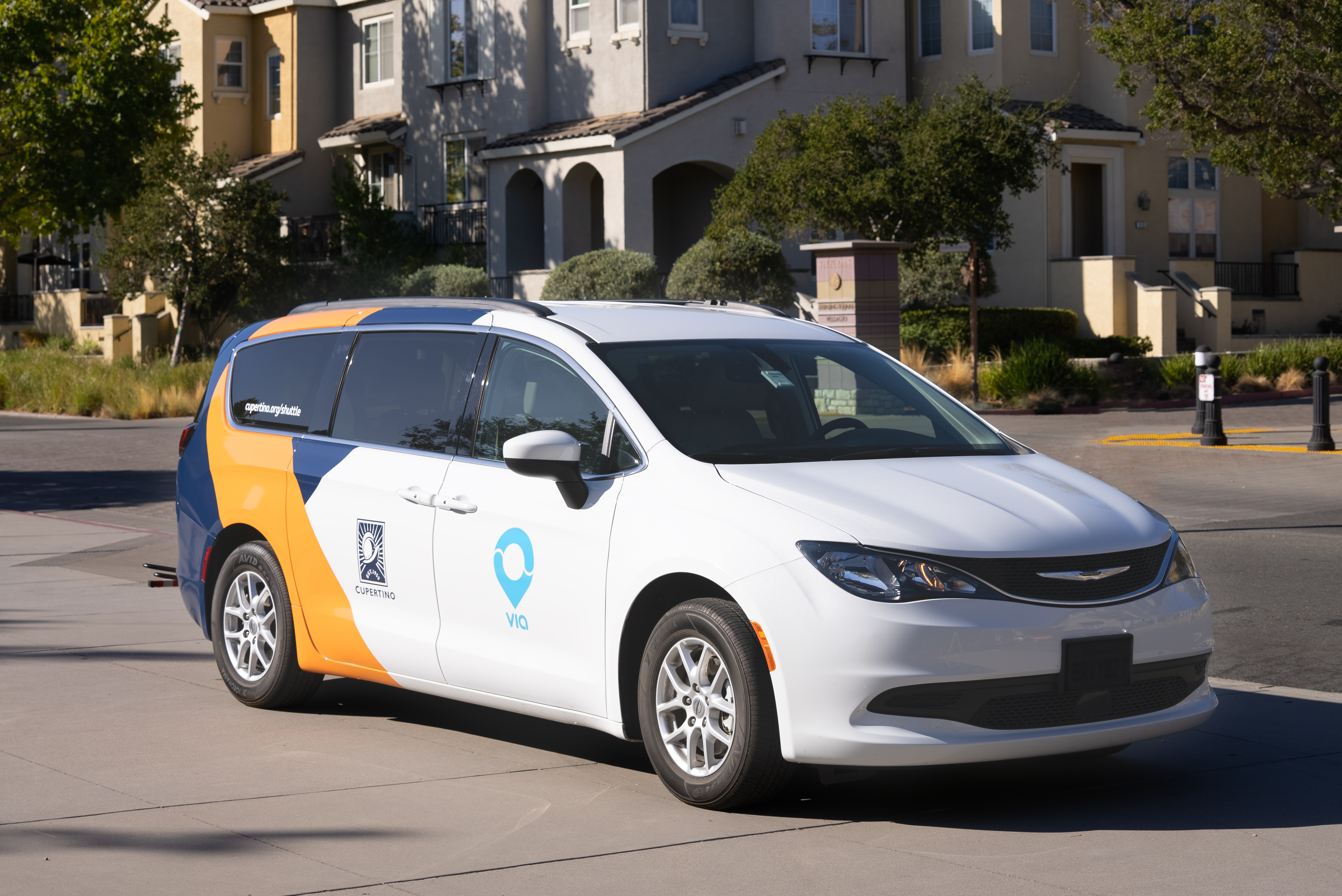
Public transit in Cupertino is powered by Via Transportation and utilizes on-demand shuttles.

There is no commuter rail or light rail service in the city. Caltrain commuter rail runs through the cities to the north and east, and the Santa Clara Valley Transportation Authority (VTA)'s Mountain View – Winchester light rail line runs to Campbell, California to the south. Bus service is also provided by VTA, and the prospect of a twenty-four-hour bus service on Stevens Creek Boulevard is being studied. Cupertino is also served by VTA's 523 Rapid bus, which runs from northern Sunnyvale and the Caltrain station to Downtown San Jose with limited stops and signal priority.

Cupertino is landlocked and relies on the Port of Oakland for most oceangoing freight.

Passenger and cargo air transportation is available at San Jose International Airport in San Jose. The closest general aviation airport is in Palo Alto; it is known as Palo Alto Airport of Santa Clara County.

The City of Cupertino partnered with Via Transportation in October 2019 to launch a new on-demand public transportation network. Unlike traditional bus networks that rely on routes and schedules, the new microtransit service called Via allows riders to hail a shared ride on demand through a smartphone app. The transit network serves the entire City of Cupertino with a satellite zone surrounding the Sunnyvale Caltrain station for commuters.

== Notable people ==
- Matthew Axelson – Navy SEAL
- Kris Bubic – baseball player
- Redmond Burke – pediatric heart surgeon
- Raymond Carver – writer and poet
- Aaron Eckhart – actor
- Scott Erickson – baseball player
- Paul Fong – California politician
- Dan Gladden – baseball player and broadcaster
- Clark Glasson – golf course architect
- Adyashanti – spiritual teacher
- Mark Tapio Kines – film director, writer, producer
- Patria Jafferies – businesswoman; co-founder of Dôme
- Steve Jobs – co-founder of Apple
- David Kramer – soccer player
- Ronnie Lott – College and Pro Football Hall of Famer
- Bryan Mantia – drummer
- Kurt Rambis – basketball player and coach
- Josiah Little Pickard – school administrator
- Adam Peters – NFL executive
- Daniel Puder – mixed martial arts fighter
- Fred Sablan – musician
- Charlie Tagawa – Japanese-American musician
- Khyri Thomas – basketball player
- Savita Vaidhyanathan – politician
- Elizabeth Lowe Watson – leader in the California Equal Suffrage Association
- Sandy Wihtol – baseball player
- Steve Wozniak – co-founder of Apple
- Cliff Yiskis – NASCAR driver

== Sister cities ==
Cupertino is twinned with:

- Copertino, Italy
- Bhubaneswar, India
- Hsinchu, Taiwan
- Toyokawa, Japan

=== Friendship cities ===
Cupertino also has friendly relations with:

- Jiangmen, China
- Jilin City, China
- Luoyang, China
- Shenzhen, China
- Taichung, Taiwan
- Taipei, Taiwan
- Tongxiang, China
- Xianning, China
- Yilan City, Taiwan
- Zhaoqing, China
- New Taipei, Taiwan
