= Cupertino Union School District =

School district in California, US

Address
- 1309 South Mary Avenue Sunnyvale, California, 94087; United States

District information
- Grades: K–8
- Superintendent: Stacy Yao
- Schools: 17 elementary (K-5) schools, 5 middle (6-8) schools, and 1 K-8 school
- Budget: ~$259,000,000 annually
- NCES District ID: 0610290

Students and staff
- Students: 13,587 (2024–2025)
- Teachers: 616.61 (FTE)
- Staff: 704.97 (FTE)
- Student–teacher ratio: 22.03:1

Other information
- Website: www.cusdk8.org

The Cupertino Union School District (abbreviated as CUSD) is a school district in Santa Clara County, California. CUSD's jurisdiction covers the communities of Cupertino, San Jose, Sunnyvale, Santa Clara, Saratoga, and Los Altos. CUSD operates seventeen elementary schools (K-5) and five middle schools (6–8), and one (K-8) school. It is a feeder for the Fremont Union High School District.

== History ==
The Cupertino Union School District traces its roots back to 1917, when the four original one-room school districts in Cupertino—San Antonio, Lincoln, Doyle, and Collins—consolidated to form a unified district. The earliest school building associated with the area, however, dates to 1867, reflecting the community's long-standing commitment to education.

During the first half of the 20th century, CUSD grew steadily alongside Cupertino's transition from a rural orchard region to a suburban community. The post-World War II housing boom and the incorporation of Cupertino in 1955 spurred significant population growth, leading to the rapid expansion of elementary schools and the eventual addition of middle schools to serve the increasing number of families in the area.

Over time, the district expanded its jurisdiction beyond Cupertino to include portions of Sunnyvale, San Jose, Saratoga, Los Altos, and Santa Clara. By the early 21st century, CUSD had become one of the largest elementary school districts in California, reflecting both the area's demographic shifts and its reputation for academic excellence.

== Governance ==
The Cupertino Union School District is governed by a five-member elected Board of Education, which sets policy, approves the budget, and hires and evaluates the superintendent. Trustees are elected at-large to four-year, staggered terms in general elections.

The board members include:

- Jerry Liu – Board President
- Satheesh Madhathil – Board Vice President
- Sylvia Leong – Board Clerk
- Ava Chiao – Board Member
- Long Jiao – Board Member

The Board annually elects its officers - president, vice president, and clerk - who preside over meetings and drive governance. Meetings occur twice monthly and are open to the public in adherence with California's Brown Act. Members of the public may participate during designated public comment periods.

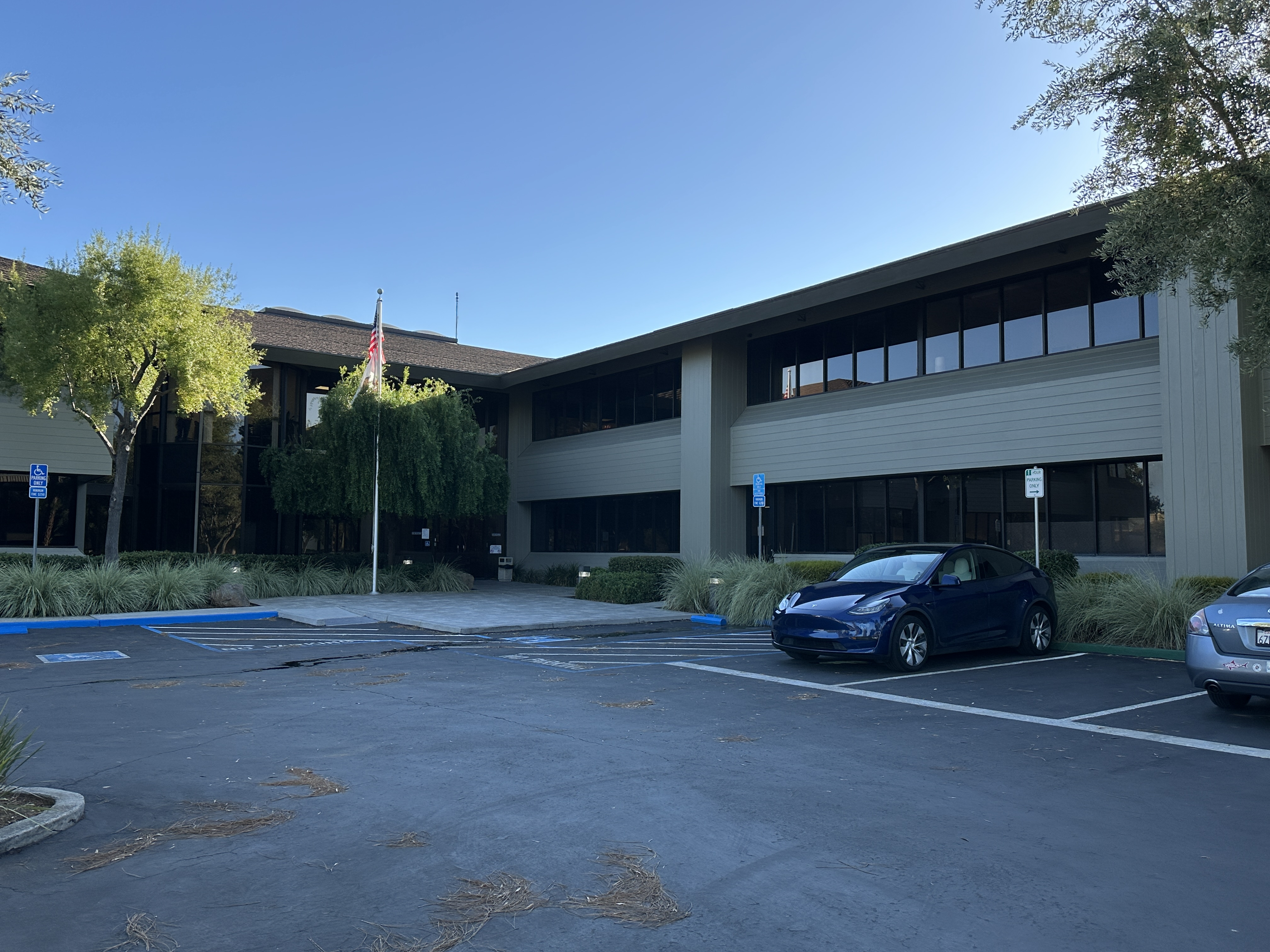
District office in Sunnyvale, California

The superintendent, as the district's chief executive, implements Board policy and oversees daily operations, supported by a cabinet including leadership in educational services, business services, human resources, and other operational areas.

CUSD also includes advisory bodies such as the Community Advisory Committee for Special Education and the District English Learner Advisory Committee (DELAC), offering targeted input on programs for specific student populations.

== Awards and Recognitions ==
- In 2023, fourteen Cupertino Union School District elementary schools were recognized as California Distinguished Schools by the California Department of Education.
List of 2023 California Distinguished Schools in CUSD
- Abraham Lincoln Elementary (Cupertino)
- Blue Hills Elementary (Saratoga)
- C. B. Eaton Elementary (Cupertino)
- D. J. Sedgwick Elementary (Cupertino)
- Dwight D. Eisenhower Elementary (Santa Clara)
- Garden Gate Elementary (Cupertino)
- John Muir Elementary (San Jose)
- L. P. Collins Elementary (Cupertino)
- Montclaire Elementary (Los Altos)
- Murdock-Portal Elementary (San Jose)
- Nelson S. Dilworth Elementary (San Jose)
- West Valley Elementary (Sunnyvale)
- William Faria Elementary (Cupertino)
- William Regnart Elementary (Cupertino)
- In 2024, Joaquin Miller Middle School was named a National Blue Ribbon School by the U.S. Department of Education; it was one of three schools in Santa Clara County to earn the award that year.
- Also in 2024, Kennedy Middle School won the Science Olympiad National Tournament (Division B) for the second consecutive year (“back-to-back” champions).
- In 2026, The Education Magazine featured Cupertino Union School District in an article titled "Cupertino Union School District: Building a Future Where Every Child Thrives", describing the district's academic performance, strategic priorities, and whole-child education efforts.
- In a 2026 Education Opportunity Project report, Cupertino Union ranked 4th of 10,205 U.S. districts in average math performance and 60th of 10,076 districts in average reading performance for the 2022–2025 school years.

== Notable Events ==
Superintendent's Award

The Superintendent's Award is a recognition program created by CUSD in 2022 to honor students and staff who exemplify the district's “Portrait of a Learner” competencies. Students may be recognized as Effective Communicators (clear expression, active listening, audience awareness) or Inclusive Collaborators (empathy, respect, teamwork). Staff honorees are acknowledged for passion, loyalty, commitment, and ownership of their work.

State of the District

Beginning in the 2021–22 school year, CUSD has hosted an annual State of the District event to update the community on district priorities, finances, student achievement, and strategic goals.

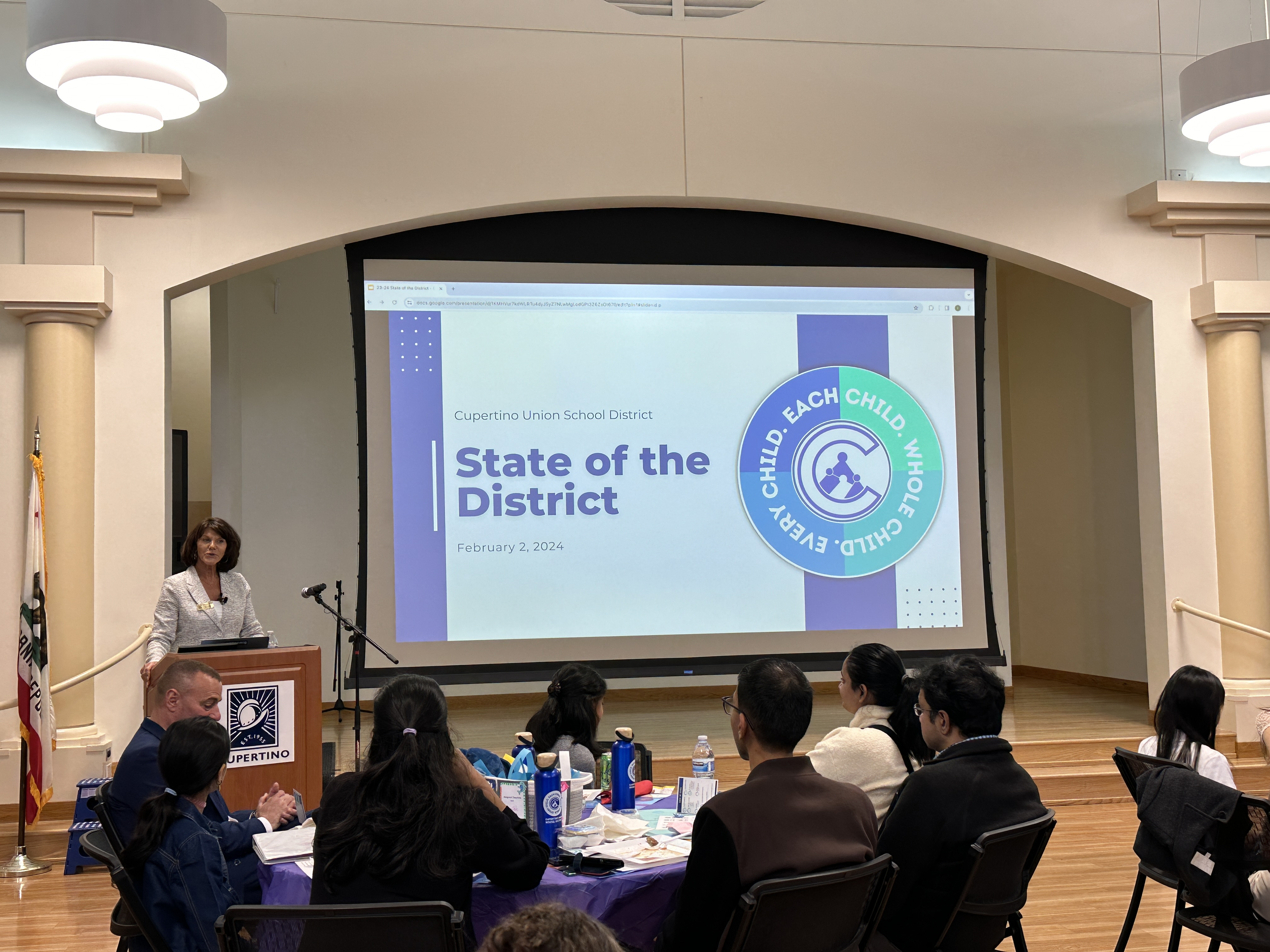
2024 CUSD State of District event

Key highlights from these reports include:

2021–22: Launched “Portrait of a Learner” as a districtwide framework; outlined early post-pandemic recovery and social–emotional learning supports.
2022–23: Presented balanced budget projections and student achievement data; emphasized expanding dual-language and STEM programs.
2023–24: Reported progress on literacy and math interventions, facility upgrades, and professional development for teachers.
2024–25: Focused on fiscal sustainability, enrollment trends, and implementation of updated instructional materials.

== Schools ==
Colloquial names of schools are in bold.

=== Elementary schools (K-5) ===
- **Blue Hills Elementary School**, Saratoga.
- L. P. **Collins Elementary School**, Cupertino.
- Manuel **De Vargas Elementary School**, San Jose.
- Nelson S. **Dilworth Elementary School**, San Jose.
- C. B. **Eaton Elementary School**, Cupertino.
- Dwight D. **Eisenhower Elementary School**, Santa Clara
- **Garden Gate Elementary School**, Cupertino.
- Abraham **Lincoln Elementary School**, Cupertino.
- **Montclaire Elementary School**, Los Altos.
- John **Muir Elementary School**, San Jose.
- Chester W. **Nimitz Elementary School**, Sunnyvale.
- D. J. **Sedgwick Elementary School**, Cupertino.
- **Stevens Creek Elementary School**, Cupertino.
- Louis E. **Stocklmeir Elementary School**, Sunnyvale.
- **West Valley Elementary School**, Sunnyvale.
- William **Faria Elementary School**, Cupertino.
- **Murdock-Portal Elementary School**, San Jose.

=== Middle schools (6-8) ===
- **Cupertino Middle School**, Sunnyvale.
- Warren E. **Hyde Middle School**, Cupertino.
- John F. **Kennedy Middle School**, Cupertino.
- Sam H. **Lawson Middle School**, Cupertino.
- Joaquin **Miller Middle School**, San Jose.

=== Alternative program schools ===
- Cupertino Language Immersion Program (**CLIP**), San Jose (K-8; located on the campus of Muir Elementary School for K-5 and on the campus of Miller Middle School for 6–8)
- Christa **McAuliffe School**, Saratoga (K-8)
- **Murdock-Portal (Portal) Elementary School**, San Jose (K-5; formerly known as Carol Murdock Elementary School until closed in 1980. Reopened as Murdock-Portal when the Portal Elementary School was closed, and the students and teachers moved to the Murdock location.)

=== Closed schools ===
- Calabazas Creek Elementary (closed after 1974–1975 school year; demolished)
- Doyle School (demolished in 1980; now Barrington Bridge neighborhood)
- C. B. Eaton Elementary School (closed in 1983, later reopened and currently operating)
- Fremont Older Elementary School (closed 1994; demolished, acquired by Cupertino through Measure T along with Black Berry Farm, now Creekside Park)
- Grant School (closed 1979, mostly demolished for new homes; a portion is now Grant Park and a few original buildings serve as Grant Park Community Center)
- Hansen Elementary School (closed in 1979; reopened and now Christa McAuliffe School)
- Herbert Hoover Elementary School (closed 1981, demolished; now Hoover Park and accompanying homes)
- Inverness Elementary School (closed 1978, demolished; now part of Sunnyvale Birdlands neighborhood)
- Jollyman Elementary School (closed after 1981–1982 school year; demolished for construction of new houses (Jollyman Park))
- Luther Elementary School (closed 1982; retained by district as reserve campus; buildings now leased to private schools with attached field serving as a neighborhood park)
- R. I. Meyerholz Elementary School (closed 2022 due to declining enrollment)
- Monta Vista Elementary School (now Monta Vista Park; a few buildings remain and are used by Cupertino as an auxiliary Recreation Center)
- Carol Murdock Elementary School (closed 1980; reopened 1995 when the Portal alternative program was moved, making room for the Collins Elementary transition and build out of Lawson Middle School on the Collins site).
- Nan Allen School (closed; retained by district as reserve campus; now utilized half by district to house the TRC (Teacher Resource Center) and half leased out)
- Ortega Junior High School (facilities merged with adjoining Stocklmeir Elementary School)
- Panama School (closed 1978, demolished; now Panama Park)
- Portal Elementary School, including Nan Allen School on same site (closed 1983, now reopened as Collins Elementary School)
- William Regnart Elementary School (closed 2022 due to declining enrollment)
- San Antonio School (closed 1974 or soon after, now San Antonio Park and South Peninsula Hebrew Day School; one of four original one room school houses in CUSD, later moved to Astoria site in Sunnyvale before closing)
- Serra Elementary School (closed 1981; retained by district as reserve campus; buildings now leased to private schools with adjoining park leased to city)
- Laura B. Stichter School (closed after 1977–1978 school year; demolished)
- Earl Warren Elementary School (closed 1975; now Jenny Strand Park, Santa Clara)
- Wilson Elementary School (closed 1975, demolished; now Wilson Park)
- Zarevich Site (Prune & Apricot orchard land purchased from Antone Zarevich family. Agricultural land that was purchased for a new school site during enrollment growth, but never developed into school site. Later sold, near current-day Interstate Freeway 280 and Lawrence Expy adjacent to 5301 Stevens Creek/Agilent Campus).

== Legal matters ==
In 2004, Stevens Creek Elementary School was involved in the federal lawsuit Williams v. Vidmar, concerning a dispute over the use of religious materials in a classroom.
