= Food Bank Latvia =

Organization based in Latvia

Food bank For a Fed Latvia is a charity program in Latvia, which grew as one of the solutions of the 2008 financial crisis in Latvia in 2009.

Charity program "For a Fed Latvia" is held by Charitable organisation Ziedot.lv which is a charity portal that provides the possibility for individuals and companies to use the Internet to implement their desire to help those in need. It also offers a convenient and secure way to donate to carefully selected and approved charity projects, to follow project development and to be sure that the donation will reach its target.

Due to high unemployment and economic crisis, many people turn to Ziedot.lv every day, for assistance in job-seeking in order to provide for their families.

== Description ==
The charity program "For a Fed Latvia" was founded in September 2009 with the aim of supporting people who cannot afford everyday meals. The food bank initiative collects donations in order to provide monthly food packages to people in need.

The cost of one food package does not exceed LVL 8.50 and typically includes products intended to provide families with daily meals, such as 1 kg of grits or pearl barley, 1 kg of rice or buckwheat, 1.5 kg of oat flakes, 1 kg of grey peas, 0.5 kg of pasta, 2 kg of flour, 1 L of oil, one can of meat or fish, 1 kg of sugar, 0.4 kg of milk powder, 120 g of stock cubes and 30 g of tea.

The project was established in cooperation with regional charitable organisations, the Latvian Association of Samaritans, advertising agency DDB Worldwide, and the international public relations agency Nords Porter Novelli. The project's logistics expenses were supported by the Soros Foundation Latvia.

Food banks operate in many countries around the world. Examples include Food Banks Canada, Food Bank For New York City, and Food Bank of Delaware.

== See also ==
- Food loss and waste
- Food security
- Poverty
- List of food banks
