= Feeding America =

US nonprofit organization and food bank network

- Formation: 1979; 47 years ago (as America's Second Harvest)
- Founder: John van Hengel
- Type: Non-profit
- Tax ID no.: 36-3673599
- Headquarters: 161 North Clark Street Suite 700, Chicago, Illinois, U.S.
- Coordinates: 41°53′11″N 87°37′36″W
- Region served: United States
- Members: 200 food banks
- CEO: Claire Babineaux-Fontenot
- Main organ: Board of directors
- Revenue: $3.574 billion (2021)
- Website: feedingamerica.org

Feeding America (formerly America's Second Harvest) is a United States-based non-profit organization that is a nationwide network of more than 200 food banks that feed more than 46 million people through food pantries, soup kitchens, shelters, and other community-based agencies. Forbes ranks it as the largest U.S. charity by revenue. Feeding America was known as America's Second Harvest until August 31, 2008.

== History ==
In the mid-1960s, during rehabilitation in Phoenix, Arizona, after a paralyzing injury, John van Hengel began volunteering at a local soup kitchen. He solicited food donations and ended up with far more food than the kitchen could use. Around this time, one of the clients told him that she regularly fed her children with discarded items from a grocery store garbage dumpster. She told him that the food quality was fine, but that there should be a place where unwanted food could be deposited and later withdrawn by people who needed it, like a bank.

Van Hengel began to actively solicit unwanted food from grocery stores, local gardens, and nearby citrus groves. His effort led to the creation of St. Mary's Food Bank in Phoenix, the nation's first food bank.

In 1975, St. Mary's was awarded a federal grant to assist in developing food banks across the nation. This effort was formally incorporated into a separate non-profit organization in 1976.

In 2001, America's Second Harvest merged with Foodchain, which was the nation's largest food-rescue organization at that time.

In 2005, Feeding America began using an internal market with a synthetic currency called "shares" to more rationally allocate food. Currency is allocated based on the need, and then individual banks bid on which foods they want the most, based on local knowledge and ability to transport and store the food offered. Negative prices are possible, so banks could earn shares by picking up undesirable food. The previous centrally planned system had penalized banks for refusing any food offered, even if it was the wrong type to meet their needs, and this resulted in misallocations ("sending potatoes to Idaho"), food rotting away in places that did not need it, and the wrong types of food being delivered (e.g. not matching hot dogs with hot dog buns).

In May 2007, it was featured on American Idol, named as a charity in the Idol Gives Back charity program.

In September 2008, the organization renamed America's Second Harvest to Feeding America.

In August 2009, Columbia Records announced that all U.S. royalties from Bob Dylan's album Christmas in the Heart would be donated to Feeding America, in perpetuity.

There has been a rise in people suffering from hunger after the 2008 financial crisis and the Great Recession. In 2013, the USDA reported that about 49 million U.S. Americans faced poor nutrition, about one in six of the population. In September, they launched Hunger Action Month, with events planned all over the nation, to raise awareness and get more U.S. Americans involved in helping out.

In 2015, Feeding America saved more than 2 billion pounds (~907 thousand metric tons) of food that would have been thrown away otherwise, but could instead be distributed to hungry families.

In 2018, the USDA announced that food insecurity had been steadily declining since the 2009 recession ended.

In 2020, Feeding America said that there were about 11 million children suffering from hunger in the United States. Children, along with families and seniors having trouble making ends meet, were suffering the most.

The COVID-19 pandemic increased hunger levels and the number of people in need of food banks. According to Patti Habeck, the President of Feeding America Eastern Wisconsin, the number of people increased by 36% at the height of the pandemic and had not yet decreased until autumn of 2021.

Feeding America created the MealConnect platform in 2014, which helps food donors like grocery stores, restaurants, and caterers to connect with local food banks and pantries. The platform helps to reduce food waste and increase the efficiency of food donations. In June 2020, Feeding America expanded MealConnect's operations nationwide.

== Leadership ==
The current CEO is Denis McDonough, as of April 14, 2026. Prior leaders include Claire Babineaux-Fontenot (2018-2026),Diana Aviv (2015-18), with Matt Knott as interim-CEO in 2015, Bob Aiken (2012-2015), and Vicki Escarra (2006-2012).

== Network programs ==
Feeding America works to educate the general public and keep them informed about hunger in America. The national office produces educational and research papers that spotlight aspects of hunger and provides information on hunger, poverty and the programs that serve vulnerable Americans. Feeding America's public policy staff works with legislators, conducting research, testifying at hearings and advocating for changes in public attitudes and laws that support Feeding America's network and those the organization serves.

In 2017, Feeding America announced a plan to increase the nutritional value of food from food banks. By 2023, the group plans to offer more fruits and vegetables, and provide training so they can distribute more produce, whole grains and lean proteins.

There are more than 200 Feeding America food banks, each of which works in its own area. A complete and current list is available at the Feeding America web site. Food banks in the network include:

- Alameda County Community Food Bank in Oakland, California
- Arkansas Foodbank Network in Little Rock, Arkansas
- Capital Area Food Bank in Washington, D.C.
- Community Action Services and Food Bank in Provo, Utah
- Connecticut Food Bank in East Haven, Connecticut
- Feeding Southwest Virginia in Salem, Virginia
- Food Bank of Alaska in Anchorage, Alaska
- Food Bank For New York City in New York City
- Food Bank of Contra Costa and Solano in Concord, California and Fairfield, California
- Food Bank of Delaware in Delaware
- Foodbank of Southeastern Virginia and the Eastern Shore
- Food Lifeline in Seattle, Washington
- Forgotten Harvest in Metro Detroit
- Freestore Foodbank in Cincinnati, Ohio
- Good Shepherd Food Bank in Maine
- Greater Boston Food Bank in Boston, Massachusetts
- Greater Chicago Food Depository in Chicago, Illinois
- Houston Food Bank in Houston, Texas
- Maryland Food Bank in Baltimore, Maryland
- New Hampshire Food Bank in Manchester, New Hampshire
- North Texas Food Bank in Dallas, Texas
- Philabundance in Philadelphia, Pennsylvania
- Redwood Empire Food Bank in Northern California
- Second Harvest Food Bank of Middle Tennessee in Nashville, Tennessee
- Second Harvest North Florida in Jacksonville, Florida
- Second Harvest of Silicon Valley in San Jose, California
- St. Mary's Food Bank in Phoenix, Arizona
- United Food Bank in Mesa, Arizona
- Vermont Foodbank in Barre, Vermont

== See also ==
- List of food banks
- Second Harvest Toronto (Canada)
