= Food Bank of Alaska =

U.S. nonprofit organization

- Formation: August 17, 1979; 47 years ago
- Type: Nonprofit
- Headquarters: Anchorage, Alaska, U.S.
- Region served: Statewide
- Members: 150+ agency partners
- CEO: Cara Durr
- Affiliations: Feeding America
- Website: foodbankofalaska.org

Food Bank of Alaska is a nonprofit hunger-relief organization based in Anchorage, Alaska. Founded in 1979, it is a member of Feeding America and distributes donated and purchased food through a network of more than 150 partner agencies statewide. It participates in major seasonal distributions, such as annual Thanksgiving Blessing events in Anchorage.

== History ==
Food Bank of Alaska was incorporated in 1979 by Anchorage church volunteers who sought to reduce food waste and improve access to food across the state. Early founders included Mary Jane Landstrom, who served as the first board president, and other community leaders committed to salvaging surplus food that would otherwise go to waste.

In its first full year, the organization distributed 47,470 pounds of food to 22 partner agencies. By its 25th anniversary in 2004, Food Bank of Alaska had expanded to serve dozens of communities statewide, laying the foundation for a broader anti-hunger network.

Food Bank of Alaska has been part of the Feeding America network since at least 2006, when the national Hunger in America study included the organization as a participating food bank.

Leadership has shifted over the decades. Susannah Morgan served as executive director from 2001 to 2012, a period when the food bank scaled operations significantly, expanded USDA commodity programs, and extended services from Anchorage into rural communities. She departed in 2012 to become CEO of Oregon Food Bank. Michael Miller succeeded her from 2012 to 2015, followed by Jim Baldwin from 2015 until 2021. In 2022, Cara Durr became CEO, bringing a background in public policy and advocacy to the role.

As demand for food assistance has grown, the food bank has continually scaled up. In 2025, the organization reported distributing 10.1 million pounds of food statewide. Media coverage in 2024 and 2025 documented rising need, logistical challenges in shipping food to rural Alaska, and the food bank's role in public discussions about federal SNAP and Medicaid cuts.

== Programs ==
Food Bank of Alaska coordinates or participates in several programs:

- The Emergency Food Assistance Program (TEFAP) and other USDA commodity distributions.
- Commodity Supplemental Food Program (CSFP), also called Senior Boxes, which provide monthly food packages to eligible seniors.
- Meals to You delivering shelf-stable meals to children in rural communities, administered by the Alaska Department of Education and Early Development.
- Mobile food distributions in Anchorage and surrounding communities.
- Thanksgiving Blessing holiday meal distributions run with faith and community partners.
- SNAP Outreach and Education, providing application assistance and raising awareness about eligibility for the Supplemental Nutrition Assistance Program. The organization has also participated in public discussions about federal food assistance changes.
- Summer Meals and After-School Programs, working with schools and community sites to ensure children have consistent access to food outside of school days.
- Double Up Food Bucks in partnership with the Alaska Farmers Market Association, which allows SNAP participants to stretch their benefits on local produce.
- Community Food Drives and Fund Drives, including seasonal efforts such as Anchorage Restaurant Week and the Trick or Eat Halloween campaign.

== Operations ==
The organization operates a warehouse and distribution hub in Anchorage that serves as the central site for storage, sorting, and redistribution of donated and purchased food. Food is sourced from grocery retailers, wholesalers, producers, the fishing industry, farmers, USDA programs, and community food drives. Local reporting has noted rising demand for mobile distributions in Anchorage.

In 2025, Food Bank of Alaska reported distributing 10.1 million pounds of food through more than 150 partner agencies.

Operating in Alaska presents unique logistical challenges due to the state's geography and reliance on long-distance shipping. In 2025, Food Bank News reported that the organization successfully managed a large-scale food shipment under a compressed deadline, highlighting the complexity of distributing food to rural communities across the state.

== Community engagement ==
Food Bank of Alaska relies on thousands of volunteers each year, including students, retirees, and community groups. In 2025, local coverage highlighted Anchorage high school students volunteering to pack food for distribution. One Anchorage woman was reported to have devoted nearly 600 hours annually to volunteering with the organization.

National volunteer initiatives have also intersected with the food bank's work, including 2025 Seattle Seahawks and Safeway week of service focused on food insecurity in Alaska that raised $12,000 for the organization.

The organization has also hosted large volunteer groups, including service members during Alaska's first Navy Week in 2025.

== Advocacy and emergency response ==
Food Bank of Alaska has been active in advocacy related to food insecurity and public assistance. In 2025, the organization joined other nonprofits in raising concerns about proposed federal funding cuts that could reduce food access for Alaskans. That same year, Alaska Public Media covered its participation in statewide discussions on how the proposed "One Big Beautiful Bill" might affect SNAP and Medicaid benefits.

In 2026, Food Bank of Alaska coordinated emergency food assistance following several overlapping disruptions, including Typhoon Halong, delays in the Supplemental Nutrition Assistance Program benefits, and increased food costs. The State of Alaska allocated $4 million to the food bank for emergency food sourcing and distribution. By mid-April 2026, the organization had distributed more than 72,000 shelf-stable food boxes through food banks and pantries, with each box containing 14 meals.

Food Bank of Alaska has also prepared for rapid surges in demand during times of federal uncertainty. In February 2025, local reporting noted the organization's readiness to respond to increased food need if mass federal layoffs occurred.

== Events and fundraising ==
The food bank coordinates several annual fundraising and awareness campaigns. Canstruction Anchorage, part of the national Canstruction charitable competition, invites teams to build large structures from canned food that is later donated. In 2026, Food Bank of Alaska's CANstruction event returned for its 17th year. The organization also participates in Thanksgiving Blessing, an annual holiday meal distribution organized with faith groups, businesses, community partners, and volunteers. Since 2024, it partnered with Anchorage restaurants for Anchorage Restaurant Week, formerly known as Dine Out Against Hunger, which combines local dining promotions with donations to fight hunger.

== Impact ==
According to Feeding America's Map the Meal Gap, about 1 in 7 Alaskans experienced food insecurity in 2023. Local reporting has documented a steady rise in food insecurity across Alaska. In December 2024, Alaska Public Media reported that the food bank continued to experience record levels of demand, with the need even higher than the previous year's record distributions. The Anchorage Daily News also noted in September 2024 that more Anchorage residents were relying on food assistance programs. Demand remained elevated into 2026, as the organization and its partner network responded to increased food need connected to high food costs, benefit disruptions, and emergency conditions affecting Alaska communities.

== See also ==
- Feeding America
- List of food banks
- Food security in the United States
