= Gleaners =

Gleaners Inc.
- Formation: 1986
- Type: Individual and Family Social Services
- Legal status: Non-profit organization
- Location: 237 Briarwood Dr Jackson, MS 39206 (601) 956-4740
- Chief Executive Officer: Michael Williams
- Main organ: Board of Directors
- Budget: $50,000 - $60,000
- Staff: No salaried employees; volunteers only
- Website: gleanersjackson.com

Gleaners, Inc., also known as The Volunteers Of Gleaners, is a Jackson, Mississippi-based non-profit organization founded by Gloria Martinson in 1986 (not to be confused with the Gleaners Food Bank in Indiana, a non-profit organization which helps feed families struggling with hunger and food insecurity in central and southeast Indiana, or Gleaners in Michigan). It salvages food that otherwise would go to waste and redistributes it to other non-profit shelters in the metro area. Claude Mapp is the current CEO and Nancy Willis is the director of operations.

== Gloria Martinson ==
Gloria Martinson (born May 27, 1929, in the United States) is the founder of Gleaners in Jackson, Mississippi.

Gloria Lorraine Martinson is the widow of Mike Martinson, founder, and CEO of the Dobbs Maynard Advertising Agency, who was often referred to as "The King Maker" due to his strong political influence and clout. Her sister-in-law is State Representative Rita Martinson (Madison, Mississippi) and her brother-in-law, Billy Martinson, is the founder of Green Oak Nursery in Jackson, Mississippi. She is the grandmother of the television actress Lauren Jones.

In 2001, Martinson was honored with the title of "2001 Mississippi Ageless Hero Award" by the American politician Ronnie Musgrove.

== History ==
Gleaners has been in operation since 1986. Martinson started the organization from her kitchen. The amount of food collected and distributed has increased through 2015, with food intake and outgo nearing one million pounds. The cost per pound of food collected and distributed is about ten cents pound. Gleaners had about sixty volunteers.

The Volunteers of Gleaners in Jackson, Mississippi, collects food that otherwise would go to waste and gives it to charitable agencies. Donated food comes from wholesale food distributors, retail establishments such as supermarkets, restaurants, and bakeries, as well as hospitals and churches. The food is then distributed to charities caring for indigent elderly, to daycare centers, halfway houses, and shelters, at no cost to them.

== Operations ==
Gleaners is an all-volunteer, nonprofit agency overseen by a board of directors. They have a fleet of seven trucks for collecting food from donors, and operate from a building equipped with a walk-in refrigerator and freezer, tables for re-packaging of donated food, and sinks for cleaning of equipment. With total expenses less than $60,000 per year, they receive no government funding, and all operating expenses for vehicles, food packaging, utilities, fuel and insurance come from private individuals, foundations, churches, and non-governmental grants. Some 60 volunteers serve Gleaners each year, driving the trucks and preparing food for distribution.

== The Need ==
Food distribution is based on numbers and characteristics of persons served in each shelter. Over 50 agencies share food donations based on need, so that Gleaners can provide food to charitable agencies that care for the poor, the homeless, the mentally ill and the chemically addicted. Most involved charities pick up food donations once or twice a week, while some get a daily food distribution.
