= Humanitarian League of Delaware =

- Abbreviation: HLD
- Formation: 2010
- Type: Non-profit
- Purpose: Humanitarian Organization
- Headquarters: Cambridge, Massachusetts
- Region served: Delaware, Massachusetts, Internationally
- Leader: Austin Osborne, Jaewoong Yoo

The Humanitarian League of Delaware is a student-run, nonprofit organization founded in 2009 by Austin Osborne and Jaewoong Yoo at the Charter School of Wilmington. The group participates in many humanitarian activities in the Delaware community and internationally. In April 2011, the group packaged and shipped 11,166 meals to Haiti with the help of Stop Hunger Now. Austin Osborne has also received the Prudential Spirit of Community Award for his work with the Humanitarian League of Delaware.

The Humanitarian League of Delaware has also organized many projects such as weekly volunteering at the Food Bank of Delaware, sending holiday cards to American troops, and delivering flowers to mothers who lost a family member due to violence in the City of Wilmington. HLD delivered the flowers to 13 mothers on Mother's Day, 2010 with the help of SAGE (Survivors Addressing Grief Easement).

It has been featured in the News Journal, public access television and on WDEL radio.
