= List of food banks =

This is a list of notable food banks. A food bank is a non-profit, charitable organization that distributes food to those who have difficulty purchasing enough to avoid hunger, usually through intermediaries like food pantries and soup kitchens. Some food banks distribute food directly with their own food pantries.

== List of food banks ==
=== International ===
- Bishop's storehouse – Commodity resource in the Church of Jesus Christ of Latter-day Saints
- Canstruction – U.S. nonprofit organization
- Midwest Food Bank – U.S. charity

=== Australia ===
- FareShare (Australia) – Australian not-for-profit organisation
- Gift of Bread – Australian charitable organisation
- OzHarvest – Australian social entrepreneur
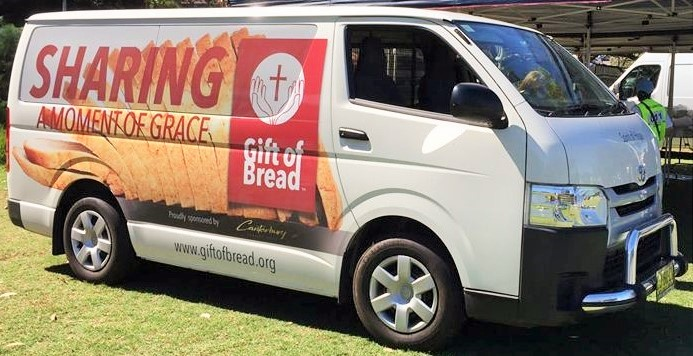
A Gift of Bread van named "Spirit of Hope"

=== Canada ===
- Daily Bread Food Bank – Canadian charity
- Food Banks Canada – Canadian charitable organization
- Greater Vancouver Food Bank – Non-profit organization in British Columbia, Canada
- Ontario Association of Food Banks – Canadian food bank

=== China ===
- Feeding Hong Kong – Food bank in Hong Kong

=== Colombia ===
- Food Bank (Bogotá)

=== Germany ===
- Volxküche

=== India ===
- Delhi Food Banking Network – Food bank system in India

=== Israel ===
- Leket Israel – Israel-based charity

=== Latvia ===
- Food Bank Latvia – Organization based in Latvia

=== Malaysia ===
- Kechara Soup Kitchen – Malaysian nonprofit organization

=== New Zealand ===
- Foodbank Canterbury

=== Nigeria ===
- iCare Foodbank – Food bank in Nigeria
- Lagos Food Bank – Food bank in Nigeria

=== Singapore ===
- Food Bank Singapore – Singaporean charity

=== United Kingdom ===
- Independent Food Aid Network – UK network of independent food aid providers
- Sufra (charity) – Organization based in the United Kingdom
- The Trussell Trust – British food bank charity

=== United States ===
- Feeding America – US nonprofit organization and food bank network
- Freestore Foodbank – U.S. non-profit organization

Alaska

- Food Bank of Alaska – U.S. nonprofit organization

==== Arizona ====
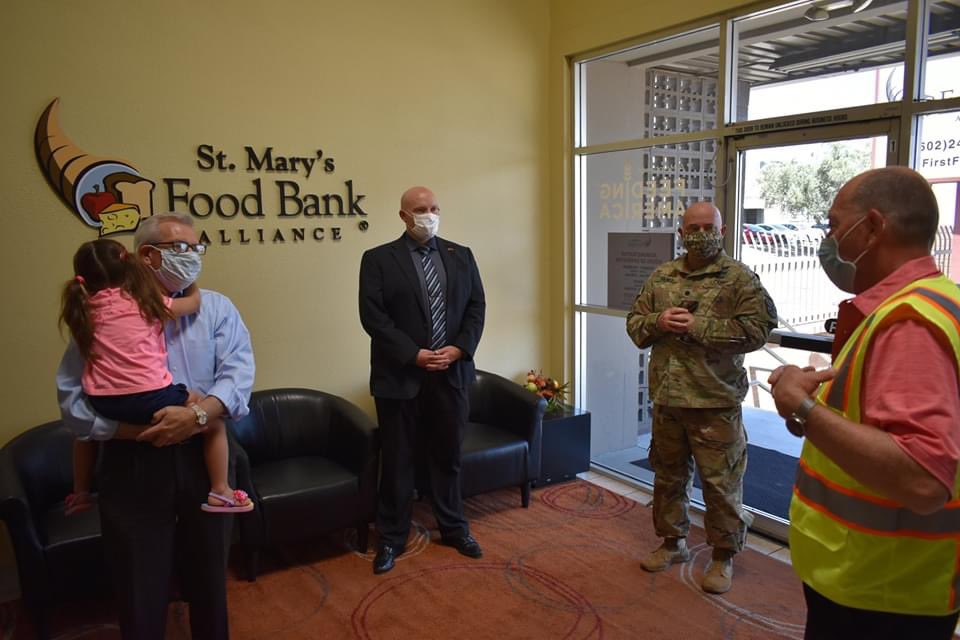
Congressmember David Schweikert visiting the St. Mary's Food Bank Alliance during the 2020 COVID-19 pandemic

- The 3000 Club – Phoenix-based charity
- Northern Arizona Food Bank – American televangelist (1939–2024)
- St. Mary's Food Bank Alliance – Food bank in Phoenix, Arizona, U.S.
- United Food Bank - Food bank in Mesa, Arizona

==== Arkansas ====
- Arkansas Foodbank – U.S. non-profit food bank

==== California ====
- Ag Against Hunger – Non-profit food bank in California, U.S.
- Alameda County Community Food Bank – US non-profit organization
- Food from the 'Hood – Non-profit organization
- Meet Each Need with Dignity – American nonprofit organization
- Redwood Empire Food Bank
- Second Harvest of Silicon Valley – Food bank in California, US

==== Connecticut ====
- Connecticut Food Bank – US nonprofit organization

==== Delaware ====
- Food Bank of Delaware – Non-profit organization in Delaware, United States
- Philabundance – U.S. non-profit organization

==== Florida ====
- Second Harvest North Florida – U.S. nonprofit organization

==== Illinois ====
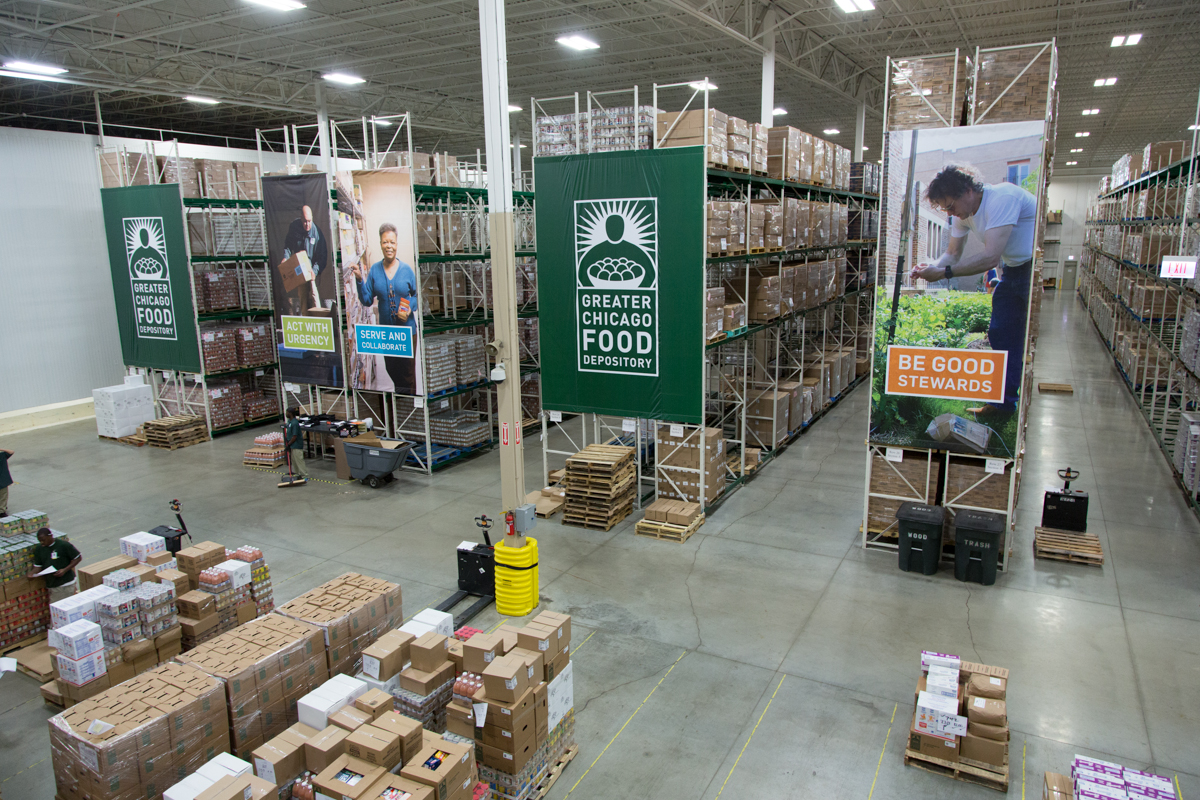
One of the Greater Chicago Food Depository's warehouses

- Greater Chicago Food Depository – American nonprofit organization
- Northern Illinois Food Bank – Non-profit organization in Illinois, US

==== Indiana ====
- Gleaners Food Bank – Food bank in Indianapolis, Indiana, US

==== Maine ====
- Good Shepherd Food Bank – Nonprofit organization in Maine, U.S.

==== Maryland ====
- Elizabeth House – Nonprofit food pantry in Maryland, U.S.
- Food Bank of Delaware – Non-profit organization in Delaware, United States
- Philabundance – U.S. non-profit organization

==== Massachusetts ====
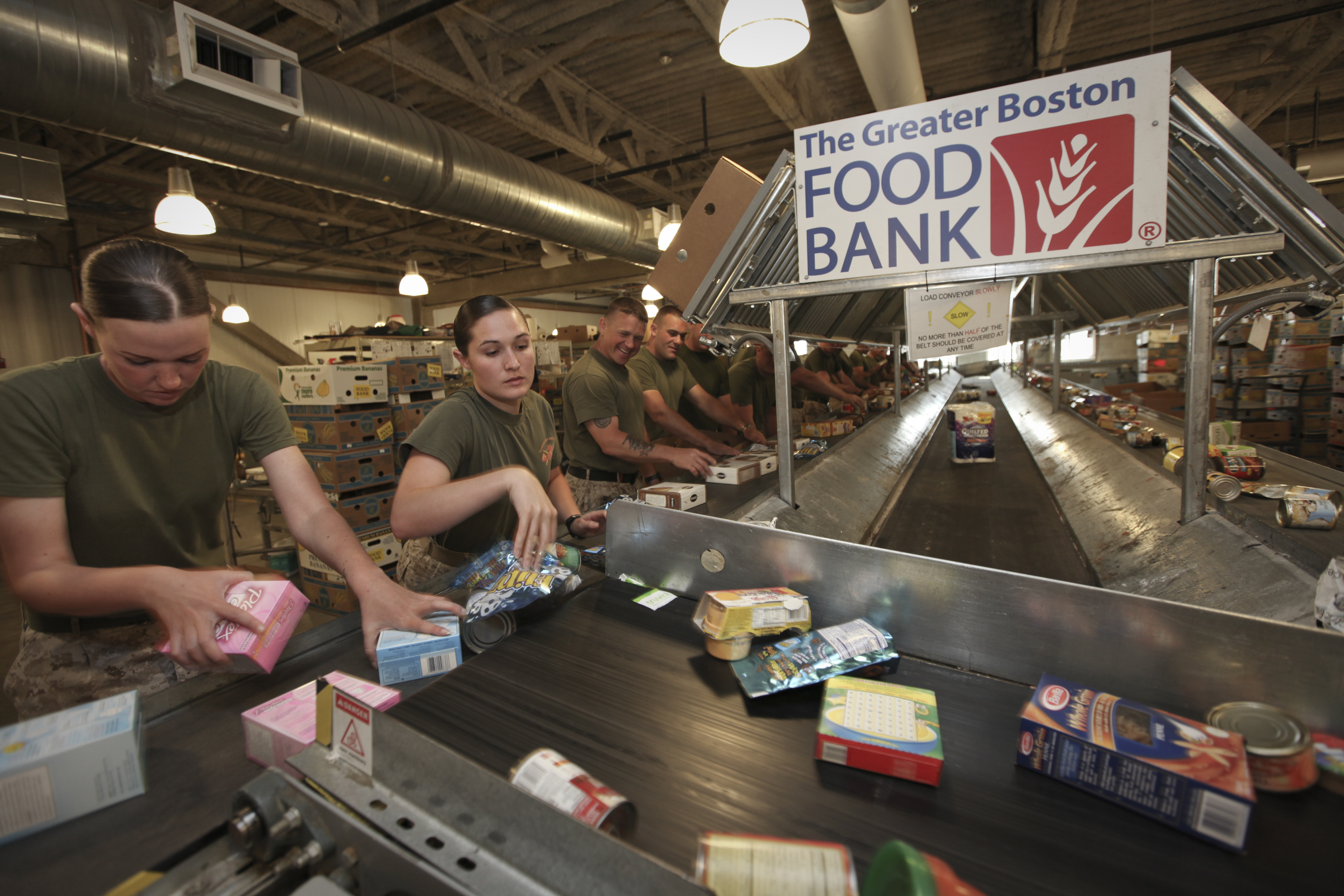
Officers of the Mobilization Command United States Marine Corps Reserve providing assistance to the Greater Boston Food Bank during a volunteer drive

- Greater Boston Food Bank – Non-profit organization in the US

==== Michigan ====
- Forgotten Harvest – Non-profit organization in Michigan, US

==== New York ====
- City Harvest – New York City food rescue organization
- Food Bank For New York City – US non-profit organization
- Interfaith Nutrition Network – U.S. non-profit organization

==== Oregon ====
- Oregon Food Bank – U.S. nonprofit organization

==== Pennsylvania ====
- Food Bank of Delaware – Non-profit organization in Delaware, United States
- Philabundance – U.S. non-profit organization

==== Texas ====
- Houston Food Bank
- North Texas Food Bank – Social-benefit organization in Plano, Texas, US

==== Utah ====
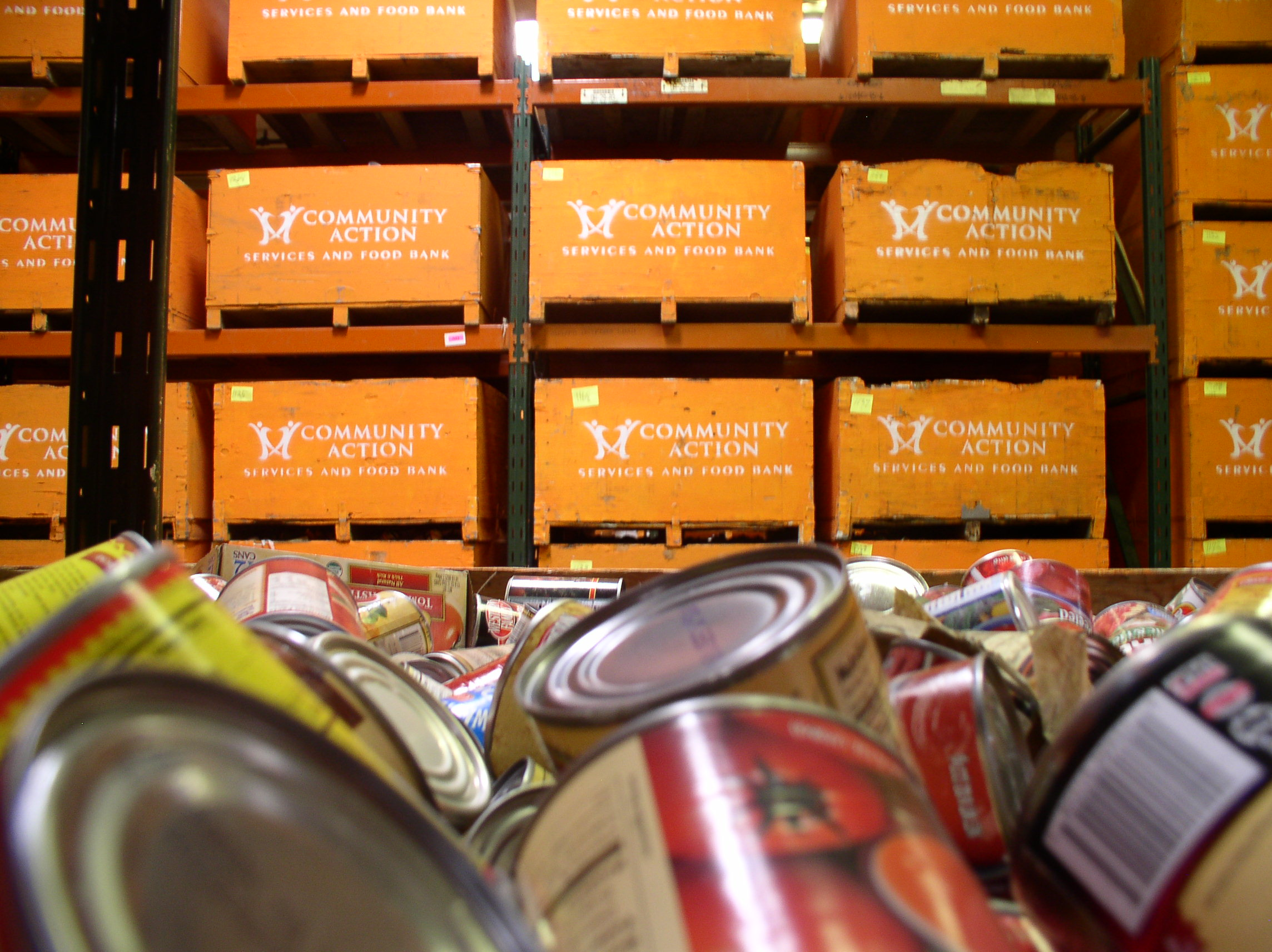
Products at Community Action Services and Food Bank in Provo, Utah

- Community Action Services and Food Bank – Non-profit organization in Utah, U.S.

==== Vermont ====
- Vermont Foodbank – American anti-hunger organization

==== Washington ====
- Food Lifeline – Non-profit organization in Washington, US
- Northwest Harvest – Food bank in Washington state, U.S.

==== Washington, D.C. ====
- Capital Area Food Bank – Nonprofit organization in Washington, D.C., U.S.
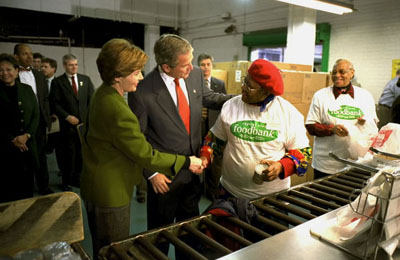
U.S. President George W. Bush visits the Capital Area Food Bank's Washington warehouse in 2002.

== See also ==
- Fans Supporting Foodbanks – Charitable initiative in Liverpool
- Food rescue – Recovery and donation of wasted edible food
- Food rescue initiatives which are not particularly directed at the poor
  - Foodsharing.de – public foodsharing shelves
  - Olio (app) – Food sharing app
  - Too Good To Go – Mobile application
- Food loss and waste – Food that is discarded, lost or uneaten
- Food security – Measure of food availability
- Soup kitchen – Place where food is available at no cost as charity
- List of charitable foundations
