= Independent Food Aid Network =

UK network of independent food aid providers

The Independent Food Aid Network (IFAN) is the UK network of independent food aid providers. Its membership includes over 550 independent food banks as well as other types of food aid provider. A charity since October 2018, IFAN supports and advocates on behalf of its member food aid organisations, collates independent food bank data, and campaigns for changes that would end the need charitable food aid in the UK through what is called a 'cash first' approach to food insecurity.

== History ==
The network was founded in 2016 based on learning from Canada and is the second largest network of food banks in the UK. The network's vision is of "a society without the need for charitable food aid and in which good food is accessible to all" and IFAN advocates for "an adequate social security system, as well as fair wages and job security."

In 2017, a list of independent food banks put together by Sabine Goodwin on behalf of the Independent Food Aid Network revealed the scale of food bank use in the UK at that time. The research found that, together with the largest network of UK food banks (the Trussell Trust) there were over 2,000 food banks regularly giving out emergency food parcels—meaning that, as reported by The Guardian, "the level of food bank use is far greater than headline figures indicate."

== Work ==
IFAN's work has been coordinated by Sabine Goodwin since 2018. In 2018, IFAN started to collate data from independent food banks in Scotland in collaboration with the A Menu for Change project. IFAN's data was used to extrapolate figures for UK-wide food bank use in the 2019 State of Hunger report. In January 2020, IFAN reported that 1,000 emergency food parcels were distributed in Scotland every day. Since the March 2020, IFAN has published data collated from independent food banks across the UK.

Alongside other groups, IFAN campaigned for the measurement of household food insecurity and in February 2019, DWP officials announced that food insecurity questions would be included in the annual Family Resources Survey. In October 2019, IFAN warned of the impact on food banks of a no-deal Brexit. In March 2020, IFAN reported on the impact of COVID-19 panic-buying on food banks. In November 2020, IFAN's now director, Sabine Goodwin, wrote in The Big Issue that food poverty is not about food and that Marcus Rashford's fight must not be a "missed opportunity" to end poverty for good.

In January 2021, the group wrote to the British Prime Minister to protest the "challenges and risks" posed to food bank volunteers during the pandemic, asking that the Government should not rely on charities "to fill the gaps left by holes in the social security system and inadequate wages." In August 2021, IFAN's Coordinator Sabine Goodwin wrote for the British Medical Journal, that following the policy decision to cut 20 pounds from Universal Credit, UK food banks are facing the "busiest and most difficult winter on record."

Since June 2020, the IFAN has co-produced 'Worrying About Money?' or cash first referral leaflets first in Scotland, and since the end of 2020 in England and Wales. By March 2024, IFAN has collaborated with local partners including local authority teams, advice providers and food banks to publish 'Worrying About Money?' resources in over 120 local authorities. IFAN produces leaflets as well as interactive, poster, easy read and audio versions.

IFAN champions a 'cash first' or income-focused approach to rising food insecurity. IFAN's director, Sabine Goodwin, sits on the Advisory Group for the Scottish Government's plan Cash First: Towards ending the need for food banks and IFAN's work to co-produce cash first referral leaflets is action six in this plan.

In 2020 and 2021, IFAN worked alongside Feeding Britain and University of York to co-produce a series of research webinars on Structural Inequalities and food bank use.

== Membership of wider alliances and campaigns ==
IFAN is a member of the following wider alliances and campaigns:

- End Child Poverty Coalition
- Scottish Food Coalition
- Disability Benefits Consortium
- Fight Inequality Alliance
- Global Network for Right to Food and Nutrition
- Global Solidarity Alliance for Food, Health and Social Justice
- Living Income Campaign
- Keep the Lifeline Campaign
- Plenty to Share
- All Kids Count
- Five Weeks too Long

== BMJ Annual Appeal ==
In December 2020 and January 2021, the BMJ ran their Annual Appeal to raise money for the Independent Food Aid Network. BMJ readers raised over £60,000 for the charity.

== See also ==
- List of food banks
