= Good Shepherd Food Bank =

Nonprofit organization in Maine, U.S.

Good Shepherd Food Bank is the largest hunger relief organization in the U.S. state of Maine, providing surplus and purchased food to more than 400 non-profit organizations throughout the state. In 2015, the Food Bank distributed 23 million pounds of food to its partner agencies.

The Food Bank's primary warehouse is located in Auburn, Maine. It operates another distribution center in Hampden, Maine. The food bank is a member of Feeding America (formerly America's Second Harvest, the nation's largest charitable hunger-relief organization, headquartered in Chicago, Illinois.

== History ==
Good Shepherd Food Bank began in 1981 out of the garage of JoAnn and Ray Pike. The idea came from reading a newspaper article about another food bank in Kansas that started soliciting goods from the food industry and sharing it with those in need. Initial funding came from a walk-a-thon held on April 12 (Palm Sunday), which raised only $6,000 but enough to continue operations. First food donors included Burnham & Morrell (B&M Beans) and Snows Clam Chowder, which was based in Pine Point, Maine.

In 1983 Hannaford Bros. Co. studied the process of retail companies contributing products to major food banks and made the decision to contribute its products to Good Shepherd Food Bank, to be distributed to non-profit agencies that feed low-income people. Hannaford established a reclamation center to facilitate the process of contributing products from the entire service area of Hannaford Bros. Co. In the past fiscal year, Hannaford Bros. Co. was the contributor of a full 50% of all the products received at the food bank.

The addition of Walmart Superstores, Shaw's Supermarkets, Barber Foods Co., Jordan Foods, Lepage Bakeries, Sure Winner Foods, and many smaller companies as food donors ensures a steady supply of highly nutritious foods for the people of Maine who are in the greatest need of balanced nutrition.

In 1981, the Pikes began distributing food by contacting local churches and a few programs in Lewiston-Auburn and the surrounding area. As the quantities of food increased, they reached further, adding the Portland and Augusta regions. Today, distribution of food to those in need is accomplished with the collaborative efforts of a network of more than 600 non-profit agencies.

As the Pikes continued to feed more people, donations of food were so plentiful, it wasn't long until the Food Bank had to move to a new location. Good Shepherd Food Bank moved from the Pike's home to 3,000 square feet (280 m^{2}) in the old Centennial Mill in Lewiston. The space had increased from 7,000 sq ft (650 m^{2})to 14,000 sq ft (1,300 m^{2}) to 21,000. Yet this space was inadequate and inappropriate for food storage. After an extensive search, in 1987 it was relocated to a 30,000 sq ft (2,800 m^{2}) former food warehouse on Lisbon St., and several years later 10,000 sq ft (930 m^{2}) was added in order to handle all the food. Renovations were done to construct a freezer and walk-in cooler.

By 1998, due to a need for increased capacity, the Board considered purchasing the building at 415 Lisbon Street. When inspections of the space confirmed that a section of the building was unsafe, the Board decided to abandon this site and construct a new warehouse. In July 2001, the Good Shepherd Food Bank had the great privilege of moving into a newly constructed warehouse, designed specifically for its operations. The facility has 53,000 square feet (4,900 m^{2}) of usable space, with a height of 34 feet (10 m) to accommodate larger quantities of food. The freezer holds 12 trailer truckloads of frozen foods and the cooler holds over 5 truckloads of fresh produce and dairy products.

In the past, the distance was a major obstacle for agencies located several hours away from the Food Bank's headquarters in Auburn; many felt they were not able to access adequate quantities of food. The organization addressed this problem, as well as its responsibility to serve the entire state of Maine, by establishing a distribution center in Brewer. This facility has since closed; however, a new distribution center in Hampden replaced it. The facility in Hampden now serves hundreds of agencies in seven counties in Northern and Downeast Maine.

As of October 2023, the food bank has provided 30 million meals.

== See also ==
- List of food banks
