= Delhi Food Banking Network =

Food bank system in India

Delhi Food Banking Network is a food bank system based in Delhi, India.

The populations being serviced by the Delhi FoodBank include school programs, charitable hospitals, orphanages, the destitute, beggars, homeless, faith based organisations and many others.

The Foodbank operates by matching food from donors to those that need this the most.

== See also ==
- List of food banks
