= Connecticut Food Bank =

US nonprofit organization

Connecticut Foodshare
- Type: Non-governmental organization
- Purpose: Hunger Relief, Environmentalism, Food Waste
- Headquarters: Wallingford, Connecticut
- Region served: Connecticut
- President and CEO: Jason Jakubowski
- Affiliations: Feeding America
- Volunteers: 8,000
- Website: https://www.ctfoodshare.org

Connecticut Foodshare is a nonprofit organization based in Wallingford, Connecticut. It serves as the sole food bank for all of Connecticut.

As a member of Feeding America, Connecticut Foodshare secures food donations from a national and regional network of food donors, retail partners, manufacturers, wholesalers and farms. Connecticut Foodshare supplies food to local agencies and programs (such as soup kitchens, food pantries, and emergency shelters). It serves more than 380,000 Connecticut residents (1 in 10) who struggle with hunger.

In 2019 Business.org ranked Connecticut Foodshare as the "Best Charity for Your Money in Connecticut" based on an analysis of data collected by organizations in every state by Charity Navigator.

== History and merger ==
The organization that is now Connecticut Foodshare started in 1982, when Mark Patten, a volunteer at Community Soup Kitchen in New Haven launched Connecticut Food Bank with a desk and chair supplied by Christian Community Action. It became an affiliate of Feeding America (then called America's Second Harvest) two years later.

On Jan. 27, 2021, the Wallingford-based Connecticut Food Bank merged with the Bloomfield-based Foodshare, Inc. The new entity was named Connecticut Foodshare. Board of directors for each organization voted to approve the merger after Connecticut Food Bank’s chief executive, Valarie Shultz-Wilson, left her job in February 2020 and the position remained unfilled for several months. As of early 2021, Connecticut Foodshare had 115 paid employees, a $110 million annual budget, and more than 8,000 volunteers. Its headquarters is in Wallingford, Connecticut.

== Leadership ==
Connecticut Foodshare is led by Jason Jakubowski, who has been the president & CEO of Connecticut Foodshare since the organizational merger in January 2021. Before joining Connecticut Foodshare, Jakubowski was Vice President of External Relations at the Hospital for Special Care, and Director of Corporate & Community Development at Charter Oak State College. Jakobowski has been an advocate for increased state funding for nonprofit organizations.

== Programs ==
=== Statewide food distribution ===
According to the Candid database (formerly Guidestar), Connecticut Foodshare distributed enough food in 2022 to provide nearly 37 million meals to its constituents.

=== Mobile food pantry ===
The Mobile Pantry program aids underserved communities, including those in "food deserts", by delivering food to those most vulnerable. These individuals may lack direct access to a supermarket or food pantry, or they might face challenges in reaching resources outside their neighborhood because of lack of transportation or physical limitations. With over 100 locations across Connecticut, Mobile Pantries offer produce and shelf-stable items for thousands of community members.

=== SNAP assistance ===
Connecticut Foodshare provides state residents with assistance in applying for the Supplemental Nutrition Assistance Program (SNAP). SNAP enrollment allows community members to choose their own groceries at the store and reduces reliance on food assistance from charitable sources.

=== Retail rescue ===
Connecticut Foodshare works with more than 300 food retailers to arrange food donations to nearby food pantries. The program helps build local relationships and allows the organization to more efficiently use its trucks and warehouse space.

=== "Thanksgiving For All" turkey giveaway ===
In November 2023, Connecticut Foodshare provided 50,000 turkeys to people in need in Connecticut.

== UConn support ==
In September of 2023, University of Connecticut basketball star Paige Bueckers teamed up with education company Chegg to donate $50,000 to the Connecticut Foodshare-affiliated pantry located on the UConn campus.

== See also ==
- List of food banks
