= Redwood Empire Food Bank =

Coordinates: 38.5139°N 122.7926°W

- Founded: 1991
- Tax ID no.: 68-0121855
- Location: Santa Rosa, California, United States
- Region served: Sonoma County; Lake County; Mendocino County; Humboldt County; Del Norte County
- Products: Food
- Services: Food bank Food distribution
- Method: Food banks Food distribution
- Key people: David Goodman, Executive Director
- Affiliations: Feeding America
- Revenue: $22,606,187 (2010-2011)
- Expenses: $21,684,447 (2010-2011)
- Website: www.refb.org

Redwood Empire Food Bank (REFB) is a food bank on the North Coast of California which belongs to the Feeding America network. Its mission is to end hunger in its community.

Founded in 1987, REFB is Sonoma County's largest hunger-relief organization, serving 133 charitable organizations, including emergency food pantries/closets, shelters and dining rooms, childcare centers/youth programs, group homes, and disaster relief agencies. Seniors, children, and working families come to food distributions seeking supplemental groceries.

REFB acquires food and distributes it through a network of charitable agencies and its own food assistance programs and also provides food to Lake, Mendocino, Humboldt, and Del Norte Counties through smaller food banks. In addition, the REFB advocates for legislation to provide long-term solutions to hunger in its community.

== Recipients ==
In 2018, The Redwood Empire Food Bank distributed the equivalent of 40 million meals, or 40,000 per day. Each year, the Redwood Empire Food Bank serves 82,000 people across five counties—Sonoma County, Lake County, Mendocino County, Humboldt County, and Del Norte County. A January 2010 report estimated that REFB was providing emergency food for over 110,000 different people annually, and that in any given week about 26,000 different people were receiving emergency food assistance. In late 2010, REFB was serving 78,000 monthly meals, an increase of more than 11 percent over 2009.

== Operations ==
=== Food collection and distribution ===
The vast majority of Redwood Empire Food Bank's work is direct service. Approximately 70% of the food distributed through the food bank goes out through 300+ pop-up food distributions each month. The remaining food is distributed through the Agency Shopping Program, which provides food to 170+ member charities that serve people in need.

The food bank's 2007 holiday food drive set a goal to collect 200,000 pounds (90,000 kg) of food and $160,000.

=== Education ===
The Redwood Empire Food Bank addresses the needs of low-income seniors living with diabetes through the Diabetes Wellness program.

In 2012, REFB began implementing a three-year, $800,000 project, funded by the Bristol-Myers Squibb Foundation, to address type 2 diabetes. The Diabetes Wellness Project provides food and educational materials to individuals, and conducts screenings. Much of the project is being done in partnership with Sonoma County healthcare providers.

=== 2013 expansion ===
In September 2011, Redwood Empire Food Bank purchased a 60,000-square-foot building near the Charles M. Schulz – Sonoma County Airport for $5 million. It opened the building after investing $2.5 million in renovations and improvements, including a 5,000-square-foot freezer and cooler, warehouse racking, truck docks and offices.

The new location also created a new "value marketplace" grocery store for low-income families, bringing dignity to the WIC and CalFresh shopping experience.

The building groundbreaking celebration was in October 2012. The new building is three times the size of the building that REFB had occupied since 1998, and opened in early 2013. The building also replaced three building spaces that REFB was renting.

=== Sources of donated food ===
The food bank distributes nearly $4.00 (wholesale value) worth of food for every $1 it spends.

- 55% donated fresh produce
- 17% donated groceries
- 10% purchased wholesale
- 15% USDA Commodities
- <5% Community Food Drives

In December 1998, Yoko Ono donated more than 33,000 pounds of in honor of her late husband, musician John Lennon.

=== Volunteers ===
Over 8,500 individuals volunteered in 2018, packing and sorting food, doing clerical tasks, driving trucks to pick up and deliver food, participating in special projects such as food drives and special events, and sharing their technological expertise. These volunteers filled the equivalent of more than 45 full-time staff positions.

== Funding ==
Organized as a 501(c)(3) Public Charity, the food bank reported total revenue of over $42 million for the fiscal year 2017–2018. Of this, less than $1.1 million came from government contracts.

- value of donated food (59%)
- individuals (17%)
- grants and foundation support (9%)
- corporate partnerships (6%)
- partner organizations (3%)
- government contracts (3%)
- community fundraisers (3%)

Member agencies contribute toward the cost of transporting and handling the food through shared maintenance fees for some of the food they select, which contribute nearly 6% of the Redwood Empire Food Bank's budget.

94% of Redwood Empire Food Bank's expenses go to its hunger-relief programs.

== See also ==
- List of food banks
