= Greater Vancouver Food Bank =

Non-profit organization in British Columbia, Canada

The Greater Vancouver Food Bank
- Founded: 1983; 43 years ago
- Registration no.: 107449787
- Headquarters: 8345 Winston St. Burnaby B.C. Canada
- Location: Vancouver, British Columbia
- Website: foodbank.bc.ca

The Greater Vancouver Food Bank is a Canadian registered charity located in Vancouver, British Columbia.

== History ==
The Greater Vancouver Food Bank (GVFB) was established in 1983 when organizations, church groups and concerned citizens joined together in response to the hunger crisis during the economic recession in 1981. The original purpose of the GVFB was to be a temporary social service provider. However, because the number of those at risk of hunger has continued to increase, the GVFB has become one of the most important non-government funded food assistance providers in Canada. In 1982, the GVFB assisted 200 people. Now, the GVFB is assisting over 16,000 individuals each month across Vancouver, Burnaby, New Westminster, and the North Shore.

== Internal Programs ==
=== Community Agency Partners ===
In addition to supporting individuals and families experiencing food insecurity through direct distribution, they also provide food support to over 100 Community Agency Partners (CAPs). CAPs include housing agencies, women and children’s shelters and after-school programs who in turn provide groceries, hot meals and snacks to thousands of people, including those who are unhoused.

== See also ==
- List of food banks
