= North Texas Food Bank =

Social-benefit organization in Plano, Texas, US

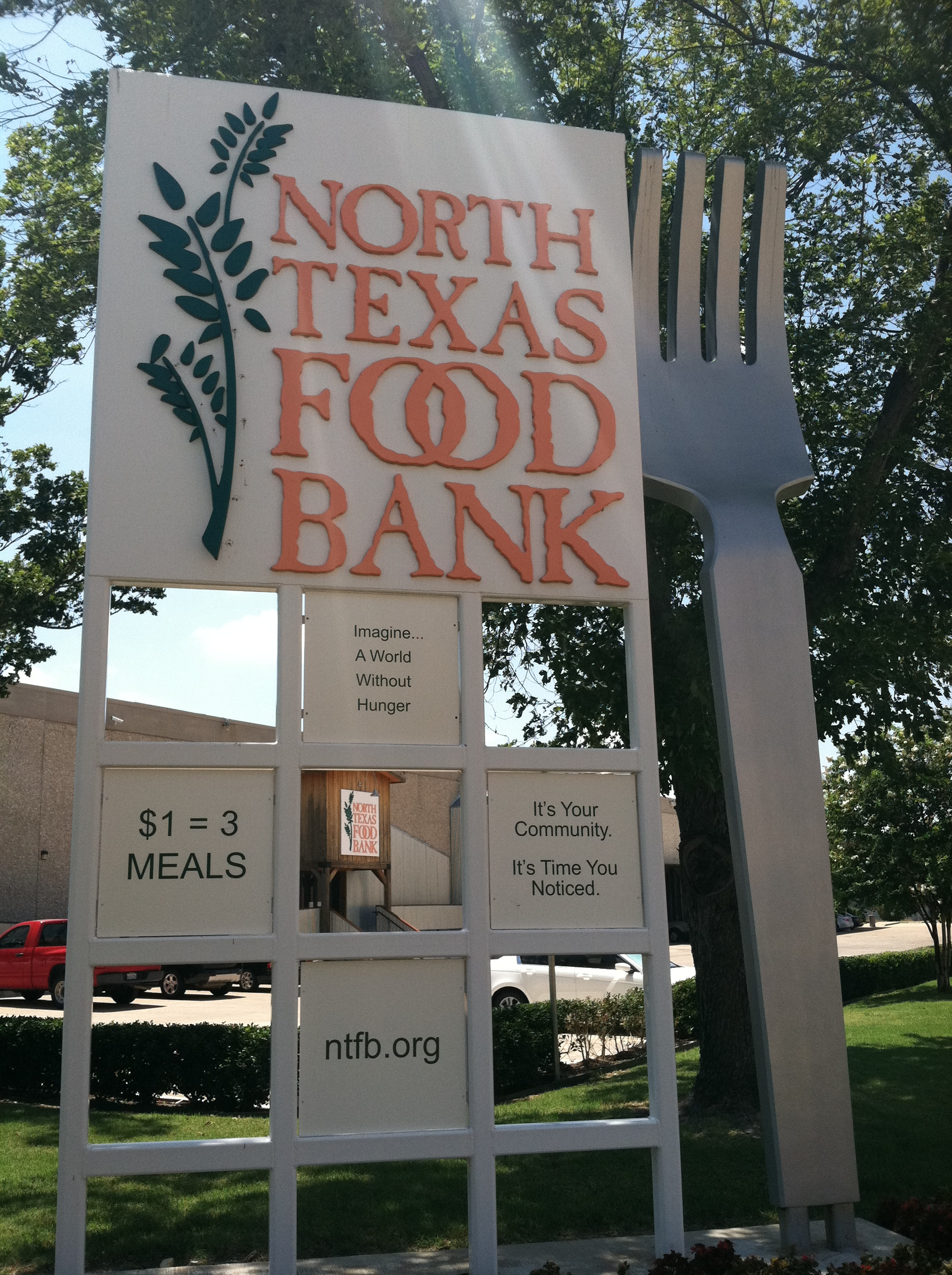
- Founded: 1982
- Founders: Liz Minyard, Kathryn Walt Hall, Jo Curtis and Lorraine Griffin Kircher.
- Type: Hunger Relief
- Purpose: A Hunger Free, Healthy North Texas
- Location: 3677 Mapleshade Lane, Plano, TX 75075
- Region served: North Texas
- Website: www.ntfb.org
- Member of Feeding America

The North Texas Food Bank (NTFB) is a social benefit organization located in Plano, Texas. The organization distributes donated, purchased and prepared foods through a network of nearly 1,000 feeding programs and 400 Partner Agencies in 13 North Texas counties.

== History ==
The North Texas Food Bank was established in 1982 by Liz Minyard (prior owner of the Minyard's Food Stores chain), Kathryn Hall, Jo Curtis and Lorraine Griffin Kircher. Their goal was to address the critical issue of hunger in North Texas by securing donations of surplus unmarketable, but wholesome, foods and grocery products for distribution through a network of charitable organizations in 13 North Texas counties: Dallas, Denton, Collin, Fannin, Rockwall, Hunt, Grayson, Kaufman, Ellis, Navarro, Lamar, Delta and Hopkins. In the first year of operation, the Food Bank distributed 400,000 pounds of food.

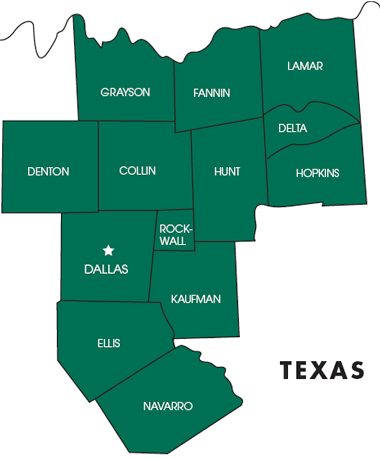
Thirteen counties serviced by the North Texas Food Bank

The North Texas Food Bank is a certified member of Feeding America, and based on distribution North Texas Food Bank is ranked 8th nationally among Feeding America food banks.

Since 1982, NTFB claims to have distributed more than half a billion pounds of food.

== Operations ==
The North Texas Food Bank allocates all donations by using only 6% of all resources for fundraising and administrative costs which allows 94 cents of every dollar donated to reach the hungry. Both donated and purchased product are stored in their main warehouse location in Plano, the Perot Family Campus, which they moved into in September 2018.

An estimated 31,000 individuals volunteer their time at NTFB each year.

== See also ==
- List of food banks
