= Houston Food Bank =

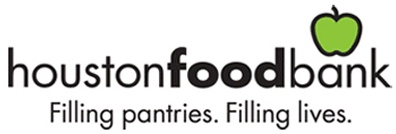
- Founded: 1982; 44 years ago
- Founder: Joan and Stanford Alexander
- Tax ID no.: 74-2181456
- Legal status: 501(c)(3) Non-profit organization
- Region served: Southeast Texas
- President, Chief Executive Officer: Brian Greene
- Website: www.houstonfoodbank.org

The Houston Food Bank (HFB) is a non-profit organization and the nation's largest food bank by distribution; providing access to 207 million nutritious meals in 18 counties in southeast Texas. The food bank's operations are made possible through a network of 1,800 community partners alongside their partner food banks in Montgomery County, Galveston and Brazos Valley. Headed by its current President and CEO, Brian Greene, the Houston Food Bank is a member organization of Feeding America, with a four-star rating from Charity Navigator. The Houston Food Bank, which bears the mission statement of Food for Better Lives, continues to be acknowledged for its community impact. Notable recognitions include Food bank of the Year in 2015, presented by Feeding America and the Pinnacle winner in 2012 and 2014, presented by the Better Business Bureau.

== Services ==
The Houston Food Bank's primary function is to provide extensive quantities of food to families and individuals who are experiencing hunger through relief organizations such as food pantries, soup kitchens and shelters. In addition, the Food Bank provides programs and services aimed at helping families achieve long-term stability including nutrition education, job training, health management, and help in securing state-funded assistance. The Houston Food Bank services roughly 800,000 families in an average year. Notably, since the COVID-19 pandemic reached the Houston area, the food bank's services expanded to offer mobile food distributions, drive thru pantries, food deliveries and drop offs, emergency food kits and virtual assistance to the community. Prior to the pandemic, approximately 1 in 5 children in Houston lived in food-insecure households; the latest estimates show that number now to be 1 in 4. The Houston Food Bank's daily distribution increased from 400,000 pounds of food in 2019, to 1 million pounds in 2020. Previously, the Houston Food Bank experienced an increase in food demands during the aftermath of Hurricane Harvey in August 2017. Following the natural disaster, the non-profit organization opened two additional warehouses with 240,00 square feet of space for onslaught donations, expanded the scope of its service area, and welcomed thousands of new volunteers. Most recently, the Houston Food Bank served as a voting site for the 2020 presidential election. In February 2021, president Joseph Biden visited the Houston Food Bank after a polar vortex hit southeast Texas, leaving many Houstonians seeking temporary food assistance.

== History ==
The Houston Food Bank first opened its doors on March 8, 1982, as a vision realized for compassionate individuals to provide hunger relief. It was founded by Bert Bandini. Their first home was a storefront in a north Houston shopping center donated by Joan and Stanford Alexander, who linked arms with founding forces based at Houston Metropolitan Ministries, now Interfaith Ministries for Greater Houston. By the end of 1984, the Houston Food Bank became a member of Second Harvest Network, now Feeding America. The Albert and Ethel Herzstein Foundation donated funding to purchase a 73,000 square foot warehouse in 1988 on US 59 at Cavalcade. In 2007, the Food Bank signed an agreement to purchase the Sysco Distribution Center at 535 Portwall Street, which now serves as the food bank's current headquarters. The large facility houses employee offices, an onsite conference center fitting upwards of 400 people, food separating stations and a food storage warehouse. As of 2025, the Houston Food Bank has been servicing the Houston community for 43 years.

== See also ==
- List of food banks
- Great Raise Houston
