= Interfaith Nutrition Network =

U.S. non-profit organization

The INN (Interfaith Nutrition Network)
- Formation: 1983
- Type: Non-profit
- Headquarters: 211 Fulton Avenue; Hempstead, New York
- Region served: Long Island, New York
- Members: 10 Soup Kitchens, 3 Emergency Shelters, 1 Long-Term Housing Program, 1 Resource Center & Clothing Boutique
- Main organ: Board of Directors
- Website: the-inn.org

The INN (Interfaith Nutrition Network) is a non-profit, volunteer organization based in Long Island, New York. The organization addresses hunger and homelessness including poverty on Long Island by providing food, shelter, long-term housing, and supportive services. It is estimated that the INN feeds about 5,000 Long Islanders each week.

== History ==
The INN was founded as a soup kitchen in Hempstead, New York, in 1983 by a group of volunteers headed by Patricia O'Connor and Michael Moran, then a chaplain at Hofstra University. Thirty people responded to their call for volunteers to create a soup kitchen; the effort was a success and news about the soup kitchen spread through word of mouth.

In 1984, the organization expanded to offer solutions for homelessness. The group opened an emergency shelter. The INN subsequently developed into a comprehensive organization with a variety of programs to aid the hungry and homeless on Long Island.

As of 2013, INN operations had grown to include 14 soup kitchens, three emergency shelters, and one long-term housing program. The INN is composed of people from many ethnic and faith communities and does not discriminate toward members of any religion, race, or ethnicity.

One of the initial volunteers, Jean Kelly, now serves as Executive Director of the organization. The group hosts an annual dinner, called the INNkeepers' Ball, to honour INN volunteers, raise awareness and raise funds for the organization. Over $1 million was raised at the 2013 event.

== Services ==
The INN offers five services:

- Soup Kitchens: The INN currently operates 10 soup kitchens in 14 locations across Long Island. Soup kitchens are available for those who need immediate food.
- Emergency Housing: The INN operates three emergency housing shelters. Two of these shelters provide housing for homeless families and one for men who are temporarily experiencing homelessness. The INN works with the Nassau County Department of Social Services to find appropriate housing and achieve the goal of permanent housing for those in need.
- Long-Term Housing: By working with families who are experiencing homelessness, The INN can provide families with homes and resources to reach goals of self-sufficiency and independence.
- Center for Transformative Change: In 2016, The INN opened the Center for Transformative Change directly adjacent to the Mary Brennan INN soup kitchen in Hempstead. The goal of the CTC is to serve as a Resource Center to assist guests of the soup kitchen to improve their life circumstances and/or become self-sufficient. The facility also houses a Clothing Boutique, where guests can acquire free clothing, including business attire for interviews or a new job, and housewares.
- Supportive Services: Along with providing food and shelter to those in need, The INN also supplies Long Islanders with counselling and case management, tenancy and home management, and educational tutoring for children and parents as well as vocational training.

== Partnerships ==
In 2010, Howitt Middle School in Farmingdale, New York, held a dance marathon fundraiser and was able to raise $10,167 which they donated to The INN. In 2011, Ice Girls from the New York Islanders hockey team supported a food drive in Mineola by volunteering their time to help collect food and greet passersby.

In 2013, Walmart donated $75,000 to The INN to aid Long Islanders during the holiday season.

== See also ==
- List of food banks
