= Northwest Harvest =

Food bank in Washington state, U.S.

- Formation: 1967
- Type: Non-profit
- Headquarters: Seattle, Washington
- Region served: Washington State
- Website: http://www.northwestharvest.org

Northwest Harvest is a non-profit organization supporting food banks in Washington state. Northwest Harvest distributes food to a network of more than 370 food banks, meal programs, and high-need schools throughout Washington State.

== History ==
In 1967 a group of Seattle community leaders formed The Ecumenical Metropolitan Ministry (EMM), an interfaith organization committed to identifying and addressing the primary problems of the poor and disadvantaged. Shortly after the formation of The EMM, Boeing's workforce dwindled from more than 100,000 employees to 32,500. By June 1971, unemployment in the Seattle area spiked from 2.9% to 13.1%.

Realizing that hunger was one of the most significant problems facing Seattle and beyond, The Ministry partnered with two other organizations to organize a food bank system, originally known as Neighbors in Need. In October 1970, they opened 34 food banks, originally conceived as "a short-term immediate response to the immediate crisis".

Even as the Seattle area recovered from its employment crisis, widespread need for food assistance remained. By early 1972, the network found itself serving 70,000 people per month. The Reagan administration's 1982 cuts to federal food stamp programs exacerbated this need, and led to further expansion of the food bank system.

In 1980, Northwest Harvest distributed just over 1 million pounds of food. By 2013 the amount of food distributed by Northwest Harvest increased to 32 million pounds.

== Source of Food ==
All of the food and operating funds received by Northwest Harvest comes from individuals, businesses, foundations, and other organizations. Approximately 25% of the food distributed by Northwest Harvest is purchased staples, such as rice, beans, pasta, canned fruit and vegetables, and protein. The other 75% comes from in-kind donations, mostly from businesses and institutions. The food received from food drives "provides… variety… [and] helps break the monotony of the staple food items".

== Distribution ==
Northwest Harvest operates their own distribution centers in Auburn, Spokane, and Yakima. These warehouses allow Northwest Harvest to handle large quantities of food, including perishable items such as fruits, vegetables, and meat. They also partner with distributors in Grays Harbor, Lewis County, Wahkiakum County, and the Emergency Food Network of Tacoma. These organizations often support one another with staff and transportation services to maximize their efficiency.

== Cherry Street Food Bank ==
Northwest Harvest's Cherry Street Food Bank in the First Hill Neighborhood of Seattle is one of the busiest in Washington, providing nearly 1.5 million meals annually.

== See also ==
- List of food banks
