= The 3000 Club =

Phoenix-based charity

Coordinates: 32.2170124°N 110.9615296°W

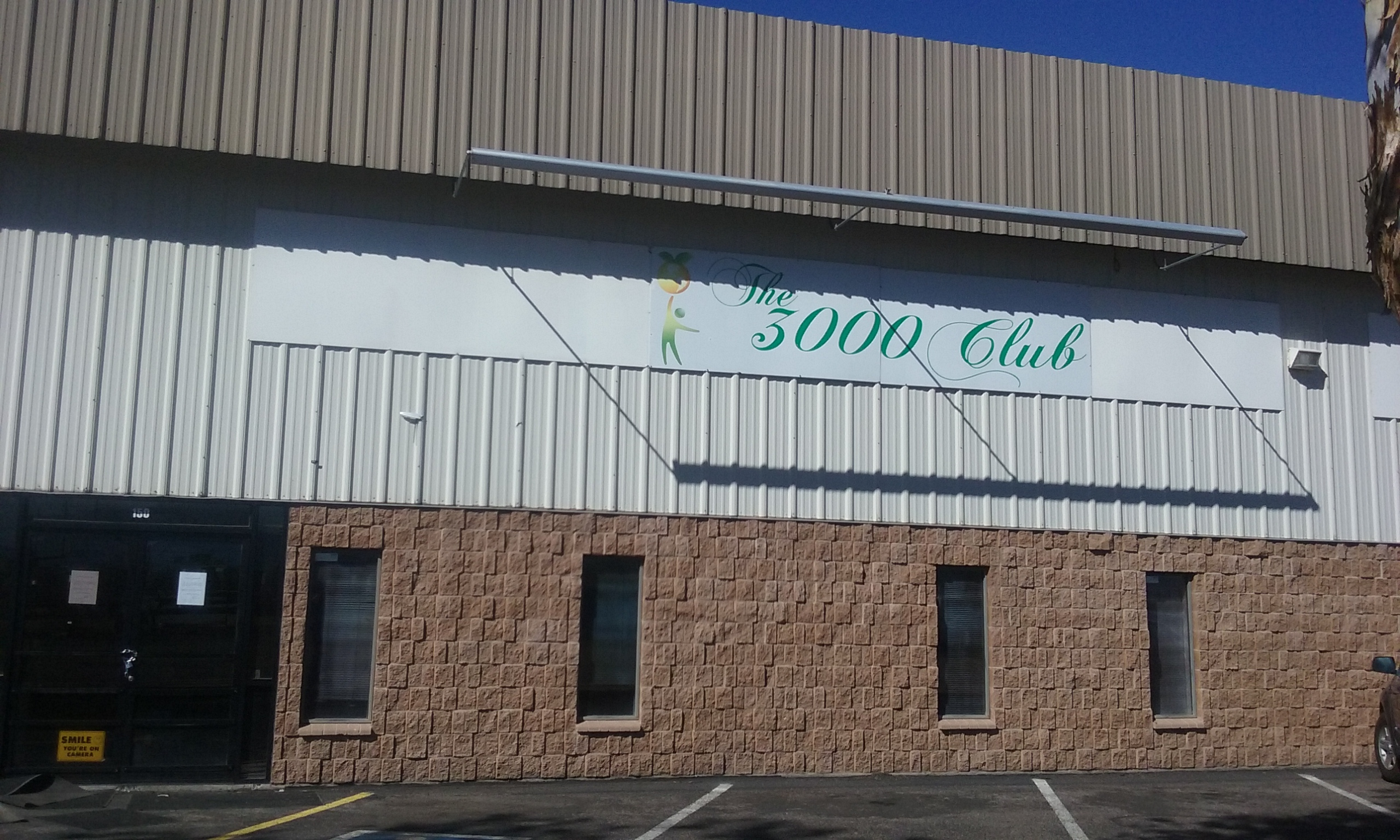
- Tucson warehouse of The 3000 Club
- Company type: Consumers' cooperative
- Founded: 2008
- Founders: Lon Taylor, Ethel Luzario
- Headquarters: Phoenix, Arizona, United States
- Key people: Nicco Punzalan (CEO)
- Products: Produce, local food, thrift
- Website: marketonthemove.org

The 3000 Club started as a Phoenix-based charity which works with food banks in Arizona in order to reduce food waste. The 3000 Club's main program is known as Market on the Move, although the organization provides other services for Arizona communities. Their previous mission statement "Providing life saving fresh fruits and vegetables to impoverished families" has been changed to "nothing useful should end up in a landfill."

Goals are aimed at improving the community, such as preventing 30,000,000 pounds of fresh fruits and vegetables from being wasted each year, refurbishing computers and electronics for educational use, redistributing useful medical supplies into 3rd world countries, working with same-minded organizations who believe there is too much waste.

== See also ==
- List of food banks
