= Community Services Block Grant =

Federal Community Action Agency funding

The Community Services Block Grant (CSBG) provides federal funding for Community Action Agencies (CAAs) and other programs that seek to address poverty at the community level. Like other block grants, CSBG funds are allocated to the states and other jurisdictions (including tribes, the District of Columbia, the Commonwealth of Puerto Rico, and territories) through a formula, with less federal oversight and fewer federal requirements than categorical grants. The CSBG formula determines each jurisdiction's funding level based on poverty population; once disbursed, most of the money is passed by the states and other jurisdictions to CAAs and other designated organizations to be spent on employment, education, income management, housing, nutrition, emergency services, and health.

== History ==
Congress authorized CSBG by the Omnibus Reconciliation Act of 1981, P.L. 97-35. President Reagan had requested the consolidation of 85 existing anti-poverty grants into seven categorical grants; Congress agreed to consolidate 77 grants into nine. The nine new block grants were budgeted about 25% less than the programs they replaced (Conlan, qtd. in). The CSBG legislation was amended in 1998 by the Coats Human Services Reauthorization Act of 1998, P.L. 105-285.

== Management ==
CSBG is administered by the Office of Community Services in the Administration for Children and Families of the Department of Health and Human Services

== Spending ==
In fiscal year 2007, the Federal Government, through the Department of Health and Human Services, spent $630 million. That amount was $654 million for fiscal year 2008.

In early 2011, for the FY 2012 United States Budget, President Obama proposed $350 million in reductions to the Community Service Block Grant Program, cutting its allocation in half.

== See also ==
- Community Development Block Grant
- Community Action Services and Food Bank

== Bibliography ==
- Conlan, Timothy J. 1981. "Back in Vogue: The Politics of Block Grant Legislation." Intergovernmental Perspective 7(3): 8-15.
- Brown, Lawrence David; Fossett, James W.; Palmer, Kenneth T., The Changing Politics of Federal Grants, Brookings Institution Press, 1984. Cf. p.57.
