= Gift of Bread =

Australian charitable organisation

- Formation: 14 April 2007
- Headquarters: Suite 2, Level 3A; 1 Bligh Street, Sydney
- Products: Bread
- Services: Food rescue
- Director: Marcel De Maria
- Director: Valerian Rego
- Secretary: Nick Tropea
- Parent organization: Medius Dei Limited
- Volunteers: 270 (2016)
- Website: www.giftofbread.org

Gift of Bread is an Australian food rescue charitable organisation with a simple mission: sharing bread. Committed to building strong, inclusive communities while also minimizing waste and promoting sustainability, Gift of Bread volunteers collect surplus bread from bakeries and supermarkets, and provide the bread free of charge to many frontline charities who are feeding vulnerable and socially-isolated people.

According to Australian food rescue pioneer OzHarvest, "Bread is the cheapest commodity, it's so easy to keep churning out. For bakeries, if they want to make their shelves look full they have to keep making it".

== History ==
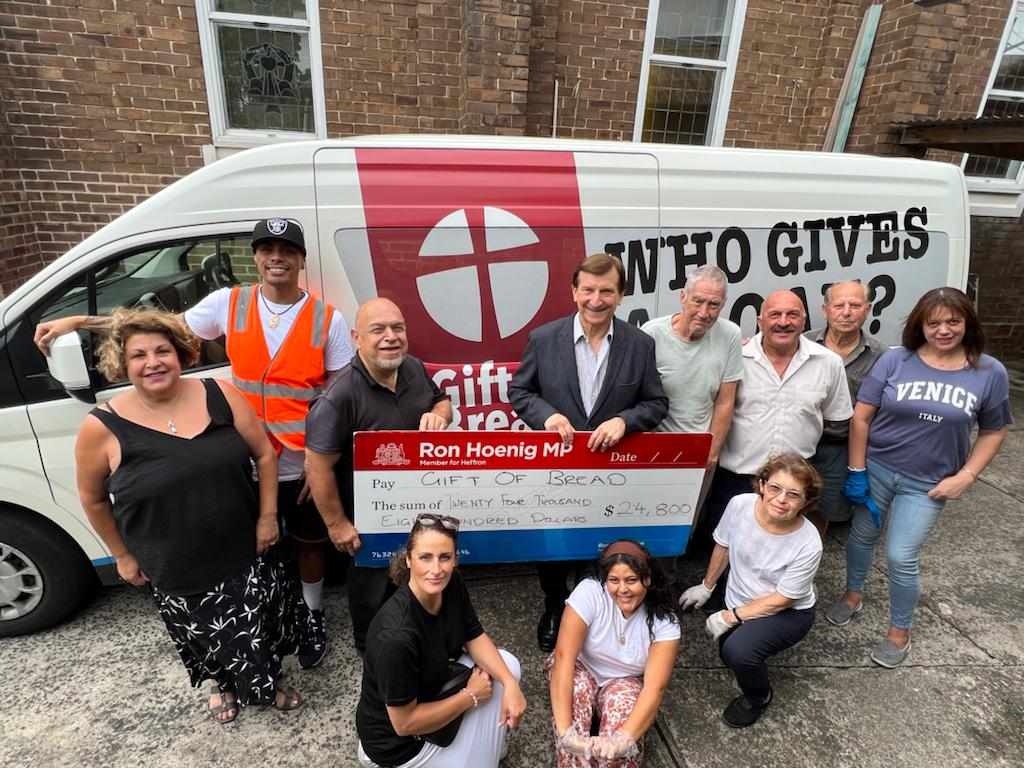
Ron Hoenig MP, member for Heffron, (standing 4th from left) presenting a cheque on behalf of the NSW Government to Marcel De Maria (standing 3rd from left) to purchase a new bread slicing machine

Gift of Bread began in 2007 when one person collected and distributed the leftover bread each Friday from a local Bakers Delight store. As more volunteers and bakeries joined the program, it grew significantly. By 2018, Gift of Bread was processing and delivering 290,000 bags of bread per year.

In 2016, in recognition of the importance of the project, Canterbury League Club donated a Toyota HiAce van to Gift of Bread. This meant there was less reliance on volunteer's vehicles, and bread could be collected and distributed more quickly and efficiently.

Community leader Dr George Peponis noted that "bread may seem like a simple item but it is a staple in many diets; every culture has some form of bread in their cuisine so not only is it nourishing, it is also unifying in the fact that everyone has a basic right to a standard of living adequate for their health and well-being".

In May 2017, The Daily Telegraph featured Gift of Bread in its coverage of National Volunteer Week. In August 2017, the Member for Summer Hill, Jo Haylen paid tribute to Gift of Bread in the New South Wales Legislative Assembly.

In May 2018, Gift of Bread obtained a second bread collection and delivery van, Spirit of Faith, following donations from the NSW Government, Inner West Council and Amato's Liquor Mart.

In 2020, Gift of Bread founder Marcel De Maria was awarded the title of Westfield Local Hero, which included a grant of $10 000 to Gift of Bread.

In October 2022, a third van (a Toyota HiAce SLWB named Spirit of Charity) was added to the fleet. In August 2023, the ageing Toyota H200 vans were replaced by a further two Toyota H300 SLWB vans.

== Business process ==
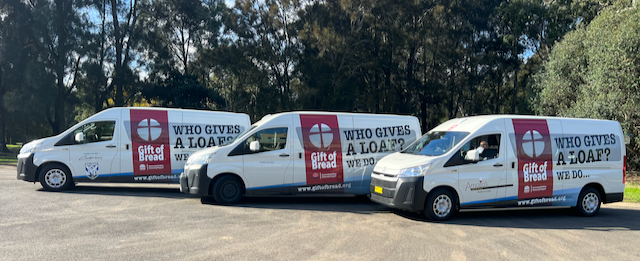
The Gift of Bread fleet as of September 2023

At the end of the day, volunteers collect surplus bread and bakery products from retail bakeries across the Inner West of Sydney. Products are then transported to a processing and distribution centre. The main centre is located in Tempe, New South Wales, with more than ten other distribution centres and minor hubs.

Bread loaves are sliced and packed, and rolls and bakery products are packaged uniformly. The resulting packages are provided free of charge to charitable organisations, boarding houses, nursing homes, community groups, schools, churches, outreach programs and individuals.

Major beneficiaries of Gift of Bread include the Exodus Foundation, Australian Red Cross, Society of Saint Vincent de Paul and Youth Off The Streets.

Operating costs are funded by donations, sausage sizzles and an annual dinner.

== See also ==
- List of food banks
