= Oregon Food Bank =

U.S. nonprofit organization

- Formation: 1988; 38 years ago
- Type: Non-profit organization
- Region served: Oregon
- Chief executive officer: Andrea Williams
- Website: www.oregonfoodbank.org

Oregon Food Bank is a hunger relief organization based in the U.S. state of Oregon.

== History ==
Oregon Food Bank began as Oregon Food Share (OFS) which was founded in 1982. OFS created the first statewide foodbank network in the United States in the early 1980s. Around the same time period, the US government established programs to distribute food and other commodities in order to deplete federal stockpiles and assist low-income Americans. Oregon Food Share was contracted by the state of Oregon to handle the state's share of the aid.

In 1988, OFS merged with Interagency Food Bank to become Oregon Food Bank.

== Network and operations ==
According to the organization's 2024 impact report, the "Oregon Food Bank Network brings together 21 regional food banks and more than 1,400 food assistance sites."

In its 2023 financial statements, the organization reported receiving significant food donations, resources, and financial support from individuals, businesses, and government programs.

== Advocacy and policy work ==
Oregon Food Bank conducts advocacy efforts, including supporting local, state, and federal legislation to improve food security and reduce poverty.

For example, Oregon Food Bank supports the "Food for All Oregonians" campaign, which advocated for state legislation to extend food assistance benefits to immigrants. This campaign aims to reduce food insecurity among immigrant and farmworker communities, who are disproportionately affected by hunger.

== See also ==
- List of food banks
