= Ag Against Hunger =

Non-profit food bank in California, U.S.

- Formation: 1990; 36 years ago
- Founders: Jess Brown, Willy Elliott-McCrae, Tim Driscoll
- Headquarters: Salinas, California
- Region served: Monterey, San Benito and Santa Cruz Counties, California
- Services: Fresh food collection and donation
- Website: Official website

Ag Against Hunger is a non-profit organization based in Salinas, California, established in 1990 that collects surplus produce from Monterey, San Benito and Santa Cruz County growers on the central coast of California. This fresh produce is then distributed to food banks throughout the west coast of the United States. The executive director of Ag Against Hunger is Lynn Figone.

== See also ==
- List of food banks
