= Midwest Food Bank =

U.S. charity

- Formation: 2003
- Founder: David Keiser
- Founded at: Bloomington, Illinois, U.S.
- Type: 501(c)(3)
- Registration no.: 41-2120170
- Headquarters: Normal, Illinois, U.S.
- CEO: Eric Hodel
- Revenue: $504 million (2023)
- Expenses: $498 million (2023)
- Volunteers: 36,000 (2023)
- Website: www.midwestfoodbank.org

Midwest Food Bank is an American 501(c)(3) non-profit organization that gathers food donations, primarily from large companies, and distributes them to other non-profit organizations and disaster sites. Founded on a family farm in Bloomington, Illinois, in 2003, Midwest Food Bank began expanding in 2005 after contributing to disaster relief efforts for Hurricane Katrina. Currently, it operates ten locations in the United States and two internationally. As of 2024, it was the United States' thirty-sixth-largest charity and the largest food bank by revenue; each month, it distributes more than $32 million worth of food to more than 2,000 other non-profit organizations.

== Mission and operations ==
Midwest Food Bank is a non-denominational, faith-based organization. It describes its mission as "to share the love of Christ by alleviating hunger and malnutrition locally and throughout the world." Its three core programs are local food distribution, disaster relief, and assistance to schoolchildren. Midwest places special emphasis on distributing fresh, nutritious food. It also distributes non-food items like cleaning supplies and personal hygiene products.

Midwest Food Bank receives most of its donations from large companies like Kellogg's that donate their overstock as it approaches its sell by date. It also salvages and, when it must, purchases food in bulk, acquiring between thirty and fifty-five dollars' worth of food for every dollar spent. (Note: This statistic varies between news sources: In September 2021, Bonita Springs Florida Weekly reported that Midwest "turn[s] a $1 donation into $34 of food." Gulfshore Business echoed this claim in March 2022. A September 2021 WTHR article reports Indiana executive director John Whitaker stating that $34 is the cost of a family food box.; In April 2022, Fox 59 quoted Whitaker saying: "Every dollar that comes into the Midwest Food Bank goes directly to feed people. We can turn that into $50 worth of food to go out and give to someone." Less than two weeks later, another Fox 59 article reported Whitaker saying the figure was $55.; In July 2022, The Pantagraph quoted Normal executive director Tara Ingham saying: "Every dollar we get can provide $30 worth of food." This figure was also reported by Fox 59 in June 2022.; Midwest Food Bank's own website uses the $30 figure.) Additionally, Midwest Food Bank produces its own meal packages, called Tender Mercies, consisting of fortified rice, beans, and protein that can either be prepared by simply adding water or serve as a base for more complex recipes; Midwest characterizes the packages, which cost twenty cents each to produce, as both cheap and nutritious, and they form a key part of its international efforts.

Midwest does not distribute to individuals. Instead, other non-profit organizations send representatives to select the products they want from the available options and pick them up once or twice a month. It provides food to more than 2,000 non-profit organizations, including other food banks, homeless shelters, and churches, at no cost to them. At schools, it distributes "Hope Packs", which consist of shelf-stable foods that children can prepare without assistance, to provide children who qualify for free lunches with food to eat over the weekend; the cost of providing these packages to one child for a year is fifty dollars. For disaster relief, Midwest coordinates with The Salvation Army, providing supplies while The Salvation Army distributes them. It is capable of delivering supplies to disaster sites within twenty-four hours of impact.

Ninety-nine percent of its money goes directly toward its programs. To accomplish this, Midwest relies on more than 25,000 volunteers to sort and pack donations and operate its trucks and forklifts. Its largest expense is the fuel needed to operate its fleet of semi-trucks, which it uses to pick supplies up from donors and ship them across the country to where they are needed. From 2011 to 2022, Midwest Food Bank was given a four-star rating by Charity Navigator for its financial responsibility, making it one of the three percent of charities to receive that rating for ten consecutive years. In 2022, it received a perfect score from Charity Navigator and a platinum seal from GuideStar for its transparency and accountability.

As of 2024, Midwest was the United States' thirty-sixth-largest charity and the largest food bank by revenue. Each month, it distributes more than $32 million worth of food.

== History ==
In 2003, Midwest Food Bank was founded by David Keiser and his family on their Bloomington, Illinois family farm after turning a barn into a distribution center for local food banks. Unlike most food banks, which keep their operations focused locally, Midwest has since expanded to ten locations across the United States, one in Haiti and another in Kenya.

Midwest Food Bank began participating in disaster relief during Hurricane Katrina, to which it contributed approximately 150 semi-trucks of supplies. It has since contributed to disaster relief operations for other natural disasters, including Hurricanes Harvey, Michael, Laura, Henri, and Ida; the 2021 Texas power crisis; the 2021 Haitian earthquake; and the 2022 Kentucky floods. In March 2022, in response to the Russian invasion of Ukraine, Midwest partnered with Convoy of Hope to send 240,000 Tender Mercies packets to refugees in Romania.

Midwest Food Bank saw an increase in the demand for food during the COVID-19 pandemic. Simultaneously, food shortages caused a reduction in donations of surplus, forcing Midwest to buy products that were normally donated at higher prices than usual, which triggered a financial crisis. To continue operating safely, Midwest reduced its staff to a small core of regular volunteers and began selecting and loading food into partner agencies' representatives' vehicles instead of allowing them to enter its warehouses and choose products themselves. To ease distribution, it began packaging family food boxes, which contain enough shelf-stable food to feed a family of four persons for four or five days.

Midwest Food Bank's operations were also impacted by the 2021–2022 inflation surge. Inventory and logistics director Michael Hoffman reported that increases in the price of diesel fuel, estimated by executive director Marcie Luhigo to cost an additional five hundred dollars per tank per semi-truck, caused it to expend its annual fuel budget within the first five months; chief resource officer Jada Hoerr reported the price of contracting truckers also increased two- to threefold. Additionally, higher food prices led to the demand reported by Midwest's partner agencies increasing by as much as 28 percent in some areas.

== See also ==
- List of food banks
