= Forgotten Harvest =

Non-profit organization in Michigan, US

- Formation: 1990
- Type: Non-profit
- Headquarters: Oak Park, Michigan
- Region served: Metro Detroit
- CEO: Adrian Lewis
- Main organ: Board of Directors
- Affiliations: Feeding America
- Budget: $77,220,713
- Staff: 71
- Volunteers: 14,700
- Website: http://www.forgottenharvest.org

Forgotten Harvest is a non-profit food rescue organization that collects food that would otherwise go to waste and delivers it free of charge to organizations feeding the hungry in Metro Detroit. In 2015, the nonprofit distributed more than 40 million pounds of food to more than 260 emergency food providers.

Forgotten Harvest is a member of Feeding America, the United States' umbrella organization for food banks and food rescue agencies.

== Founder and history ==
Forgotten Harvest was founded in 1990 by Nancy Fishman. Susan Goodell became the organization's CEO in 2000, and under her leadership the amount of food delivered increased significantly:

- 2001: 1.1 million pounds
- 2007: 8.6 million pounds
- 2011: 23 million pounds
- 2013: 43.9 million pounds
- 2014: 48.8 million pounds

Forgotten Harvest was the first food rescue organization in the United States to form a rescue partnership with a grocery store, launching a program with Kroger in 1994.

== Operations ==
Forgotten Harvest operates a fleet of 33 refrigerated trucks that pick up surplus or unwanted food at health department-approved sources such as grocery stores, restaurants, stadiums, banquet facilities and other venues. It also works with local farmers to mobilize volunteers to harvest unwanted crops in their fields.

Some major retailers and venues from which Forgotten Harvest collects food in Metro Detroit include Kroger, Costco, Meijer and Walmart stores, Comerica Park and The Henry Ford.

Volunteers sort and repackage food at Forgotten Harvest's distribution center and trucks deliver the food free of charge to area nonprofit agencies that provide emergency food assistance in Metro Detroit.

== Forgotten Harvest Canada ==
In 2011, Forgotten Harvest created Forgotten Harvest Canada , a Windsor, Ontario-based food rescue agency based on Forgotten Harvest's model. In its first fiscal year it delivered 135,000 pounds of food and in 2013, the organization announced that it had reached a milestone of delivering one million pounds of food since its founding.

== Forgotten Harvest Farms ==
In the spring of 2013, Forgotten Harvest launched a farming initiative, "Forgotten Harvest Farms," where it began growing its own food on donated farmland. In October 2013, they announced an estimated 850,000 pound harvest in their first year, and the donation of $400,000 in farm equipment from Ram Truck, Case IH and New Holland Agriculture to support future growth in farm operations.

Over the course of its first three years of operations, Forgotten Harvest Farms reported harvesting more than 3.1 million pounds of produce.

== Awards and recognition ==
- In 2007, Forgotten Harvest was named the "Best-Managed Nonprofit in Metro Detroit" by Crain's Detroit Business.
- In 2011, its President & CEO Susan Goodell received the Eleanor Josaitis Unsung Hero Award in the Shining Light Regional Cooperation Awards presented by the Detroit Free Press
- In 2012, Forgotten Harvest and ConAgra Foods shared a gold Edison Award for Green Programs for their "novel partnership between a food manufacturing plant and a food rescue resource to redirect perfectly good & edible, but historically discarded food from a landfill to feeding hungry people."
- In 2014, Forgotten Harvest received a Governor's Service Award from Michigan Governor Rick Snyder for "Outstanding Volunteer Program."

== See also ==
- List of food banks
