= Arkansas Foodbank =

U.S. non-profit food bank

The Arkansas Foodbank is a non-profit food bank located in Little Rock, Arkansas. The Arkansas Foodbank distributed more than 20.9 million pounds of food and grocery products to its member agencies for Arkansans in need in 2013, according to chief executive officer, Rhonda Sanders.

Established in 1984, the Arkansas Foodbank is a cornerstone of hunger relief. Through local and national partnerships, the Foodbank acquires and distributes large quantities of food and other resources to hungry people. Food and other grocery products are distributed to food pantries, soup kitchens, shelters, and schools throughout its entire 33-county service area in central and south Arkansas. The Foodbank's central location is a 73,000 sq ft (6,800 m^{2}) warehouse in Little Rock, called the Donald W. Reynolds Distribution Center. They also operate two other branches in Caddo Valley and Warren, Arkansas.

More than 270,000 people within the Arkansas Foodbank's 33-county service area do not have a steady source of food; nearly 90,000 of them are children. Last year, the Foodbank distributed 17.4 million meals to their 300 member agencies to help feed the hungry.

The Arkansas Foodbank is a member of Feeding America, a nationwide network of 200 food banks that leads the fight against hunger in the United States. They are also a founding member of the Arkansas Hunger Relief Alliance. The group is made up of the six Feeding America food banks in Arkansas with the goal to create a coordinated effort to reduce hunger in the state.

== Overview ==
The Foodbank provides hunger-relief services to 300 member agencies. Many of them our either food pantries, soup kitchens or shelters. The Foodbank also provides assistance through the following programs:

- Kid's Cafe/Summer Feeding — More than 2,300 children at 23 sites received after-school snacks in 2013. Thanks to a partnership with Midwest Dairy Council, children at five after-school sites received hot meals three days a week, in addition to the snack. In 2014, the Foodbank provided breakfast and lunches to children at four summer feeding sites. Summer Feeding provides crucial nutrition during the time school is not in session.
- Senior Services — Arkansas has the highest percentage of seniors, more than one in four at 25.4%, facing the threat of hunger among states in the U.S. The Arkansas Foodbank began testing senior service strategies, including a list of senior-friendly food items, at their member agencies. 14 senior service pilot sites were selected across 12 counties in the Foodbank's service area. The pilot sites are focusing on outreach, pantry experience, accessibility/delivery, senior-friendly foods, and SNAP Outreach.
- Community Outreach — The Foodbank's 300 members are the local partners, and together they distribute food to people who are hungry in central and south Arkansas. Community Outreach is designed to increase the capacity of the Foodbank's local partners and to nurture new partners in under served areas.
- College Pantries — seeks to help college students who are food insecure, especially nontraditional students. The first college pantry started at Pulaski Technical College in August 2013.
- School Pantries — delivered to children and their families who would otherwise not have food for the weekend.

== New building ==
In 2010, as a result of a $10.3 million grant from the Donald W. Reynolds Foundation, the Arkansas Foodbank began constructing a new warehouse and distribution facility. On March 28, 2011, operations began at the new Arkansas Foodbank Donald W. Reynolds Distribution Center. Key advantages of the new facility is that it more than doubles the Foodbank's storage capacity for dry, refrigerated, and frozen products, it will serve to accelerate food sourcing and distribution, give the Foodbank the ability to handle diverse products for better diets for the hungry people of Arkansas, and lastly, improves the usable facilities for volunteers, especially groups of volunteers seeking worthwhile community service projects.

== Counties served ==
The Foodbank serves 33 counties in Arkansas:

- Arkansas
- Ashley
- Bradley
- Calhoun
- Chicot
- Clark
- Cleburne
- Cleveland
- Columbia
- Conway
- Dallas
- Desha
- Drew
- Faulkner
- Garland
- Grant
- Hot Spring
- Independence
- Jefferson
- Lee
- Lincoln
- Lonoke
- Monroe
- Montgomery
- Ouachita
- Perry
- Phillips
- Pope
- Pulaski
- Prairie
- Saline
- Union
- Van Buren
- White

== See also ==
- List of food banks
