= FareShare (Australia) =

Australian not-for-profit organisation

- Formation: 2000
- Headquarters: 1–7 South Audley St, Abbotsford
- Location: Abbotsford, Victoria, Australia
- Chief Executive Officer: Marcus Godinho
- Key people: David Harris (President), Sandy Dudakov (Vice-President), Marcus Godinho, Kellie Watson, Lucy Farmer, Fiona Maxwell, Brian Scammell, Crickette DerJeu, Patrick Lanyon, Rosemary Kelly, James Fien
- Staff: 35
- Website: www.fareshare.net.au

FareShare is an Australian not-for-profit food rescue organisation that operates Australia's largest charity kitchens located in Melbourne and Brisbane. Its mission is to mobilise volunteers to cook delicious, free meals from rescued, donated and homegrown ingredients to improve the lives of Australians in hardship.

FareShare's healthy, balanced and ready-to-eat meals are provided free to frontline food relief charities to boost the health and wellbeing of people unable to access or afford meals or who may lack the facilities or capability to cook for themselves.

In Melbourne, with the help of hundreds of regular volunteers guided by experienced chefs, FareShare cooks thousands of meals every day for charities such as soup vans, homeless shelters, women’s refuges and community food banks. Thousands of corporate (team) volunteers and secondary school students contribute to this mission every year.

FareShare also grows its own vegetables at three kitchen gardens to boost the nutrition content and diversity of its meals. The largest of these is operated on a family farm where FareShare has approximately two acres of beds under cultivation.

FareShare’s production kitchen in Brisbane was established in 2018 harnessing food provided by Foodbank Queensland to cook meals for Queenslanders experiencing hardship and crisis.

FareShare is a charity and relies on the support of philanthropic foundations, businesses and individual donors to rescue food and cook meals.

== History ==
How FareShare Started. In 2000, a pastry chef called Guido Pozzebon "'One Umbrella'started cooking 300 pies every Saturday morning for the Salvation Army and St Vincent de Paul. Guido and a group of friends would meet at the RACV Club and use surplus food accumulated over the week to cook savoury pastries.

Steven Kolt, a Jewish Aid Australia member, knew of the work of City Harvest, an organisation that rescues food for the needy of New York City. As a result, Melbourne City Harvest began in 2001, rescuing food that would otherwise be wasted. Prepared meals were collected from function halls and catering venues.

In late 2001, Melbourne City Harvest and One Umbrella decided to merge.

One Umbrella then lobbied for the creation of Victoria's "Good Samaritan Act" which provides legal protection to those who act in good faith by donating food to charities.

In 2008, One Umbrella changed its name to FareShare and, for the first time, opened its own kitchen in Abbotsford, Victoria.

== See also ==
- List of food banks
