= Lagos Food Bank =

Food bank in Nigeria

The Lagos Food Bank Initiative (LFBI) was registered in 2015 and began operations in February 2016. As the first food bank in Nigeria, LFBI is dedicated to tackling hunger and malnutrition, reducing food waste, and providing emergency food solutions through its network of food banks nationwide.

LFBI is a front-line agency that assist individuals struggling with malnutrition and hunger, championing sustainable food security, nutrition, and empowerment, transforming communities and fostering equitable access to food resources throughout Nigeria. LFBI works with religious organizations, corporate entities, and individuals to achieve their main objectives.

LFBI's main target audience are: the most vulnerable in society, children from ages 0–16, pregnant women and lactating mothers, widows, seniors from ages 50 years and above, patients with diet-related diseases, the destitute, extremely indigent families and unemployed youths.

== Contributions ==
The Lagos Food Bank Initiative has carried out nutrition-based programs in slum communities across Lagos State though numerous donations and partnerships from both individual and corporate donors.

In September 2020 the NGO partnered with Candlelight Foundation to feed the less privileged and end hunger during the COVID-19 lockdown and distributed over 55,000 meals in Lagos state.

== See also ==
- List of food banks
