= Food Lifeline =

Non-profit organization in Washington, US

- Formation: 1979
- Type: Non-profit
- Headquarters: Seattle, Washington
- Region served: Western Washington
- CEO: Linda Nageotte
- Website: foodlifeline.org

Food Lifeline is a non-profit organization that supplies food to different food banks across Western Washington. Food Lifeline is responsible for repackaging and delivering food to 275 different organizations that distribute meals to the Western Washington population. Out of all the food distributed to these different organizations, 30% of the meals end up coming directly from Food Lifeline alone. Food Lifeline is part of a nationwide non-profit called Feeding America and assists in collecting food that would otherwise go to waste.

In 1979 Food Lifeline was founded and it is now managed and operated by a board of directors. Approximately forty percent of food in America goes to waste due to the inability to handle and move food from place to place before it perishes. Food Lifeline operates to stop this food, especially perishables such as vegetables and fruits, from going into landfills.

== Location and distribution ==
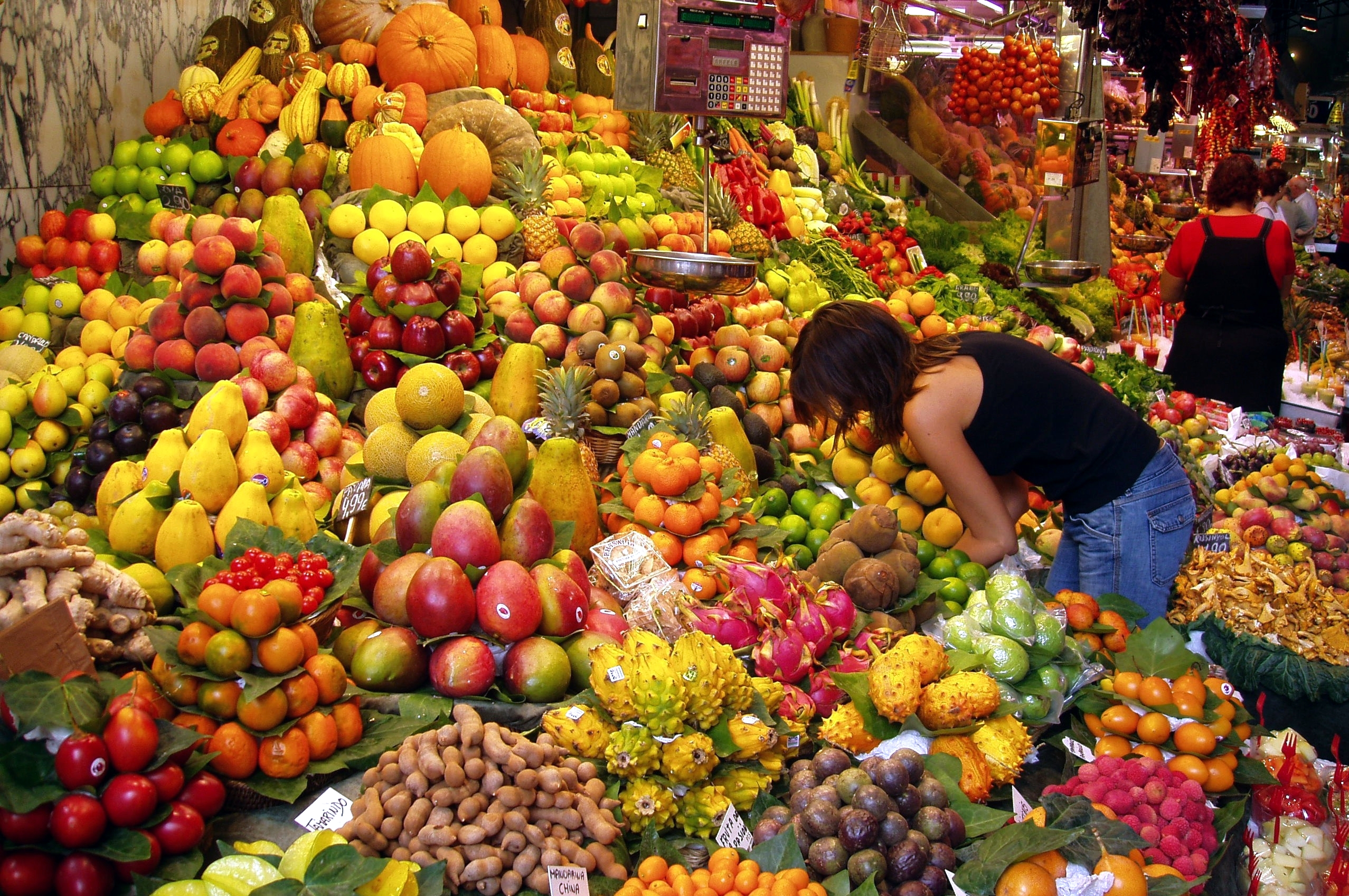
Several culinary fruits. Fruits and other perishable items that are discarded by grocery stores are reclaimed by Food Lifeline to feed Western Washington.

Mass quantities, nearly 21 million pounds, of food are brought to, repackaged at, and distributed from Food Lifeline's two warehouses. One warehouse is located in Shoreline, Washington, and the second location is at SoDo, Washington. This food comes from restaurants, grocery stores, farmers, and food manufacturers. Every day Food Lifeline is able to distribute 88,000 meals with the help from over 10,000 volunteers.

Currently, Food Lifeline is working towards creating one main work station, to be called the Hunger Solution Center, in Seattle, Washington. With 190,000 square feet of space, this new headquarters will help Food Lifeline save even more food. Food Lifeline estimates that it can distribute up to 100 million pounds of food every year from this new workplace compared to its previous 30 million pounds.

== Fundraisers ==
Food Lifeline interacts with various companies and individuals to raise money through team fundraising events. The organization has had an annual fundraiser for the past four years. In the 2015 effort, Food Lifeline raised $210,000, which funded one million meals. Food Lifeline, with the help of local chefs, auctioned off different culinary lessons, kitchen appliances, and dinner reservations at restaurants.

Food Lifeline has partnered with the NFL Seattle Seahawks and Chef John Howie in the Kick Hunger Challenge – Taste of the NFL. Across the US, the NFL teams raise money throughout the football season to combat hunger; Food Lifeline has won this challenge over the past three years and is working towards a fourth victory. In 2014 the fundraiser raised $83,000 for Food Lifeline.

== Food Lifeline programs ==
To combat hunger, Food Lifeline created various programs to ensure good food isn't wasted. These programs include Kids Cafe, Grocery Rescue, Seattle's Table, Mobile Food Pantry, and Target Meals for Minds.

=== Kids Cafe ===
Kids Cafe is a program that Food Lifeline, partnering with Volunteers of America, created to combat summertime hunger for kids who do not have ready access to healthy meals. During the school year approximately 485,000 children in Western Washington are on free or reduced lunch but during the summer months many of these kids go hungry. That is where Food Lifeline steps in and is now providing nutritious bag lunches through Kids Cafe. Congresswoman Suzan DelBene visited a Kids Cafe located in Sultan, Washington, mentioning that Food Lifeline has her full support in reducing hunger in Western Washington.

=== Grocery Rescue ===
The goal of Grocery Rescue is to partner with grocery retail stores, such as QFC and Fred Meyer to save food that would otherwise end up in landfill. Food that is considered unsellable could include items approaching their sell-by dates or produce that does not have the optimal quality look.

=== Seattle's Table ===
Beginning in 1989, Seattle's Table collects prepared food from neighboring restaurants, schools, hotels, and corporate cafeterias that would otherwise be sent to the landfill and disperses the food to 50 different meal plans throughout all of King County that then create hot meals for those in need.

=== Mobile Food Pantry ===
Started in the summer of 2013 as an effort to help disperse more fresh food to areas in need throughout Western Washington. Though Food Lifeline feeds nearly 1 million people annually, there are still some that are not reached due to geographical barriers and little access. The Mobile Food Pantry aids in reaching these people. It delivers fresh food to the King County area, as well as Cowlitz and Whatcom counties, with plans to expand to neighboring counties.

=== Target Meals for Minds ===
Target Meals for Minds provides meals to families of children that qualify for free or reduced lunches. Families can fill up grocery bags with fruits, veggies, meats, starches, and kid friendly foods right at school.

== See also ==
- List of food banks
