= Meet Each Need with Dignity =

American nonprofit organization

Meet Each Need with Dignity (MEND)
- Founded: 1971
- Type: Non-profit organization
- Registration no.: 23-7306337
- Location: Pacoima, California
- Key people: Janet Marianccio, CEO
- Website: mendpoverty.org

Meet Each Need with Dignity (MEND) is a 501(c)(3) nonprofit organization serving the northeast San Fernando Valley in Los Angeles, California.

Started in a San Fernando Valley garage in 1971, MEND is an institution as the largest food bank, a clothing center and homeless people's care service center in the Valley which supports and cares them through case management services.

With fewer than 30 full-time employees, it relies heavily on volunteers to help deliver services to the community. According to the organization, this has resulted to limited expenses for administration and fund-raising (generally less than 6% of annual revenues). In 2016, MEND delivered more than $13 million of aid in the form of food, clothing, and services.

== History ==
MEND was founded in 1971 by a group of volunteers led by Ed and Carolyn Rose. Working out of three garages, the volunteers collected food, clothing, and furniture for needy families in the area. It was incorporated as a nonprofit 501(c)(3) organization in 1976.

In 1982, its operations were consolidated into a small warehouse in Pacoima, Los Angeles, which the organization then purchased in 1985.

The 1990s witnessed an expansion of its services, beginning with a free medical and dental clinic, opened in 1991 (a vision clinic was added in 2001.) In 1992, it introduced a computer lab to offer English language learning and job training.

MEND's original facility was severely damaged by the Northridge earthquake in January 1994 and was reconstructed within six months. Two years later, its capacity was doubled to 20,000 square feet. In 2003, to accommodate further growth, the organization purchased land near its original facility and opened a 40,000-square-foot building there in 2007. MEND's foodbank, clothing center and health clinics are housed in this building while the original building remains in use as the organization's Education and Training Center (ETC). Programs in the ETC building include MEND's computer and English as a Second Language (ESL) classes.

In March 2009, as a cost-cutting measure in response to the 2008 financial crisis, the organization reduced its operating expenses by closing its doors on Mondays.

In 2012, MEND was awarded the California Governor's Volunteering and Service Award for Nonprofit of the Year. MEND was recognized for its "extraordinary ability to leverage volunteers in service to their organization".

In 2018 MEND expanded their programming to include a case management service called the Family Support Program, which works with entire families to disrupt cycles of generational poverty.

2019 saw the addition of a farmer's market-style service, titled the Buen Provecho Farmers' Market, which brought fresh produce to MEND clients at no cost. The same year, MEND introduced the Pathways to Wellness Program, which also utilized a case management approach to helping people achieve greater health outcomes through nutrition and exercise. The Little Health Market was also opened, which was a "store" that made healthy alternatives available to participants.

== Programs ==
Emergency Food Bank
MEND operates what it describes as the second-largest emergency food bank in Los Angeles. Food is distributed directly from its headquarters and satellite locations; some is distributed to other local pantries and charities. MEND operates what is traditionally known as a food bank, where it also distributes food to other smaller food pantries across Los Angeles. It also operates as a food pantry, where it distributes food directly to individuals from its operating site.
Clothing Center
The Clothing Center meets the needs of severely low-income families and individuals experiencing homelessness, by providing them with essentials such as clothing, shoes, diapers and toiletries. Additionally, over the holidays MEND provides blankets, jackets and socks to our poorest clients. All distributed clothing is donated to MEND by individuals and retailers allowing us to provide clothes for every occasion, including business attire, clothing for growing children, and something warm for those who are homeless.
Homeless Care Services
Since 2008, the organization has offered homeless clients the use of shower facilities in its headquarters and access to toiletries, hot meals, clean clothing, and food bags from the food bank weekly. The program supports an average of 2,000 unduplicated homeless men and women a year.
Family Support Program
In the Fall of 2018, MEND started its first case management program – the Family Support Program (FSP). The program focuses on intensive 1:1 social work support, guidance and resource connections for families in poverty. The goal for every participant is to reduce their dependence on MEND's and other safety net services and gain greater stability and independence.
Pathways to Wellness
The Pathways to Wellness program incorporates a collaboration with the Foodbank and Family Support Program. Utilizing a case management approach, it helps individuals who are struggling with chronic health conditions learn and incorporate behaviors that help them achieve better food security, and empowers them to develop lasting healthy lifestyle habits, sustained health, resilience and wellbeing.
Annual Christmas Basket Program
Every December, approximately 1200 families are visited by MEND volunteers in their homes. Those in most need are recommended for informal "adoption" by donors and community groups; others can visit MEND headquarters to receive gifts and boxes of food for Christmas dinner. The relationship between adopters and their adoptive families often continues beyond the holidays.

== COVID-19 pandemic ==
In 2020, MEND, as many other nonprofits serving vulnerable communities, had to figure out a way to continue essential services while also keeping the community, staff and volunteers safe. Emergency food bank services continued and MEND experienced many more people coming to receive food services than before the pandemic. Pacoima, where MEND is located, was hit particularly hard by the pandemic, as it had some of the highest infection rates in Los Angeles County. A New York Times article highlighted the high rates of infection in Pacoima: "County data shows that Pacoima, a predominantly Latino neighborhood that has one of the highest case rates in the nation, has roughly five times the rate of Covid-19 cases as much richer and whiter Santa Monica".

MEND launched its Hope & Care Program during the pandemic as a way to bring education, awareness and resources regarding COVID safety to Pacoima and surrounding neighborhoods. Outreach teams go out into the community and provide PPE such as masks and sanitizer, along with education on ways of transmission. They are also delivering food and other essentials for people undergoing quarantine due to a positive COVID test.

== Recognition ==
MEND has been given a four-star rating by Charity Navigator, a group that rates charities with revenues of $1 million annually as to how well they carry out their stated mission. MEND is listed with Charity Navigator and can be found using their search page. It has earned a GuideStar Exchange Seal for its "commitment to transparency."

In the book Forces for Good: The Six Practices of High-Impact Nonprofits (2012), the organization was profiled for its use of shared leadership.

MEND was honored with the 2012 Governor's Volunteering and Service Award as California's Nonprofit of the Year. MEND was chosen by the office of the Governor and California Volunteers in recognition of its "service and innovation while addressing the increasing needs of the state of California."

== See also ==
- List of food banks
