= ICare Foodbank =

Food bank in Nigeria

iCare Foodbank is a food bank in Nigeria that was established on October 16, 2016, by Babajimi Benson of Ikorodu Constituency through his iCare Foundation. It is the first food bank in Nigeria. iCare Foodbank distributes food ingredients monthly to a minimum of three hundred families including elderly people, widows, indigent people and the vulnerable in the society.

== See also ==
- List of food banks
