= Food Bank (Bogotá) =

The Banco Arquidiócesano de Alimentos (English: Archdiocesan Food Bank) is supported by private enterprise and the Archdiocese of Bogotá, and which works to promote welfare to the underprivileged population in Colombia's capital city and surrounding areas.

The concept of the Bank is to acquire perishable and nonperishable food from large food brands, while keeping manufacturing companies from converting the food into animal food or letting it go to waste. The Bank employs appropriate procedures to provide items equally and justly to the needy.

The Bank has delivered more than 70,000,000 kg (150,000,000 lb) and 115 billion Colombian pesos in goods.

== See also ==
- List of food banks
