= Food Banks Canada =

Canadian charitable organization

- Founded: 1987; 39 years ago
- Location: Mississauga, Ontario
- CEO: Christopher Hatch
- Revenue: $36,171,087 (2017)
- Website: foodbankscanada.ca
- Formerly called: Canadian Association of Food Banks

Food Banks Canada (formerly the Canadian Association of Food Banks) is a charitable organization representing the food bank community across Canada. Founded in 1987, Food Banks Canada's network comprises 10 Provincial Associations and over 500 local food banks. The organization's mission is to "enable an effective food bank community that addresses the short term need for food and longer term solutions to reduce hunger in Canada". It operates many programs such as Hunger Awareness Week, HungerCount, a research report on food bank use in Canada, and a Safe Food Handling program for food banks.

In 2008, the Canadian Association of Food Banks changed its name to "Food Banks Canada".

== History ==
The first food bank in Canada opened its doors in 1981 in the city of Edmonton, Alberta. In 1987, the Canadian food bank community created the Canadian Association of Food Banks to represent food banks nationally.

There are now over 700 food banks and 3,000 food programs available in Canada.

In 2008, HungerCount reported that on average, 704,414 individuals used a food bank per month. Other HungerCount 2008 numbers include:

- 37% of those assisted are children under the age of 18
- 50% of assisted households have at least one child
- For 20% of assisted households, the primary source of income is current or recent employment
- Approximately 13% are receiving provincial disability income support
- 50% are receiving social assistance
- In March 2008, food banks served 3,091,777 meals in 4324234
- In March 2008, volunteers gave 440,000 hours of their time to assist food banks

== Activities ==
Some of Food Banks Canada's activities include food distribution through the National Food Sharing System, the annual HungerCount research report on national and provincial food bank use in Canada, and Hunger Awareness Week to promote the work of food banks and the individuals using their services.

=== Murray the Brave ===
In May 2020 during the COVID-19 pandemic in Canada, it partnered with Cheerios to do a tribute to food bank workers in a thirty-second commercial.

== Members ==
Food Banks Canada's membership includes 10 Provincial Associations and over 500 local food banks. The 10 Provincial Associations are:

- Food Banks British Columbia
- Food Banks Alberta
- Food Banks of Saskatchewan Corporation
- Manitoba Association of Food Banks
- Ontario Association of Food Banks (OAFB)
- Banques Alimentaires Québec
- Food Depot Alimentaire (New Brunswick)
- FEED NOVA SCOTIA
- P.E.I. Association of Food Banks
- Community Food Sharing Association of Newfoundland & Labrador

== See also ==
- List of food banks
