= Gleaners Food Bank =

Food bank in Indianapolis, Indiana, US

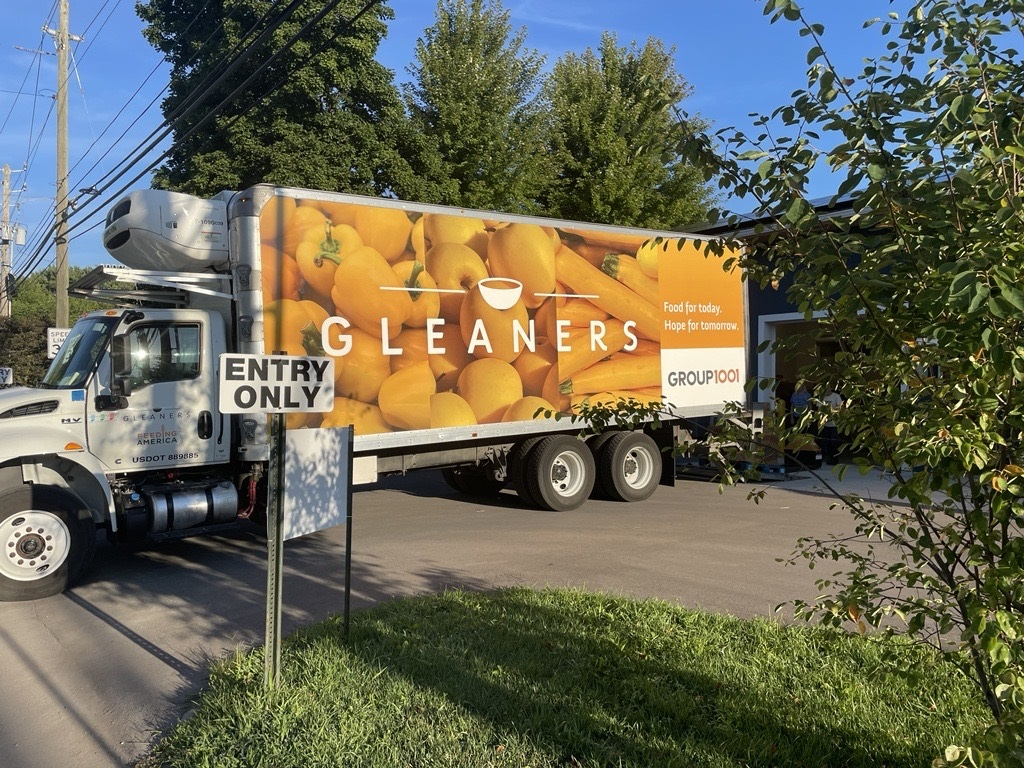
Gleaners Food Bank delivery truck at a food pantry in Indianapolis, Indiana

Gleaners Food Bank was established in 1980 and is the largest food bank in Indiana. In addition to the Indianapolis metropolitan area, it serves 21 counties in Central and Southeastern Indiana. Gleaners Food Bank became an affiliate of Feeding America in 1981. The food bank operates one of eight regional produce cooperatives in the United States, the Midwest Produce Processing Center. The food bank is also a recipient of food and non-food items from Kroger's Central Division Reclamation Center. Gleaners Food Bank serves as a natural disaster response site and as a FEMA storage site. The food bank has made more than 700 million pounds of food available to patrons.

== History ==
Funding to establish the food bank was provided by the Community Action of Greater Indianapolis (CAGI), then known as the Community Action Against Poverty (CAAP), an outcome of Lyndon B. Johnson's War on Poverty and the Economic Opportunity Act of 1964. In its first year of operation, the food bank distributed 83,021 pounds of food to 35 agencies. The following year, the food bank received grants from the Lilly Endowment and Christ Church Cathedral to expand and become an affiliate of Feeding America, the nation's first food bank network.

In 1992 with grants and gifts of $1 million, Gleaners Food Bank renovated facilities and established joint-ownership with the Central Indiana Community Foundation for one of its buildings.

Pam Altmeyer served as the organization's first CEO until 2010. Altmeyer was succeeded by Cynthia Hubert who served until 2016. May 2022, Gleaners announced that Fred Glass would become the organization's fourth president. With Glass's term set to begin on September 1, 2022, he will succeed John Elliot who served as Gleaners' third president from 2016 to 2022.

== Outcomes ==
To date, Gleaners reports that it has made 700 million pounds of food available to patrons.

Gleaners closed to in-person visits from patrons in March 2020 in response to the emerging COVID-19 pandemic. It did not reopen to in-person visits until September 2021. During the COVID-19 pandemic, the food bank experienced both an increase in demand and a decrease in the number of available volunteers. Gleaners needs 500 volunteers per week in order to provide food assistance to Indiana residents.

In 2022, the "Winners Give Milk Drive" set a goal to raise funds to provide 20,000 gallons of milk to Gleaners patrons (roughly one gallon of milk for each visitor during the months of May and June). In connection with the drive, Romain Grosjean, an IndyCar driver, volunteered at the food bank and drove the No. 28 Gleaners Food Bank of Indiana Honda car at the 2022 GMR Prix at Indianapolis Motor Speedway.

== See also ==
- List of food banks
