= Elizabeth House =

Nonprofit food pantry in Maryland, U.S.

Coordinates: 39.09848°N 76.85061°W

Elizabeth House is a nonprofit food pantry and soup kitchen in Laurel, Maryland. It was founded in 1988 and is managed by Fish of Laurel.

== History ==
The Elizabeth House was founded in 1988 and is named after a volunteer veteran Elizabeth "Betty" Colnaghi. In the 1970s, Colnaghi began using her basement as a food pantry to serve low-income residents of the Laurel area. This later grew to include emergency financial aid and transportation. Since the 1990s, leadership at the Elizabeth House has disputed with City of Laurel Officials including City Administrator Ernest Saccanelli and Police Chief Roy Gilmore over how to best help the homeless population. Elizabeth House director, Robert Colnaghi stated that the two officials told him "we should not serve those people from Howard County that we're a magnet for homeless people from Anne Arundel, Howard and Montgomery counties." Saccanelli believes the services offered by social programs including the Elizabeth House attract more homeless to the city.

The Elizabeth House serves people in Prince George's County, Howard County, and Anne Arundel County. The number of people supported by the organization has grown since its foundation. Boy Scouts of America collect donations that provide additional support in the holiday season. In August 1995, Elizabeth House served approximately 50 to 75 homeless people a night. According to Laurel officials, in 1995, the Elizabeth House served roughly 70 to 90 people annually. In November 2011, the Elizabeth House provides three bags of groceries to 20 families a week and 40 bagged lunches a week. In total, its 240 bags of groceries and 1,120 hot meals and bagged lunches a month.

The former Laurel Mall hosted food drives to benefit the Elizabeth House.

== See also ==
- List of food banks
