= Vermont Foodbank =

American anti-hunger organization

The Vermont Foodbank is the largest anti-hunger organization in Vermont.

Started in 1986, the Vermont Foodbank provides charitable food to more than 280 food shelves, meal sites, shelters, senior centers and after-school programs throughout Vermont. According to their website, the Foodbank distributed more than 8.2 million pounds of nutritious food to as many as 86,000 hungry Vermonters in 2013.

== See also ==
- List of food banks
