= Community Action Services and Food Bank =

Non-profit organization in Utah, U.S.

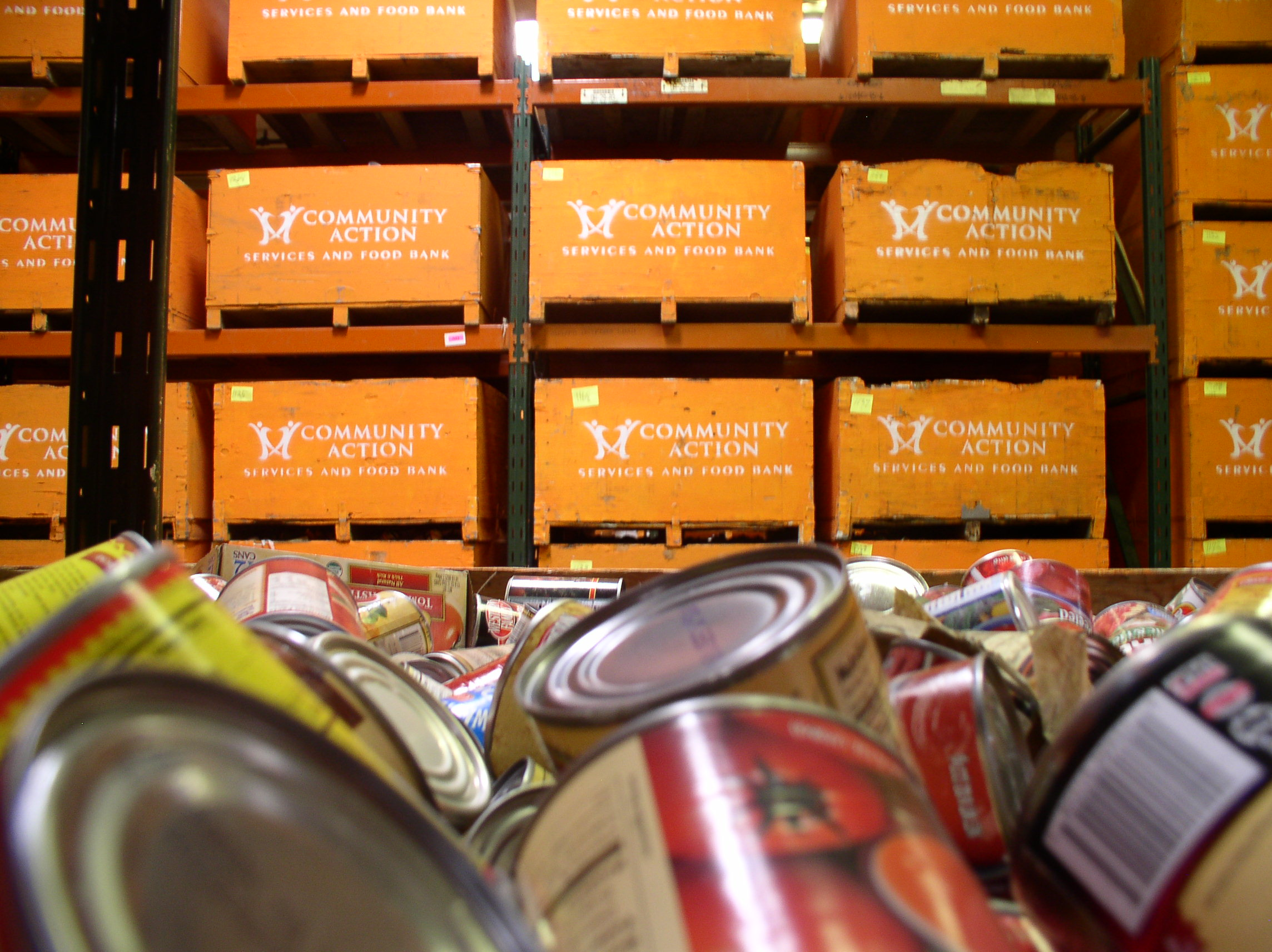
Community Action Services and Food Bank in Provo, Utah

Community Action Services and Food Bank (CASFB), located in Provo, Utah, is a non-profit organization that serves the low-income population of Utah, Summit, and Wasatch counties and focuses on the operation of programs that help alleviate poverty. It was founded in 1967 following the signing of the Economic Opportunity Act in 1964 by President Lyndon B. Johnson and is one of more than 1,000 independent Community Action Agencies across the country. It is sponsored by United Way of Utah County.

The agency's purpose is to assist the disadvantaged in meeting critical basic needs such as food and housing while working with families on a long-term basis to help them increase their potential for financial and social self-sufficiency. It is dedicated to fostering self-reliance in individuals, families and communities. This is accomplished by providing a variety of programs and solutions designed to address local needs and issues. CASFB has been a pioneer in the development of publicly and privately sponsored programs designed to address the needs of the disadvantaged. The organization has a trained staff with many community contacts to help low-income persons evaluate their problems and lead them to resources that can help in solving those problems.

== Programs ==
=== Food Bank ===
The Community Action Food Bank is the second largest food bank in Utah and is the only food bank serving Utah, Wasatch and Summit counties. It is often confused with the Utah Food Bank, which is a separate organization that primarily serves Salt Lake and Tooele counties but also assists food pantries in other counties in the state of Utah. Community Action Food Bank annually distributes more than 2.3 million pounds of food to thousands of families and many local service organizations. Community Action employees and volunteers work to alleviate hunger by providing eligible families with food boxes, counseling, budgeting and referrals. They collect and distribute donated food and hygiene items on a regular basis to more than thirty other agencies, including local pantries, community agencies, churches and senior centers. The Community Action Food Bank also operates five food pantries located in Utah communities Payson, American Fork, Heber, Kamas, and Coalville. An additional satellite office in Park City relies on Community Action for food and other donated items.

=== Family Development Program ===
The Family Development Program helps families become self-reliant by providing short-term assistance to resolve immediate crises, such as help paying for rent or bus tokens, followed by continued support to assist them in attaining financial stability and self-reliance. Support includes haircuts for job applicants, help with resumes and references. The program works with families to increase their potential for social and financial self-sufficiency through goal setting, case management, self-empowerment/self-esteem training, and advocacy assistance.

=== Home Buyer and Mortgage Counseling Program ===
The Home Buyer and Mortgage Counseling Program helps families obtain long-term home ownership through education and counseling. It works toward strengthening communities by identifying resources, advocating ethical practices and assisting with dispute resolutions. Community Action Services and Food Bank is approved by the United States Department of Housing and Urban Development (HUD) as a housing counseling agency. The program provides the following services free of charge: pre-home ownership counseling, home buyer education classes, mortgage default counseling, reverse mortgage counseling, refinance counseling, and predatory lending counseling.

=== HEAT Program ===
Community Action Services and Food Bank administers the Utah State Home Energy Assistance Target (HEAT) Program for Utah, Wasatch and Summit counties. The HEAT Program provides approximately 4,200 eligible low-income households with a once-per-year utility payment to help ease the burden of electricity and heating costs while promoting energy conservation. An energy conservation class is required for first time applicants.

=== Community Services Program ===
Community Action Services and Food Bank helps improve the quality of life for elderly and disabled individuals by connecting them to programs and resources through home and community visits. Community service specialists are available to assist local senior citizens and disabled residents by assessing individual situations and determining eligibility for specific programs. Referrals are also given for other resources that may be beneficial to each individual. Help is provided in completing the forms to apply for the HEAT Program, the Circuit Breaker Program, a property tax abatement, veteran’s abatement, blind abatement, mobile home abatement, or renter refund. Outreach workers are available in local senior citizen centers several times each month. In addition, home visits are arranged for those who are homebound.

=== Youth Program ===
Community Action Services and Food Bank directs the Utah Valley chapter of Trips for Kids, a national program that provides mountain bike experiences and training to local, underprivileged youth. The program helps youth from low-income families resist negative peer pressure and become contributing members of the community by providing mentor support and skills training. Trips for Kids Utah Valley currently holds three six-week sessions each year. Youth ages 12 to 17 who are accepted into a session attend weekly workshops and go on two to three rides in the nearby mountains. Scholarships for registration fees and equipment are available for those who qualify.

=== Community Garden ===
Starting in April of each year, Community Action Services and Food Bank leases small garden plots in its community garden in located behind the Boulders Apartments in Provo. The CASFB Community Garden allows families with limited yard space to grow their own fresh produce alongside their neighbors and other community members. Garden plots are measured in 4-foot by 20-foot rectangles with 4-foot walkways between plots. Watering is provided as a service of the garden, but gardeners are responsible for providing their own tools and seeds.

=== Advocacy and Building Community Solutions ===
Community Action Services and Food Bank works with other community organizations to develop solutions to the problems faced by low and moderate-income Utah residents. It also works to bring about change in local, state, and national policies.

== Organization ==
The Community Action Services and Food Bank board of trustees provides direction and guidance to staff regarding community needs, future planning, and fiscal oversight. It is a tri-partite board consisting of 1/3 public, 1/3 private, and 1/3 low-income representatives, thereby giving low-income residents an opportunity to provide input to agency programs and operations. The agency's annual budget exceeds $1.5 million, and independent external audits are conducted for each fiscal year. Approximately 75 percent of the agency's funds come from grants such as the Community Services Block Grant. Remaining funds come from local sources including the United Way of Utah County and corporate and private donations.

Several local autonomous organizations in Utah had their start at Community Action Services and Food Bank, including Information and Referral, the Volunteer Center, Crisis Line, and others. The agency has also served as a catalyst to coordinate efforts and encourage other organizations to deliver needed services. CASFB is recognized locally for its leadership capabilities, expertise in regard to poverty issues, and ability to provide quality services.

== See also ==
- List of food banks
