= Canstruction =

U.S. nonprofit organization

- Founded: 1992
- Founder: Cheri Melillo
- Type: Non-profit
- Purpose: Help people in need
- Region served: International
- Members: Over 200 cities worldwide
- Website: www.canstruction.org

Canstruction is a United States 501(c)(3) nonprofit organization providing canned food to local food banks in cities holding Canstruction competitions. Canstruction is an international charity competition where architects, engineers, contractors and students they mentor, compete to design and build giant structures made entirely from full cans of food. At the close of the competition all of the food is donated to local food banks where the competitions are held. Canstruction was founded in 1992 by Cheri Melillo and has since raised millions of pounds of food for food banks in participating cities across the world. With more than 170 cities and over 30,000 volunteers participating in Canstruction competitions, Canstruction has grown to become one of the largest food drives for food bank donations in the world.

== History ==
In 1992, Cheri Melillo, creator and editor of the New York Chapter's prize-winning publication "SkyLines" and the National Public Relations Chair for the Society for Design Administration (SDA) in New York, instituted the SDA's Lunch-Time Tours and Administrative Round Table Program.[3] During her tenure as the SDA's National Public Relations Chair she developed Canstruction as a way to bring the design and construction community together to compete in friendly competitions while giving back to the community.[3] Cheri served as volunteer President and Executive Director for 17 years before her death in December 2009 of brain cancer.[3] Cheri's work on Canstruction earned her numerous accolades.  She was made an Honorary Member of the American institute of Architects for her work in developing, marketing and promoting Canstruction in 2000; in 2009 she accepted "The Creativity of the Mind Award from "The Odyssey of the Mind" as well as a Public Service Award from BOMA (Building Owners and Managers Association) in 2007. In 2009 she was the honoree at the City Harvest Practical Magic Ball in New York City;  in earlier years she was honored by The Food Bank of New York City and The Society for Marketing Professional Services; in 1992 she was elected the National SDA Member of the Year. In 2009, City Harvest, the beneficiary of the New York Canstruction competition's food for the last few years, nominated Cheri for the New York Post Liberty Medal in the Lifetime Achievement category.[3]

== Competitions ==
=== Rules and guidelines ===
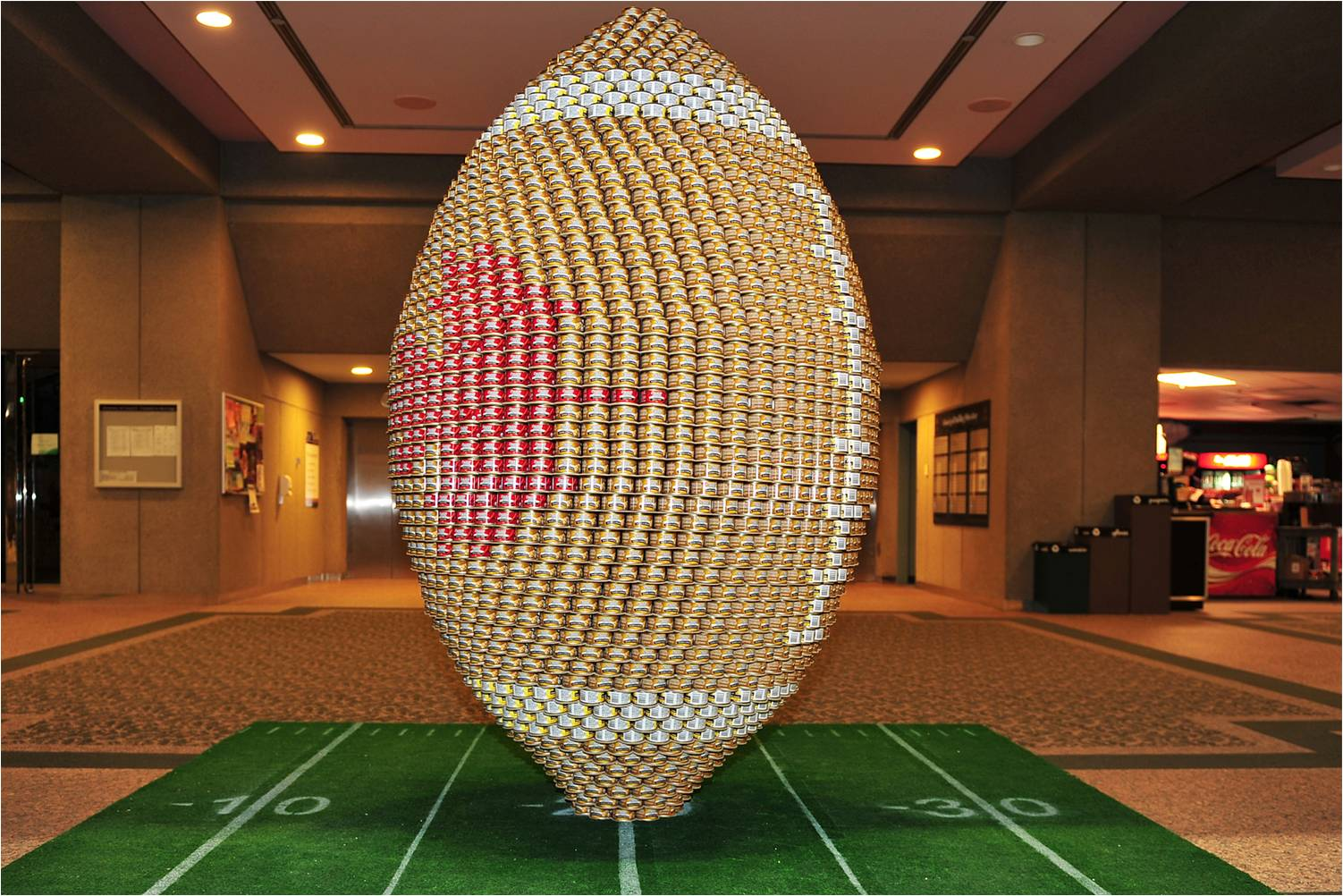
The "Two-point CANversion" can structure from the 2010 Canstruction competition in Calgary, Canada, displays structural ingenuity.

Architects, engineers, designers or contractors must play a pivotal role, either by entering competing teams from their firms or by instructing and leading teams of students, local businesses, clubs or civic organizations. Competitions are spaced at least 50 miles apart and each competition should strive for ten or more entries. Each team is totally responsible for procuring the canned food to be used for the structure. Only 5 people at a time are allowed to actually build the structure. There may be one additional person that assists with un-boxing cans. Team members may be swapped throughout the building process. The structure must be built within the time frame set by local organizers, but not to exceed one 12- to 16-hour day. Minimal supplies outside of cans and boxed food can be used. Cans must be full, unopened and with labels intact; a can with no label cannot be accepted at the food bank.

=== Local competitions ===
Teams of engineers, architects, designers and students mentored by these professionals, compete to design and build giant structures made entirely from full cans of food in their local cities. The local panel of esteemed judges are chosen by the city chairperson and prizes are awarded for various categories, including Jurors' Favorite, Best Use of Labels, Best Meal, Structural Ingenuity and Honorable Mention/Peoples Choice. Sponsorships and co-sponsorships for the competitions vary locally. After the awards have been chosen the winners go on to compete in their category internationally through submission of photography to a national panel of jurors. The local structures are displayed to the general public for up to a week in various exhibits. Visitors to the exhibit sites are encouraged to donate a canned good or non-perishable item as the cost of "admission." All the food used in the sculptures, as well as the items donated by the public, will be delivered to the local food bank at the close of the exhibit.

=== International competition ===
The Annual International Canstruction Competition held in May allows over 135 cities in the United States, Canada, Australia, Hong Kong and South America to compete for the international titles in their respective categories. The categories include Jurors' Favorite, Best Use of Labels, Best Meal, Structural Ingenuity, Honorable Mention and Most Cans. The International Canstruction Competition Convention is held in various cities every year. In 2010, the 14th Annual International Canstruction Competition was held in Las Vegas, Nevada.

== Exhibitions ==
=== Guinness Book of World Records ===
In January 2010, Disney partnered with Canstruction to build the largest canned food structure in history. The structure was built at the Walt Disney World Resort in Lake Buena Vista, Florida, US, and officially broke the Guinness World Record on February 11, 2010. The event was part of the Disney "Celebrate Family Volunteers" press event and the Disney "Give a Day, Get a Disney Day" promotion used to inspire one million people to volunteer a day of service in their communities. The structure consisted of 115,527 cans and when disassembled the cans of food were sent to food banks in Central Florida, Miami and Atlanta.

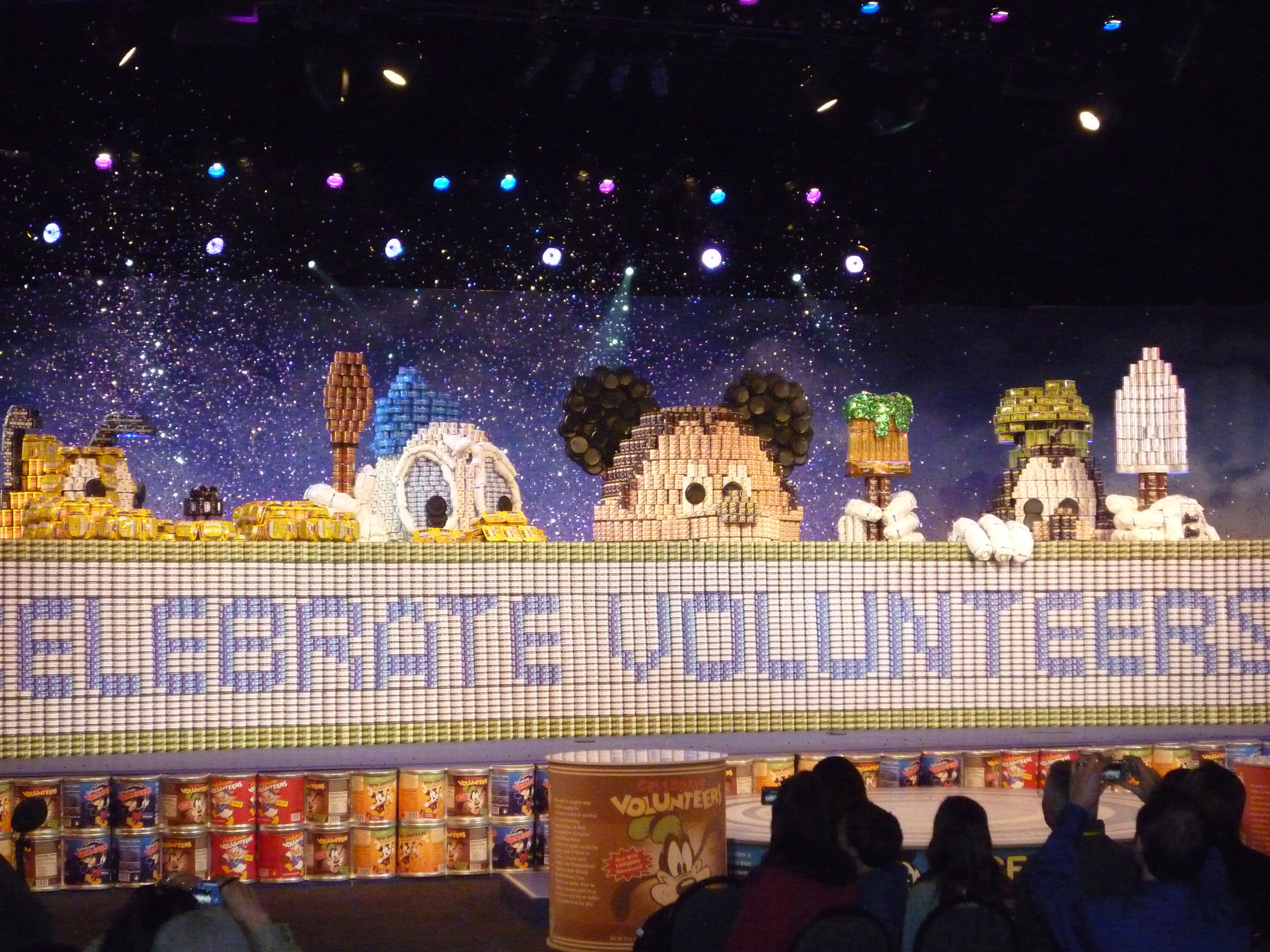
Disney partnered with Canstruction to break a Guinness World-Record for the largest canned-food structure. 115,000 cans were used, enough to provide 70,000 meals to the needy.

== See also ==
- List of food banks
