= Feed Ontario =

Canadian food bank

- Predecessor: Ontario Association of Food Banks (1992–2019)
- Formation: 2019
- Type: food bank network
- Website: https://feedontario.ca/

Feed Ontario, formerly Ontario Association of Food Banks (OAFB), is a food bank network in the Canadian province of Ontario. Feed Ontario represents more than 1,200 food banks and hunger relief organizations in Ontario, and serves more than 1 million people each year.

== 2024 Hunger Report ==
The 2024 report shows that the food banks usage across Ontario has increased drastically year on year and has been stretched to its limits. With over 1/3rd of food banks reporting having to reduce the amount of food they can provide during a visit.

- 1,001,105 unique individuals accessed food banks across Ontario. This is an increase of 25% compared to the previous year, and 86% since 2019–2020
- 7,689,580 total visits, an increase of 31% compared to the previous year, and 134% since 2019–2020.
- 43% of visitors were new, an increase of 43% since 2019–2020
- 71% of visitors were adults, and 29% children
- Every region in Ontario experienced a double digit percent increase in food bank use over the previous year
- 53.1% of food bank clients are single-people households
- 88.2% of clients are either rental or social housing tenants
- 24% of food bank households are people with employment as their primary source of income, this is 2x the rate pre-pandemic

== History ==
=== Ontario Association of Food Banks ===
Ontario Association of Food Banks
- Abbreviation: OAFB
- Successor: Feed Ontario
- Formation: 1992
- Dissolved: 2019
- Website: http://www.oafb.ca (defunct)

Founded in 1992, the OAFB represented 125 food banks, and over 1,100 hunger-relief organizations across the province, including: urban and rural food banks, community kitchens, breakfast clubs and school meal programs, community food centres, emergency shelters, and seniors' facilities. The mission of the Ontario Association of Food Banks was to "strengthen communities by providing food banks with food, resources, and solutions that address both short and long-term food insecurity."

Every year, the OAFB released a research report on hunger and food bank use in Ontario. This has continued after the rebranding.

In 2015, the OAFB Hunger Report revealed:

- 358,963 people accessed food banks across Ontario in March 2015, with 120,554 of those clients being children under 18 years of age
- 35% increase in senior citizens visiting food banks over the previous year
- 49% of food bank clients are single-person households
- 90% of food bank clients are either rental or social housing tenants
- Over 12% of senior citizens fall below Ontario's Low Income Measure. This number more than doubles to 27% when looking at seniors who also identify as single
- Senior citizens are expected to represent 23% of the population by 2030
- Single person households represent almost 50% of those who visit food banks, an 11% increase over the past 5 years
- The average food bank client spends 70% of their income on rent, leaving very little for all other necessities
- 1 in 3 jobs in Ontario is temporary, contract, or part-time. An individual working full-time, at minimum-wage will have an annual income of approximately $21,000, falling well below Ontario's Low Income Measure

In 2007, the OAFB had been noted for innovative programming by The Globe and Mail and the Toronto Star.

=== Rebranding ===
On 11 February 2019, the organization changed its name to 'Feed Ontario' to better reflect its modern activities that have evolved since the past.

== See also ==
- List of food banks
