= Foodbank Canterbury =

Foodbank in Christchurch, New Zealand

Foodbank Canterbury was a foodbank in Christchurch, New Zealand. It was Christchurch's largest foodbank. As of December 2020, the charity delivered 9,000 meals to people every day, and redirected 100 tonnes of food away from landfills into the community per month. It was run by John and Janice Milligan, and was a member of the Global Foodbanking Network. In 2021 it was reported that Foodbank Canterbury provided food to 200,000 New Zealanders each month.

== History ==
Foodbank Canterbury started around 2015, originally named City Harvest. In 2018, the charity won the Westpac Business Champions Supreme Award for Small Enterprises for "community impact" and the Christchurch City Council Business For Good award.

Foodbank Canterbury opened a branch in Timaru in July 2019. In August, Foodbank Canterbury opened a "food rescue centre", which was the first in South Canterbury.

During the COVID-19 pandemic, Foodbank Canterbury received over 30 requests for food each day, compared to the four food requests each week that they received before the pandemic. They said that they were 28% short on demand. Foodbank Canterbury applied for Coordinated Incident Management System funding that year, but was denied.

=== Closure ===
In early December 2023, Foodbank Canterbury announced that they would be closing before Christmas due to rising costs. Foodbank Canterbury had to introduce a service fee due to the rising costs, which made them ineligible for council funding. The charity called for Government help, saying that Foodbank Canterbury would need $1 million to continue operating.

After the announcement, Woolworths started funding charities that would be affected by the closure.

== Operations ==
Foodbank Canterbury received their food from supermarkets, manufacturers and farmers, a men's prison in the area, and donations. The food was then distributed to charities; as of December 2020, they supported 125 charities.

Foodbank Canterbury had "full-time sub-hubs" in Timaru and the West Coast.
