= Food Bank of Delaware =

Non-profit organization in Delaware, United States

- Formation: 1981
- Type: Nonprofit
- Location: Delaware, United States
- Website: fbd.org

The Food Bank of Delaware, a member of Feeding America, is a Delaware-based, statewide nonprofit agency whose mission is a community free of hunger.

== Overview ==
Founded in 1981 as the Food Conservers, Inc., FBDE has provided food assistance for more than 40 years to Delawareans at risk of hunger. The organization has grown from an organization that served 50 agencies out of a basement in the Northeast State Social Service Center in Wilmington to a statewide hunger-relief organization with operations in both New Castle and Kent Counties.

Today FBDE is the only facility in Delaware with the equipment, warehouse, and staff to collect donations from all sectors of the food industry and safely and efficiently redistribute them to those who need it most. Annually, it distributes approximately 15 million pounds of food from all sectors of the food industry including fresh produce, meats, shelf-stable foods, dairy products and more.

== Logistics ==
The Food Bank of Delaware acquires donated food from local retailers, wholesalers, manufacturers, food drives and growers as well as from national food donors as a member of Feeding America. During fiscal year 2021 it received more than 15 million pounds of food from community food drives and the food industry. The organization also purchases food at a wholesale price from food distributors to compensate for needed items not received by donations.

== See also ==
- List of food banks
