= Foodsi =

Polish mobile application for food waste limitation

Foodsi sp.z o.o.
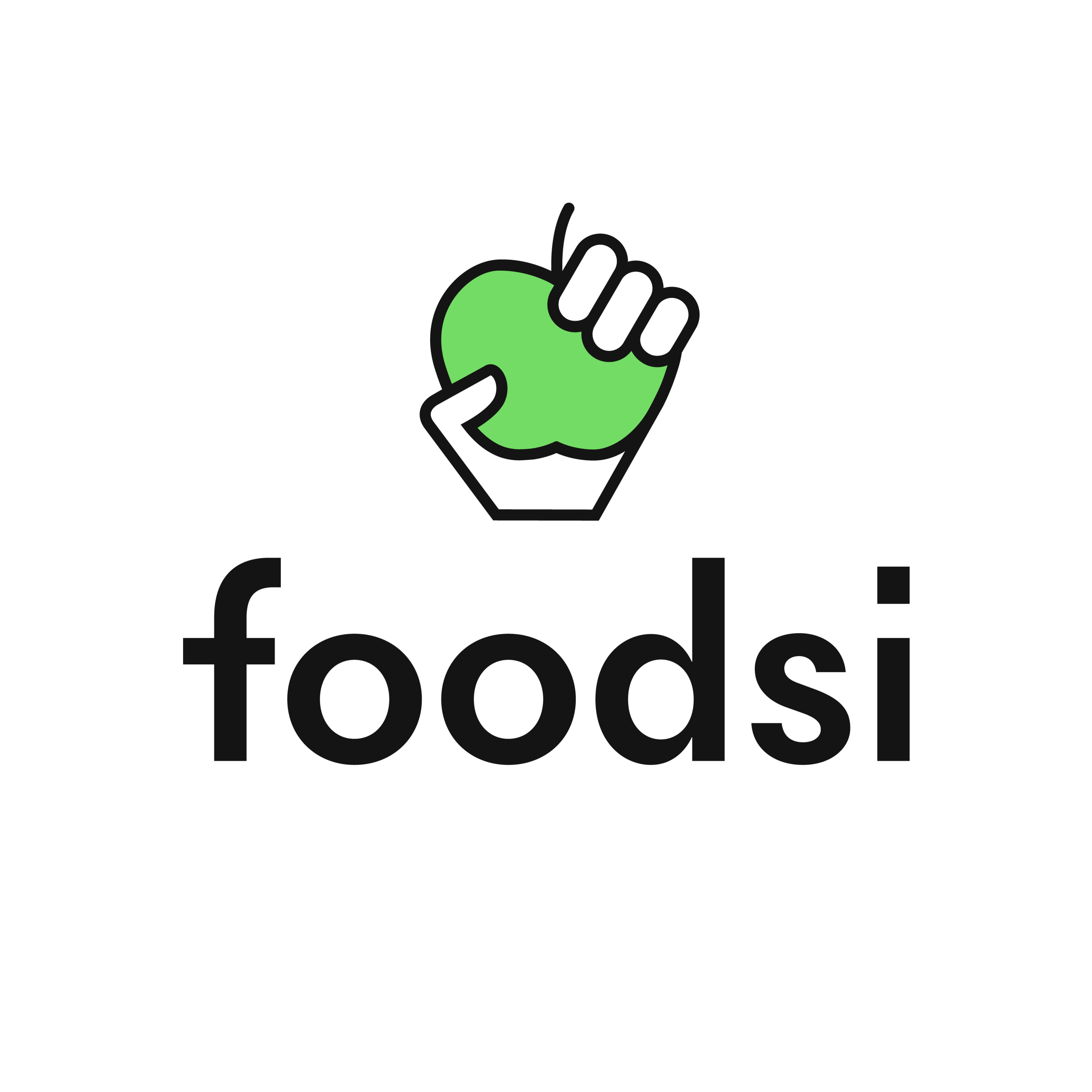
- Company type: Private
- Industry: Mobile app
- Founded: 2019; 7 years ago in Poland
- Founders: Mateusz Kowalczyk, Jakub Fryszczyn
- Areas served: Poland
- Website: www.foodsi.pl

Foodsi is a Polish mobile application that connects customers with restaurants, convenience stores, bakeries and cafes that have a surplus of food, allowing its users to buy the surplus at a reduced price. The service launched in 2019 in Warsaw and has expanded to other major cities in Poland.

In 2023, a new feature was introduced in the app, allowing users to buy packages not only with self-pickup but also with delivery. The products range has also been expanded to include unsold magazines, cosmetics or plants.

== History ==
The company was created in 2019 in Poland by Mateusz Kowalczyk and Jakub Fryszczyn. During studies in their home country and abroad, when they made a living working in restaurants and bakeries, they recognized the problem and the scale of food waste. They launched the application by themselves, having previously raised PLN 100,000 on their own for the purpose. Initially, Foodsi was an Android-only app, but over time, an IOS version was developed.

In 2022, the startup raised PLN 6 million in a seed round from VC companies including CofounderZone and Status Starter, as well as private investors such as founders of Pyszne.pl.

As of December 2023, it claimed more than 5000 businesses, serving over 1,5 million users, have saved nearly 3 million bags of food.

== Purpose ==
Foodsi aims to significantly reduce food waste, which contributes to the Sustainable Development Goals. The application bridges the gap between the customers who are looking for shopping deals and the companies that want to reduce surplus products but are unable to sell them at a normal price. This allows the customers to buy unsold products for as little as 30% of the normal price. The company claims that every 4 out of 5 packages are sold on average.

As of 2019 Foodsi employed more than 30 people. By 2024 it was more than 50. For now, Foodsi operates in major Polish cities such as Warsaw, Kraków, Trójmiasto, Wrocław, Poznań etc. However, in the upcoming years, Foodsi plans to expand to other countries.

== Use ==
To start selling surplus, a company must leave Foodsi its contact information to register in the system. Registration in the app is completely free of charge. Then, companies offer available packages anticipating what won’t be sold and post them in the app along with the price so that users can buy them and pick them up. Companies can put their packages in the app at any time during the day. Users can pick up packages from bakeries, grocery stores, restaurants, but also florists and beauty stores. Foodsi charges a small commission on each package from the cooperating companies.

If a user wants to start ordering packages from Foodsi, he or she needs to install the app on their mobile phone (Android or IOS) and register an account. The app displays a list of restaurants and other venues available in a specific region set by the user's location. Customers can see the price, address, distance and time range for package pickup. Packages are usually in the form of so-called 'surprise-packages', meaning that customers do not know specifically what kind of food/product will be inside. Some restaurants offer a choice of different package sizes. Prices are up to 70% lower than those of the original products. Customers have to show up at the restaurant to pick up the package using their phone at a time specified in the app.

== Awards ==
- Auler All-Stars 2025 - 3rd place
- Deloitte Technology Fast 50 - 2025 Central Europe
- Executive Club - Innowacja Roku: Żywność i Rolnictwo - Wyróżnienie (2025)
- Stena Circular Economy Award - Lider Gospodarki Obiegu Zamkniętego (2025) - wyróżnienie w kategorii start-up wdrażający GOZ na rynku polskim
- 255th place in the international poll FoodTech 500 2025
- Finalist for the EY Entrepreneur Of The Year™ 2025
- Wpływowi 2024 - Laureat w kategorii “Zrównoważony rozwój”
- Supplier of the Year 2024 - XXII Food & Business Forum
- Supplier of the Year 2024 - VII Sweets & Coffee Forum
- Innovative Leader 2024 - Leader in Food / Food-Tech Category - Executive Summit
- “Orzeł Innowacji - Start-up z potencjałem Polska-Świat” (Rzeczpospolita, 2024)
- 102nd place in the international poll FoodTech 500 2024
- Auler 2023
- Startup of the Year 2023 according to money.pl
- Start(up) w zrównoważoną przyszłość Kongresu Kompas ESG 2023
- Marka Godna Zaufania according to My Company Polska 2023
- 184th place in the international poll FoodTech 500 2023

In 2023, Foodsi co-founder Mateusz Kowalczyk was recognized by Forbes magazine and included in its "30 before 30" list.
