= The Food Trust =

US nonprofit organization

The Food Trust is a Philadelphia-based nonprofit organization with the goal of improving the health of children and adults by providing better nutrition. The Food Trust works with neighborhoods, schools, grocers, farmers and policymakers to implement a comprehensive approach to improved food access that combines nutrition education and greater availability of affordable, healthy food. It operates farmers' markets in the Philadelphia region which accept SNAP/food stamps (EBT/Access cards), Farmers' Market Nutrition Program vouchers and Philly Food Bucks. The Food Trust is funded by private foundations, government grants, and individual donors.

== History ==
In 1992, The Food Trust, then known as The Farmers' Market Trust, was founded by Duane Perry. It began directing nutrition education classes for inner-city children at Reading Terminal Market, a Philadelphia farmer's market. The organization proceeded to open its first farmer's market at Tasker Homes, a public housing development in the Grays Ferry neighborhood of Philadelphia. Once a week, with the help of the Tasker Homes Tenant Council, the organization's small staff set up one long table of produce. "People hadn't seen that kind of quality produce in their neighborhood before," The Food Trust founder Duane Perry recalls. In the two decades since the opening of the Tasker Homes market, The Food Trust has worked with neighborhoods, schools, grocers, farmers and policymakers in Philadelphia and across the country to change public understanding of healthy food and to increase its availability.

== Partners ==
The Food Trust has a private–public partnership with Pennsylvania Fresh Food Financing Initiative (FFFI). Since its launch in 2004, FFFI has funded 83 supermarket projects throughout the state. The $85 million partnership is managed by The Reinvestment Fund. It has provided funding for 88 fresh-food retail projects in 34 Pennsylvania counties, creating or preserving more than 5,023 jobs.

In 2013, the three organizations launched the Healthy Food Access Portal to bring together the growing body of research, tools, and resources for food access advocates, practitioners, and food system entrepreneurs. This site uses data and resources to equip communities with the tools and information needed to plan and implement equitable policies, programs, and projects, as well as to launch food system businesses that improve access to food in low-income communities and communities of color.

The organization also hosts events alongside the Greater Philadelphia Coalition Against Hunger and Philabundance.

== Markets ==
=== Currently Operated By The Food Trust ===
- Fairmount – 22nd Street at Fairmount Avenue
- Clark Park Thursday – 43rd Street at Baltimore Avenue
- Headhouse – 2nd Street at Lombard Street
- 4th & Lehigh – 4th Street & Lehigh Avenue
- 52nd & Haverford – Haverford Avenue outside Spectrum Health
- Castor & Hellerman – Castor Avenue & Hellerman Street

=== Previously Operated By The Food Trust ===
- 10th & Germantown – 10th Street at Germantown Avenue
- Schuylkill River Park – 25th Street at Spruce Street
- Kingsessing – 58th Street at Chester Street
- Haddington Friday – 52nd Street at Haverford Avenue
- Strawberry Mansion – North 33rd Street at Diamond Street
- Palmer Park – Frankford Avenue at East Palmer Street
- Norris Square – West Susquehanna Avenue at Howard Street
- Schuylkill River Park – 25th Street at Spruce Street
- Point Breeze – 22nd Street at Tasker Street
- Frankford Transportation Center – Bustleton Avenue at Frankford Avenue
- Schuylkill River Park – 25th Street at Spruce Street
- Oxford Circle – Oxford Circle Mennonite Church, 900 East Howell Street
- Broad & Ritner – Broad Street at Ritner Street
- Grays Ferry – 29th Street at Wharton Street
- Broad & South – Broad Street at South Street
- Cecil B. Moore – Cecil B. Moore Avenue at Broad Street
- Overbrook Farms – Overbrook Presbyterian Church, Lancaster Avenue at City Avenue
- Germantown – Germantown Avenue at Walnut Lane
- Hunting Park – West Hunting Park Avenue at Old York Road
- Haddington Wednesday – 52nd Street at Haverford Avenue
- Olney Transportation Center – Broad Street at Olney Street
- West Oak Lane – Ogontz Avenue at 72nd Avenue
- Cliveden Park – Chew Avenue at Johnson Street
