= Brent Suter =

American baseball player (born 1989)

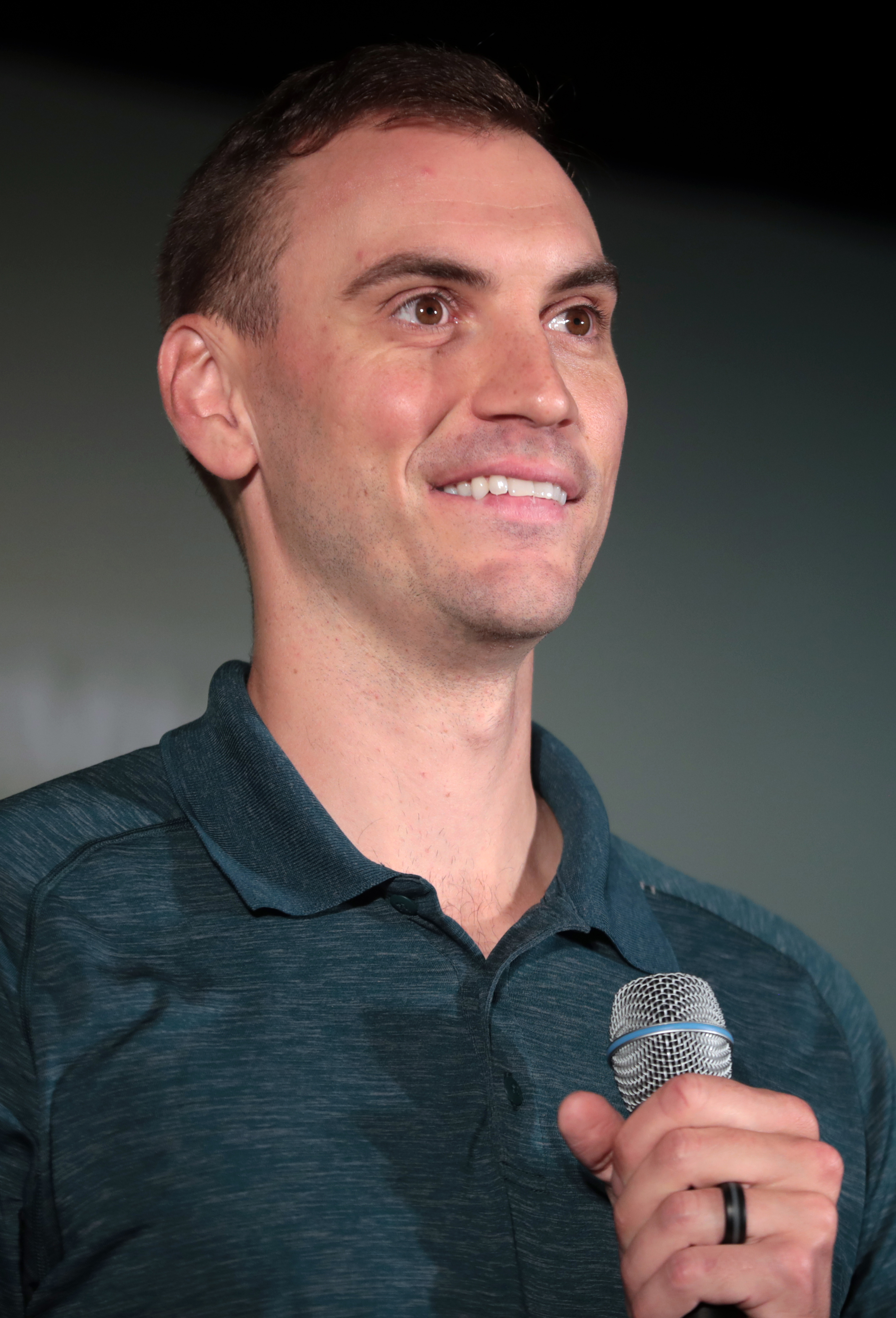

Free agent
- Pitcher
- Born: August 29, 1989 (age 37); Chicago, Illinois, U.S.
- Bats: Left Throws: Left

MLB debut
- August 19, 2016, for the Milwaukee Brewers

MLB statistics (through 2026 season)
- Win–loss record: 45–26
- Earned run average: 3.54
- Strikeouts: 574
- Stats at Baseball Reference

Teams
- Milwaukee Brewers (2016–2022); Colorado Rockies (2023); Cincinnati Reds (2024–2025); Los Angeles Angels (2026); Atlanta Braves (2026)

Brent Michael Suter (born August 29, 1989) is an American professional baseball pitcher who is a free agent. He has played in Major League Baseball (MLB) for the Milwaukee Brewers, Colorado Rockies, Cincinnati Reds, Los Angeles Angels, and Atlanta Braves.

== Amateur career ==
Suter played high school baseball at Archbishop Moeller High School in Cincinnati, Ohio. He attended Harvard University and played college baseball for the Harvard Crimson. Suter majored in environmental science and public policy at Harvard, graduating in 2012. In 2009 and 2010, he played collegiate summer baseball for the Hamilton Joes of the Great Lakes Summer Collegiate League. In 2011, he played collegiate summer baseball with the Wareham Gatemen of the Cape Cod Baseball League. He was drafted by the Milwaukee Brewers in the 31st round of the 2012 Major League Baseball draft.

== Professional career ==
=== Milwaukee Brewers ===
After signing, Suter made his professional debut with the Helena Brewers where he was 4–2 with a 3.92 ERA in 12 games (11 starts). He also played in three games for the Wisconsin Timber Rattlers at the end of the season. He began 2013 with Wisconsin, and after posting a 1.80 ERA in three starts, he was promoted to the Brevard County Manatees and finished the season there, going 7–9 with a 3.63 ERA in 21 games (20 starts). In 2014, he pitched for the Huntsville Stars where he was 10–10 with a 3.96 ERA in 28 games (27 starts), and in 2015, he played with both the Biloxi Shuckers and the Colorado Springs Sky Sox, pitching to an 8–4 record and a 2.36 ERA in 26 games (17 starts). He began 2016 with Colorado Springs.

Suter was promoted to the major leagues on August 19, 2016. In 26 games for Colorado Springs prior to his promotion he was 6–6 with a 3.50 ERA. Suter made his MLB debut that night against the Seattle Mariners at Safeco Field. He spent the remainder of the season with Milwaukee, compiling a 2–2 record with a 3.32 ERA in 14 games (12 being relief appearances). Suter spent 2017 with both Colorado Springs and Milwaukee. In ten games for the Sky Sox he was 3–1 with a 4.42 ERA, and in 22 games for Milwaukee, he was 3–2 with a 3.42 ERA.

Suter began 2018 with Milwaukee. On May 8, 2018, against the Cleveland Indians, he hit his first career home run off of Corey Kluber that went 433 feet to center field. On July 31, 2018, Suter underwent Tommy John surgery on his left elbow, ending his 2018 season prematurely.

Suter began the 2019 season on the injured list as he continued to recover from his Tommy John surgery. He was activated on September 1 and allowed just one run in 18 1/3 innings in relief and was named National League reliever of the month for September. The next season, Suter had a solid year, recording a 2–0 record and a 3.13 ERA with 38 strikeouts in 31 2/3 innings pitched. In 2020, Suter was nominated for the Roberto Clemente Award.

In 2021, Suter posted a 12–5 record with a 3.07 ERA and 69 strikeouts in 73 1/3 innings. He led the major leagues with 12 relief wins.

=== Colorado Rockies ===
On November 18, 2022, Suter was claimed off waivers by the Colorado Rockies. He signed a one-year, $3 million contract to avoid arbitration. Over 57 appearances, Suter had a 4–3 record with a 3.49 ERA and 55 strikeouts in 69 1/3 innings pitched. He declared free agency on November 2, 2023.

=== Cincinnati Reds ===
On January 13, 2024, Suter signed a one-year contract worth $3 million with a club option for the 2025 season with the Cincinnati Reds. He made 47 appearances (including three starts) for Cincinnati during the regular season, logging a 1-0 record and 3.15 ERA with 50 strikeouts and two saves across 65 2/3 innings pitched. On November 1, Suter signed a new one-year contract with the Reds, containing an option for 2026.

Suter pitched in 48 total contests for the Reds during the 2025 season, compiling a 1-2 record and 4.52 ERA with 53 strikeouts across 67 2/3 innings pitched. On November 5, 2025, the Reds declined his 2026 option, making him a free agent.

=== Los Angeles Angels ===
On February 6, 2026, Suter signed a one-year, $1.25 million contract with the Los Angeles Angels. Suter made 41 appearances (including three starts) for Los Angeles, compiling a 1–2 record and 4.12 ERA with 55 strikeouts across 63 1/3 innings pitched.

=== Atlanta Braves ===
On August 3, 2026, the Angels traded Suter to the Atlanta Braves in exchange for Nacho Alvarez Jr.

== Personal life ==
Suter and his wife, Erin, were married in 2015, and reside in Cincinnati, Ohio. Together, they have three sons.

Suter wrote a children's book titled The Binky Bandit that was released on June 6, 2022.

Suter was named the 2025 winner of the Marvin Miller Man of the Year award for community service. He served on the board of the Reds Community Fund, worked with Cincinnati Children’s Hospital to host a “reverse autograph signing” where young patients signed cards for Reds players and participated in Make-A-Wish events. Suter supports the Joe Nuxhall Miracle League, offering inclusive baseball opportunities for athletes with disabilities. He worked with La Soupe to rescue surplus food and serves as an ambassador for Players for the Planet and the Ocean Conservancy. His “Protect Where We Play” initiative promotes reducing plastic waste at sports venues.
