= Waste No Food =

US non-profit organization

- Formation: 2011
- Type: Non-profit
- Headquarters: Silicon Valley
- Founder: Kiran Sridhar
- Website: wastenofood.org

Waste No Food is a non-profit organization in the US that provides a web-based food rescue "marketplace" allowing excess food to be donated from the food service industry to qualified charities that work with the needy. It facilitates the donation of food waste from farms, restaurants and grocery stores to shelters and charities that can use it. Recipient charities are vetted by InnVision. Users can sign up to donate food using the Waste No Food app on Google Play, ITunes or the official website.

== Background ==
The nonprofit was founded in 2011 by Kiran Sridhar, then a 12-year-old 7th grader at a Bay Area school, as a way to improve the distribution of food and reduce waste. Sridhar received the Gloria Barron Prize for Young Heroes in 2014, at the age of 16. PayPal provided funding and engineers to help launch the initiative, which also had partners in Appcelerator and Winwire.

As of 2026, Sridhar continues to head the organization. Waste No Food was initially focused in the Silicon Valley area and expanded to San Francisco.

== Impact ==
Waste No Food had delivered over 1,000,000 meals by the end of 2015. Its partners include Levi's Stadium, the City of San Jose Mayor's Office, PayPal and the San Francisco 49ers. Waste No Food Tampa Bay is a partnership between Waste No Food and the Tampa Bay Network to End Hunger, with the goal of eradicating hunger.
