= The Farmlink Project =

US-based non-profit organization

- Formation: 2020
- Type: Non-profit
- Purpose: Food rescue, food excess, food insecurity
- Region served: United States
- Founders: James Kanoff, Aidan Reilly, Ben Collier, Will Collier, Max Goldman, Stella Delp
- CEO: Ben Collier
- Staff: 20
- Volunteers: 650
- Website: www.farmlinkproject.org

The Farmlink Project is a United States–based non-profit organization that combats food waste by collecting excess produce from farms and other food donors across America and delivering it to organizations that serve food insecure communities. Since its founding in 2020, the organization has rescued over 130 million pounds of food, distributed to over 400 communities, and grown to a network of over 600 volunteers nationwide.

The Farmlink Project has raised over $15 million in fundraising efforts, and has partnered with organizations such as Chipotle, Kroger, and Uber Freight.

== History ==
The Farmlink Project was founded in Los Angeles in April 2020 by James Kanoff and Aidan Reilly, both juniors in college at the time. Additional founding team members included Ben Collier, Will Collier, Owen Dubeck, Jordan Hartzell, Max Goldman, AJ Weaver and Stella Delp.

At the time, due to the onset of the COVID-19 pandemic, the food banking system in America was experiencing extraordinary levels of demand while millions of pounds of fresh goods went to waste on farms due to factors such as supply chain disruptions and the closures of restaurants, hotels, and schools. In reaction, Kanoff and Reilly—along with dozens of other college student volunteers—began cold calling farms around the state of California to inquire about their surplus produce and determine methods for food rescue and distribution. The organization's first operation consisted of renting a U-Haul truck and driving out to Trafficanda Egg Ranches to rescue a surplus of 10,800 eggs, which was delivered to Westside Food Bank in Los Angeles.

The Farmlink Project has since grown to a full-time team of over 20 employees and a network of over 600 volunteers nationwide. The organization's current model consists of sourcing surplus from food donors, matching it to local nonprofit food distribution centers, and coordinating the transportation logistics to deliver the produce. The Farmlink Project focuses specifically on locating and collecting food that would otherwise go to waste due to factors such as limited shelf life or not meeting industry standards for the typical market. The organization works with a turnaround time of 1–2 business days and has the capacity to rescue high quantities of produce, which saves farmers from unnecessary dump fees or having to coordinate a donation themselves.

== Impact ==
Since its founding, The Farmlink Project has moved more than 130 million pounds of surplus food from donors to food banks and other food distribution centers. The organization estimates that it has mitigated more than 350 million pounds of carbon dioxide-equivalent emissions by diverting produce from landfills. It has coordinated food rescue operations with more than 120 farms and more than 300 communities in 48 states, including the Navajo Nation.

== Awards and recognition ==
The Farmlink Project and its founders have gained widespread recognition for their efforts, receiving numerous awards and honors since 2020. Co-founders Kanoff and Reilly were awarded 2021 Congressional Medal of Honor Society Citizen Honors and included in the Forbes 30 Under 30 for Social Impact in 2022 list, while Kanoff, Reilly, and Ben Collier received a Jefferson Award for Public Service in November 2022. Kanoff was also nominated for the 2021 Pritzker Emerging Environmental Genius Award. The organization won the 2023 Goalkeepers Global Goals Award from the Bill & Melinda Gates Foundation. The Farmlink Project's work has been featured in The New York Times, CNN, ABC World News Tonight, and major national television networks in the US.

== See also ==
- World Central Kitchen
