= Second Harvest Toronto =

Canadian charitable organization

Second Harvest
- Founded: April 1985; 41 years ago
- Founders: Ina Andre and Joan Clayton
- Registration no.: 13386 5477 RR0001
- Location: Toronto, Ontario
- Region served: Canada
- CEO: Lori Nikkel
- Board chair: Karen White-Boswell
- Revenue: $286.2 million (2023)
- Expenses: $285.3 million (2023)
- Website: secondharvest.ca

Second Harvest is Canada's largest food rescue charitable organization.

Second Harvest works with thousands of food businesses from across the supply chain to reduce the amount of edible food going to waste. This model helps redirect surplus food to thousands of charities and non-profits across Canada.

== History and timeline ==
Second Harvest was founded in April 1985 in Toronto by Ina Andre and Joan Clayton. Under the direction of Andre and Clayton, the organization started small and consisted of picking up waste food in a hatchback from restaurants and grocery stores, distributing it across the city.

1994 — Ontario Legislature passed the “Donation of Food Act” or Good Samaritan Legislation releasing those who donate food or distribute donated food from liability in the event that an individual is affected by the consumption of that food, provided that due diligence is exercised. This act enabled Second Harvest to accept donations from large food corporations, helping the organization to grow substantially.

April 2015 — Second Harvest marked 30 years of delivering fresh, surplus food to Toronto's hungry.

July 2, 2018 — Lori Nikkel becomes the organization's first chief executive officer.

October 26, 2018 — Second Harvest launches the Second Harvest Food Rescue App, a free tool for businesses to donate excess food.

January 17, 2019 — Second Harvest releases The Avoidable Crisis of Food Waste, a world-first report co-authored Value Chain Management International, identifying the amount of food that is lost and wasted across the Canadian supply chain and the approximately 30 root causes of food loss and waste and over 100 solutions to limit the amount lost and wasted. This report identifies that in Canada 58% of all food produced for Canadians is lost or wasted and over 11MM tonnes could be redirected to support communities in need.

June 11, 2019 — Second Harvest expanded operations into British Columbia

April 2020 - Second Harvest expands operations across the country.
