= Greater Philadelphia Coalition Against Hunger =

American non-profit organization

- Type: Non-profit
- Founded: 1996
- Defunct: July 28, 2025
- Headquarters: Philadelphia, Pennsylvania,
- Key people: Laura Wall, (executive director)

The Greater Philadelphia Coalition Against Hunger (GPCAH) was a support organization for residents in the Greater Philadelphia region founded in 1996. Its mission was to connect people with food assistance programs including, SNAP benefits, food banks, soup kitchens and "to build a community where all people have the food they need to lead healthy lives".

The Greater Philadelphia Coalition Against Hunger closed on June 28, 2025. According to leadership, the organization had been struggling to find funding for years prior to closure. Fallowing this announcement, GPCAH stopped all operations and ceased maintaining its previous website, "http://www.hungercoalition.org".

== History ==
The Greater Philadelphia Coalition Against Hunger was founded in 1996 as an organization which can help network people to food, shelter and connections with Supplemental Nutrition Assistance Program (SNAP) benefits. In 2019 Alyssa Bradley, advocacy and communications associate stated "we are working to help out in a couple of different ways. We are helping folks sign up for SNAP benefits if they do qualify". Kathy Fisher, policy director wants to eradicated the stigma that views food stamps users as "freeloaders".

During the 2018 "Eaglesgiving" event, Laura Wall, executive director of the GPCAH, worked with the Philadelphia Eagles to assist in selecting the Feast of Justice. She was impressed with the effort the Eagles put into the event.

In 2019, the United States federal government shutdown delayed SNAP benefits from being received prompting phone calls from SNAP recipients to GPCAH. The organization worked "to connect government workers affected by the shutdown with Supplemental Nutrition Assistance Program (SNAP) benefits".

In early July 2025 GPCAH announced that they would be closing down on June 28, 2025, after 28 years in operation.

== Stroehmann Walk + Run Against Hunger ==
The Coalition organized the annual Stroehmann Walk+Run Against Hunger, which was a 5K race held in April that raised funds for more than 100 food pantries, soup kitchens and hunger-relief agencies in Southeastern Pennsylvania and South Jersey.

The Walk+Run Against also benefited the region's leading hunger-relief agencies, including the Coalition Against Hunger, The Food Trust, SHARE Food Program and Philabundance.
