= Reading Terminal Market =

Shopping center in Philadelphia

Coordinates: 39.953395°N 75.159008°W

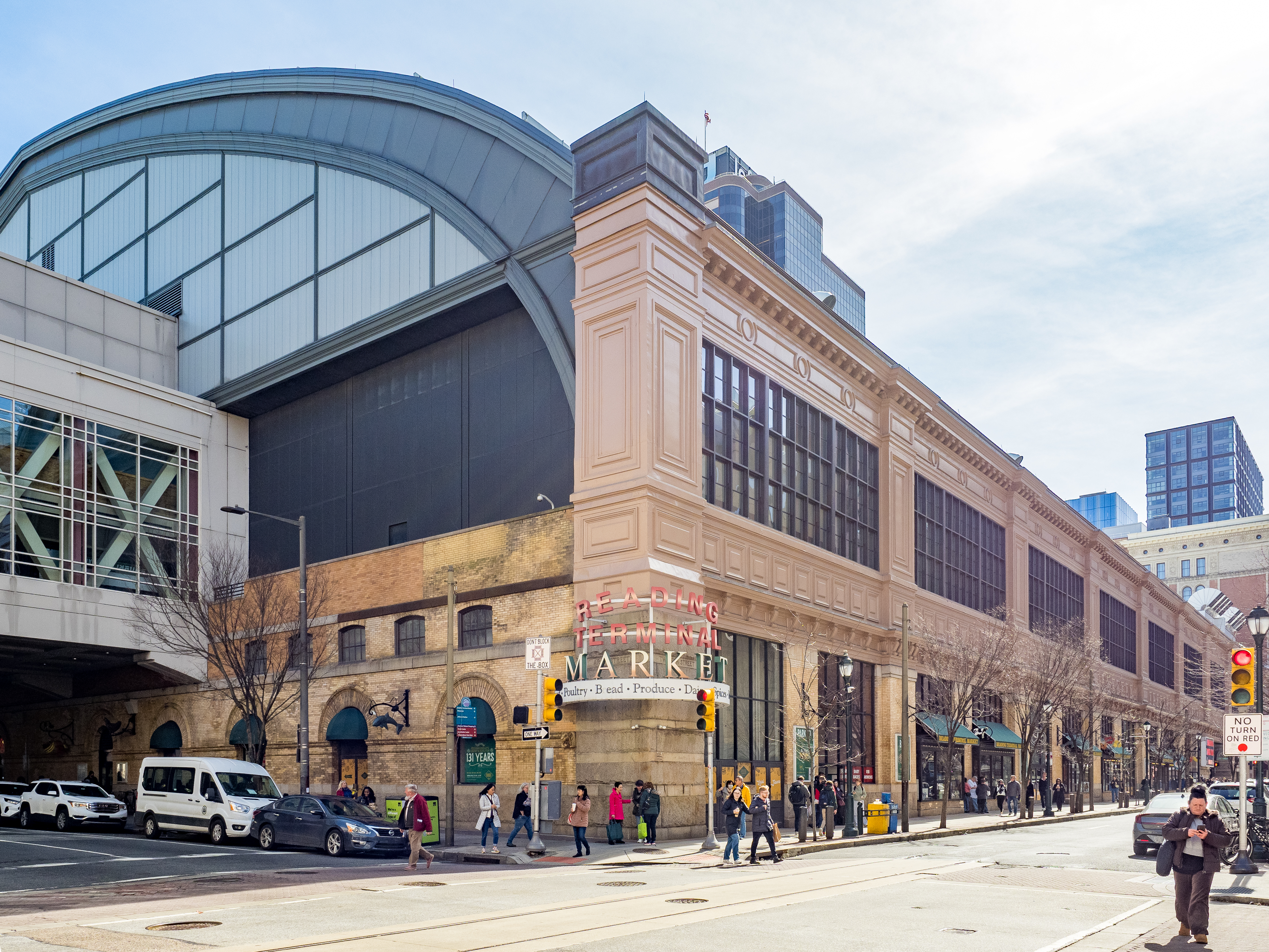
Reading Terminal Market in March 2024

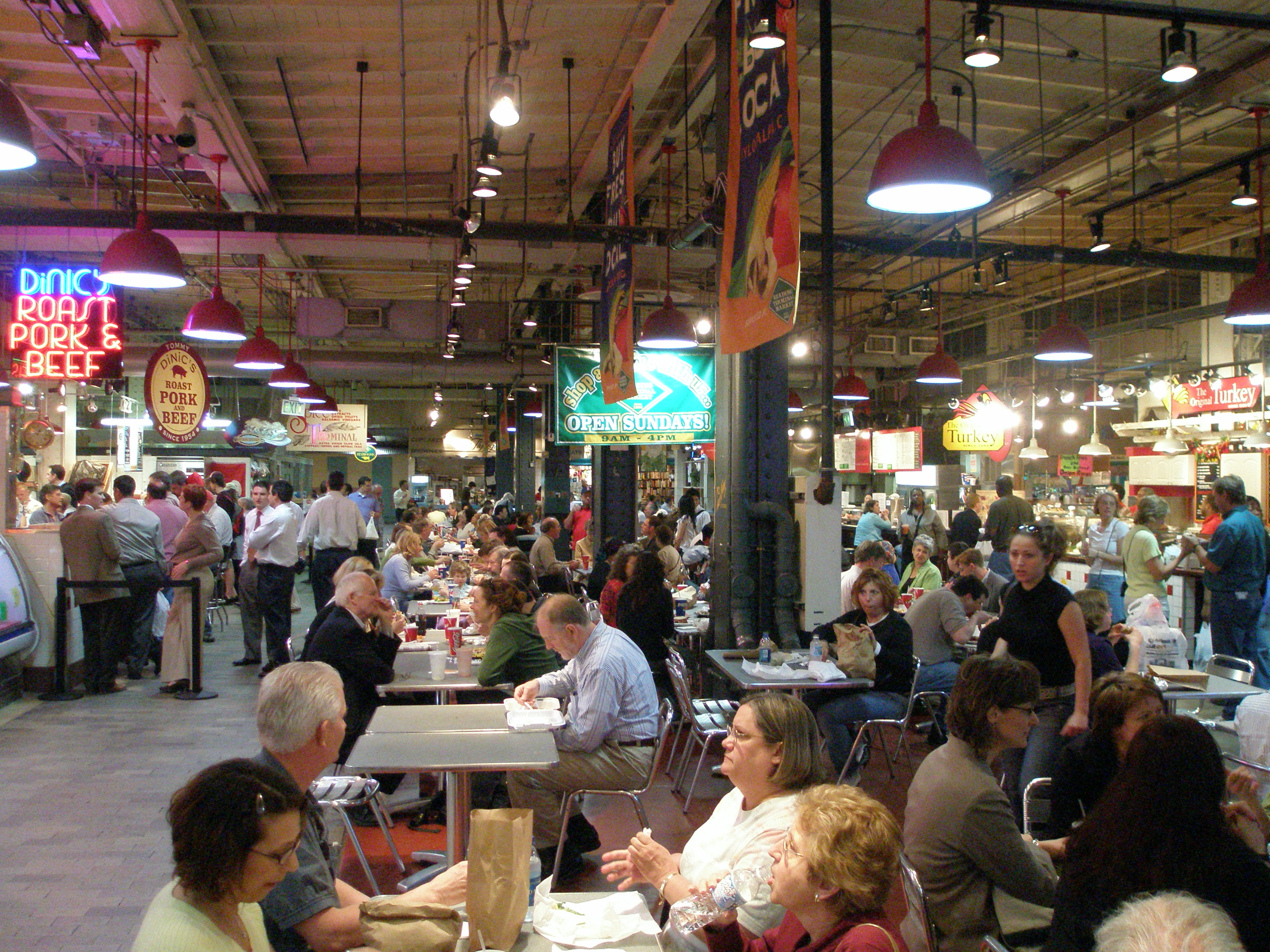
Center Court

Reading Terminal Market is an enclosed public market located at 12th and Arch Streets in Center City Philadelphia, Pennsylvania. It opened originally in 1893 under the elevated train shed of the Reading Railroad Company after the city of Philadelphia advocated to move public markets from the streets into indoor facilities for both safety and sanitary reasons.

When the Center City Commuter Connection was completed in 1984, the Reading Terminal ceased operating as a train station, impacting foot traffic at the Market. The Reading Company then proposed using the Reading Terminal complex as the site for a new convention center. The site was chosen for the convention center, and in 1990 the Company transferred title to the complex to the Pennsylvania Convention Center Authority.

Presently, the Market still occupies the ground floor and basement levels of the Reading Terminal's former train shed which is now part of the Pennsylvania Convention Center. Vendor stalls occupy the ground floor with entrances on Filbert Street to the south, Twelfth Street to the west, and Arch Street to the north. The stalls are arranged in a grid pattern with an open area in the center with tables and seating. Over one hundred merchants offer fresh produce, meats, fish, artisan cheese, groceries, ice cream, flowers, grilled cheese, baked goods, smoothies, crafts, books, clothing, and other specialty items. Two of the vendors are descendants of original merchants from the initial opening in the late 1800s.

The basement floor of the market holds the refrigerated storage area for vendor use. The storage area was considered state-of-the-art when it was built, in 1893. Currently, the market is open every day of the week, although the Pennsylvania Dutch merchants (a small but significant minority) generally do not operate Sundays.

== History ==
=== Origins ===
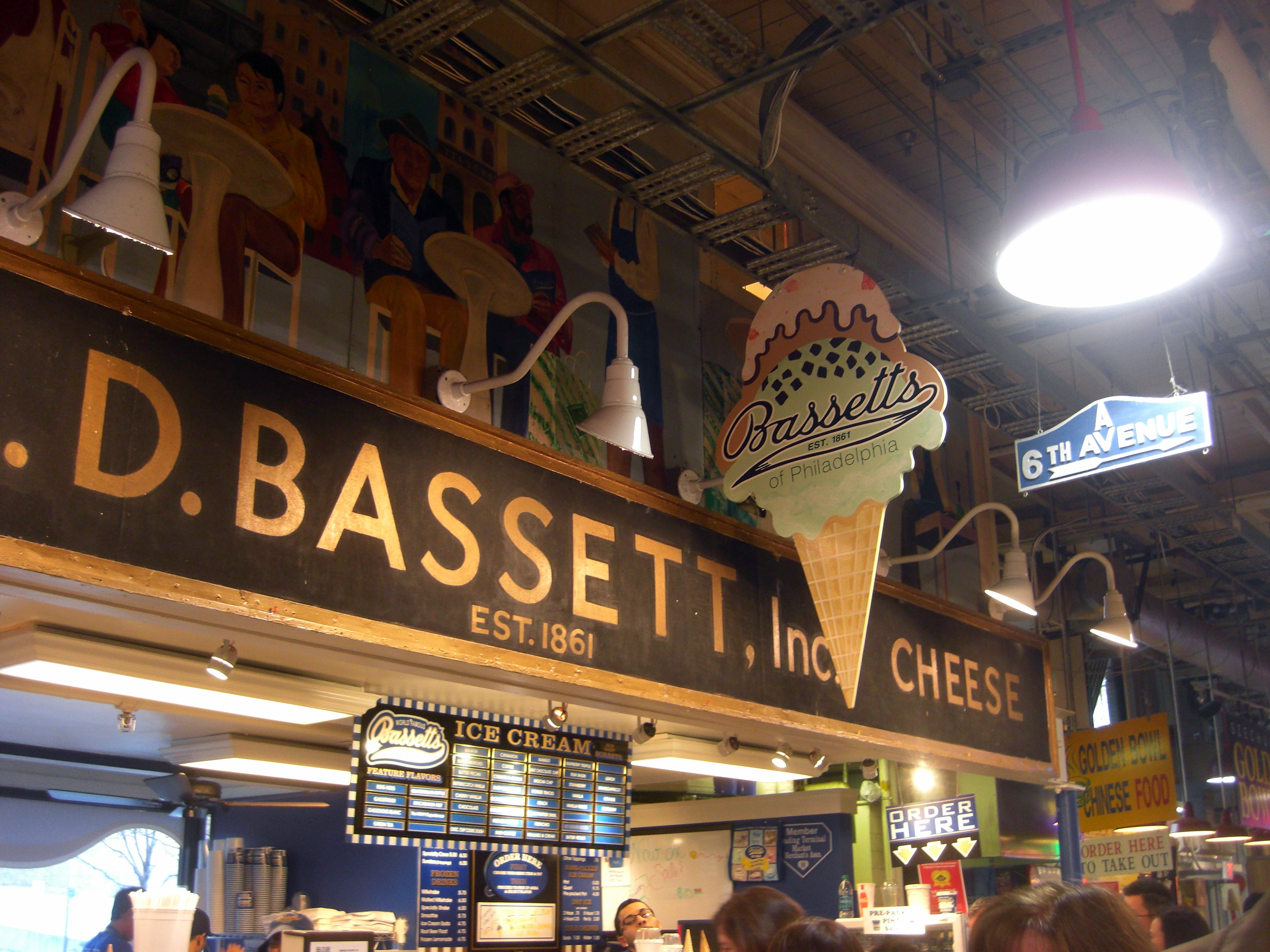
Bassett's Ice Cream at Reading Terminal Market

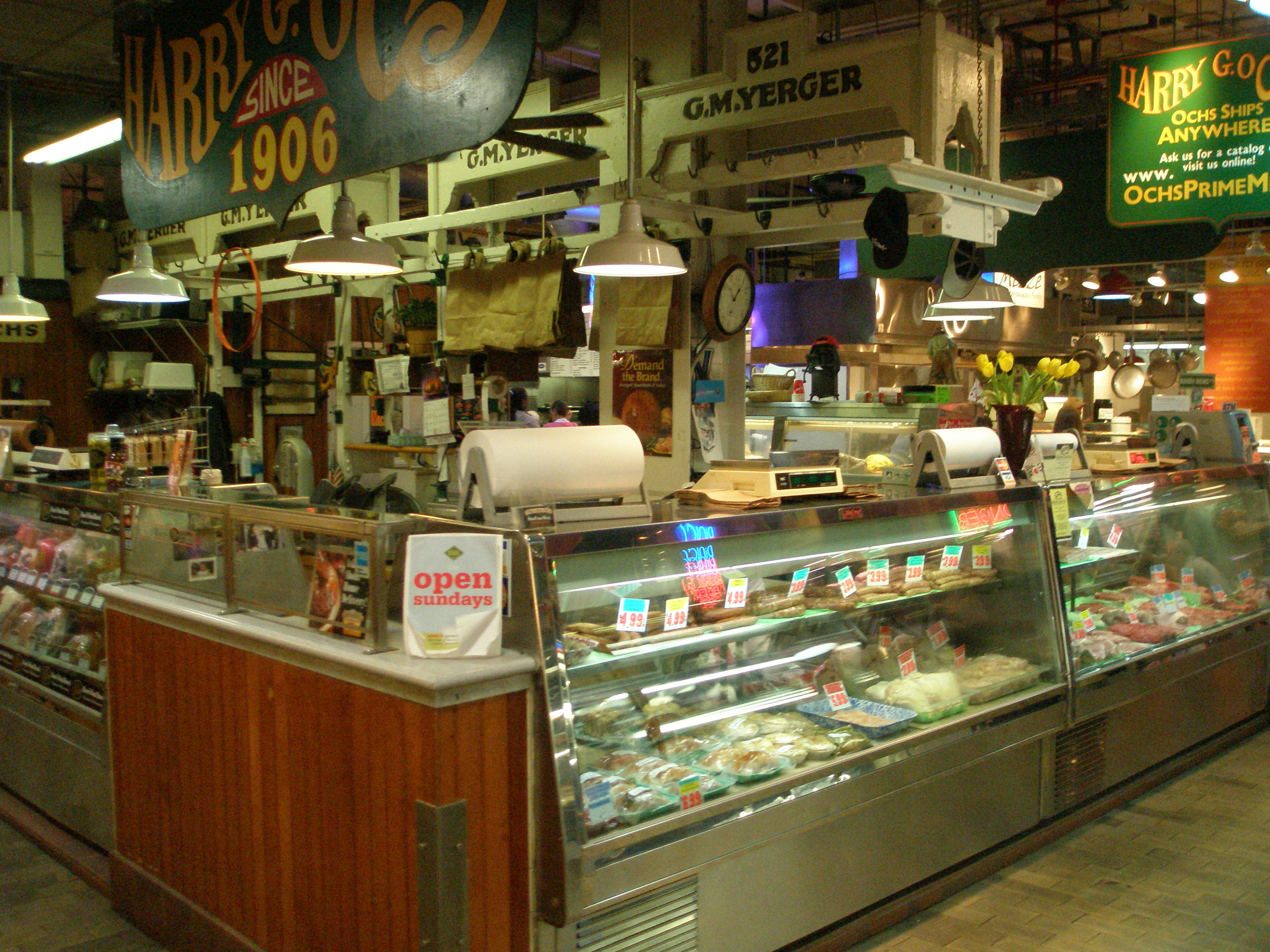
Harry Ochs

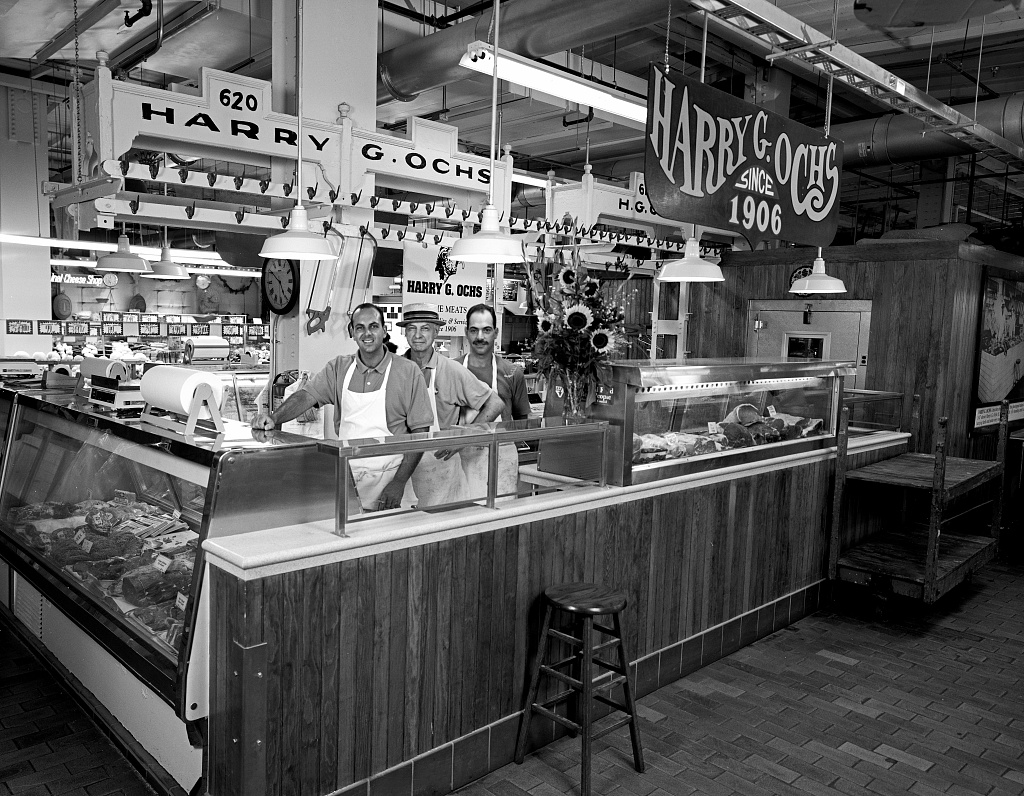
Original Harry Ochs meat stand

Open-air markets have flourished in Philadelphia since its founding. Growth of the city demanded more markets, and the string of open-air markets extending from the Delaware River ran for six blocks, or one full mile, prompting the main street (then called High Street) to be renamed Market Street in 1858. Soon after the markets reached their peak growth and capacity, the public began to perceive open-air markets within the city as dirty and unhygienic. Some residents also considered the frenzy of activity along the High/Market Street as a nuisance and traffic hazard. In 1859, city officials bowed to public pressure and dismantled all of them and the Commonwealth of Pennsylvania chartered seventeen different market companies. This prompted two indoor markets to open at 12th and Market Streets, Franklin Market and Farmers' Market. These two would be the foundation of the Reading Terminal Market.

=== Expansion and growth ===
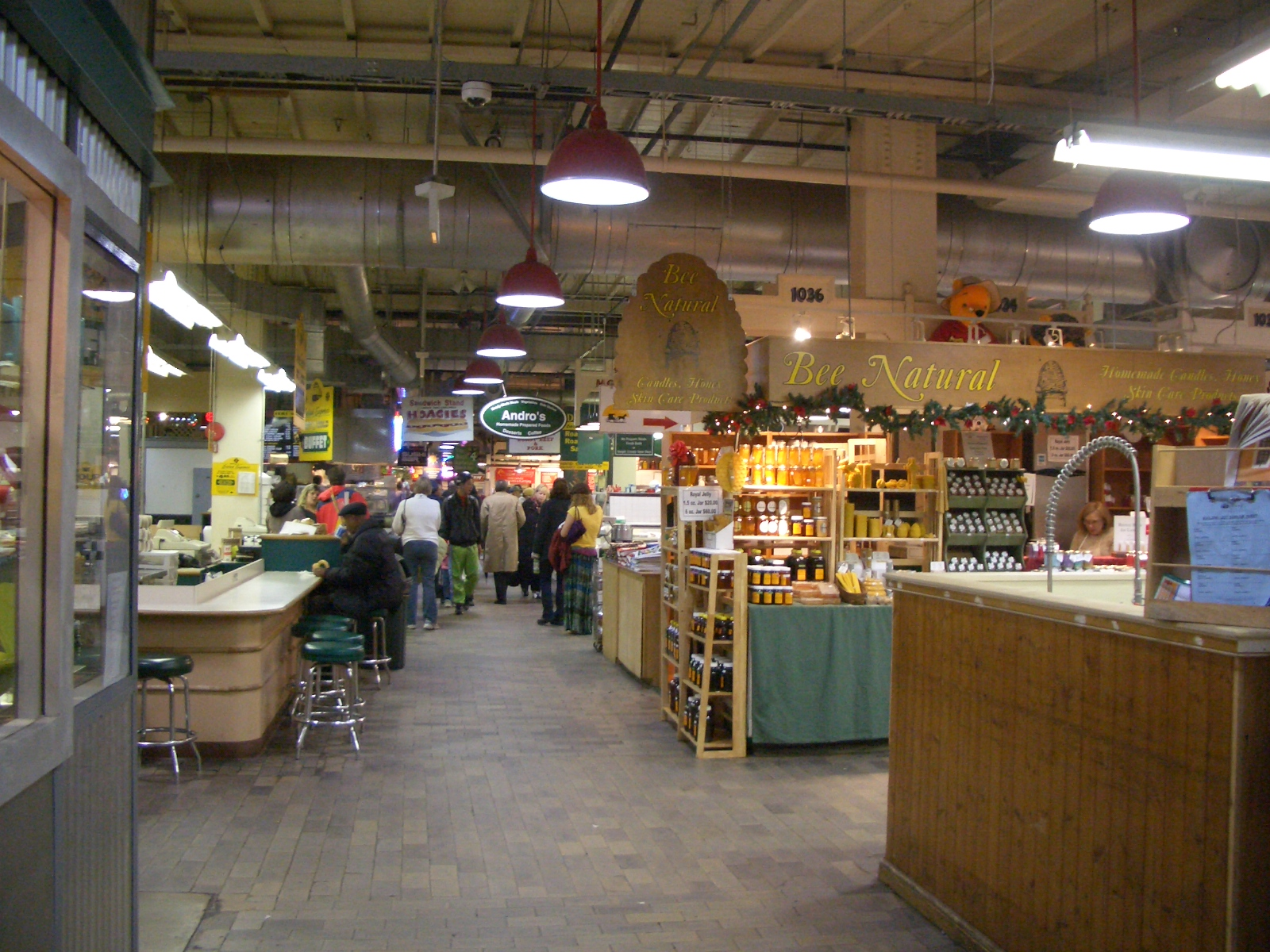
Inside the market

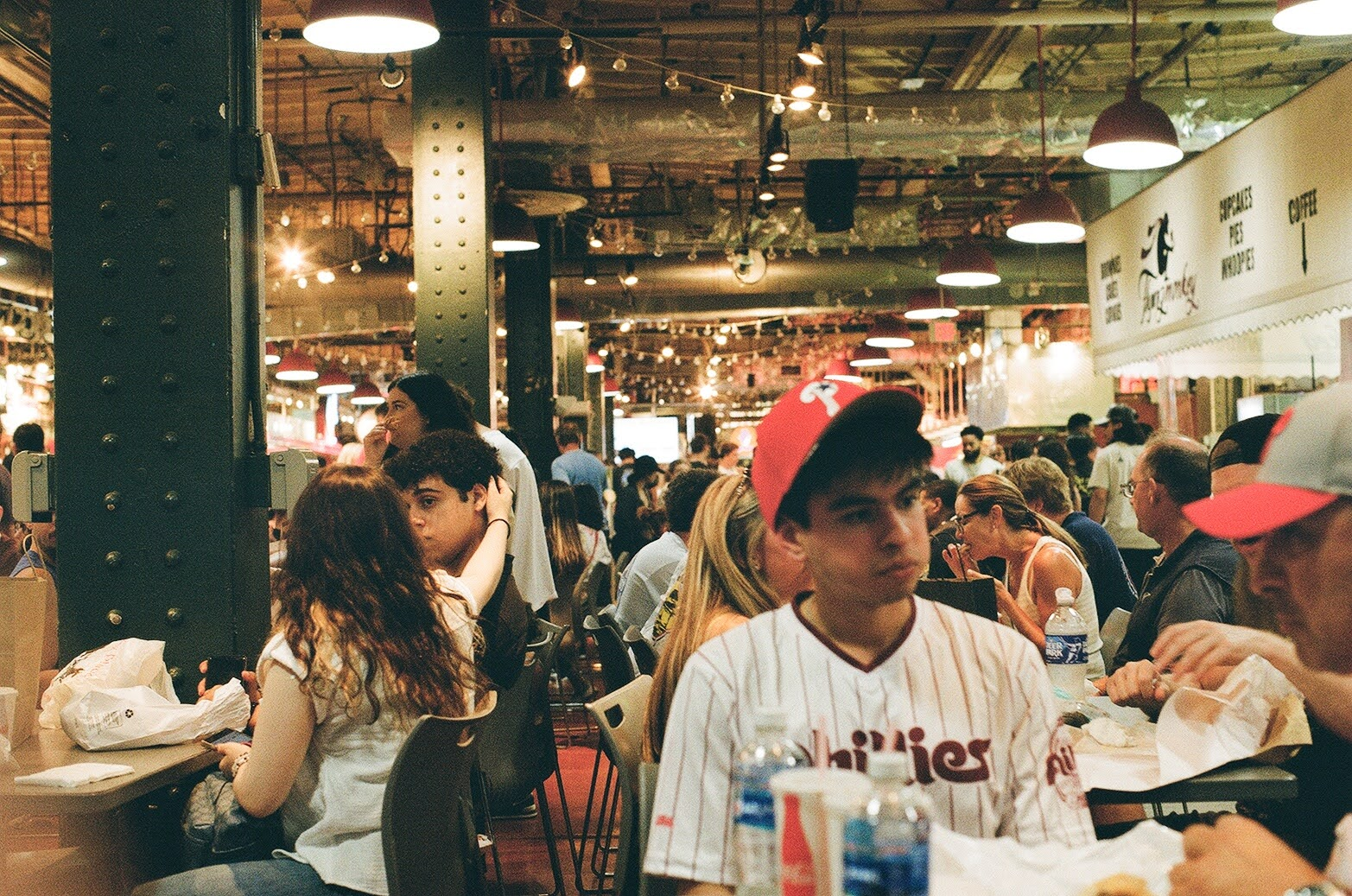
Crowds at the Reading Terminal Market in 2025

The Industrial Revolution brought with it the expansion of the railroad, and great palatial urban terminals sprang up in major cities. Architect F. H. Kimbal of the Wilson Brothers Architecture & Engineering firm designed the Reading Railroad's headhouse terminal in 1891, prior to its opening in 1893. The rails were elevated to reach the train shed platform built over top of the new consolidated market, which opened a year earlier. George McKay was chosen to be the market's first superintendent while the building was undergoing its final phase of construction.

The state-of-the-art refrigerated storage area in the basement opened for use in July 1893. The basement storage area consists of 52 separate rooms ranging in volume from 5,000 to 17,000 ft^{3} (140 to 480 m^{3}) for a total of one-half million cubic feet (14,000 m^{3}) of storage space. The temperature of each room can be controlled individually to meet temperature requirements for different goods: 15 to 25 °F (−9 to −4 °C) for meat and poultry, 34 °F (1 °C) for fruits and vegetables. The refrigeration system uses brine water and ammonia, and includes an array of specially designed pumps, compressors, and other equipment in its operation. The storage area was more expensive to maintain and had a larger staff than the market itself, though refrigerating the basement storage area was thought to be well worth the high cost. It allowed merchants to keep seasonal products in stock all year round for the first time. Third parties also leased the storage area for storing other goods. Restaurants and plant and produce sellers around the area leased out space in the basement. Hospitals used the basement area to store perishable medicine. Local Breweries, including Yuengling, used it to store their hops.

In its first few decades, the Reading Terminal Market was a success. There were 380 merchants in its first year of operations, and the market had nearly full occupancy for the following 60 years. Business, already good, flourished with the innovation of a free market basket service, which allowed suburban housewives to have grocery orders delivered and held at their nearest train station. Refrigerated trucks allowed the market to reach into some 60 suburban towns as well as seaside resorts along the Jersey Shore.

=== Decline ===
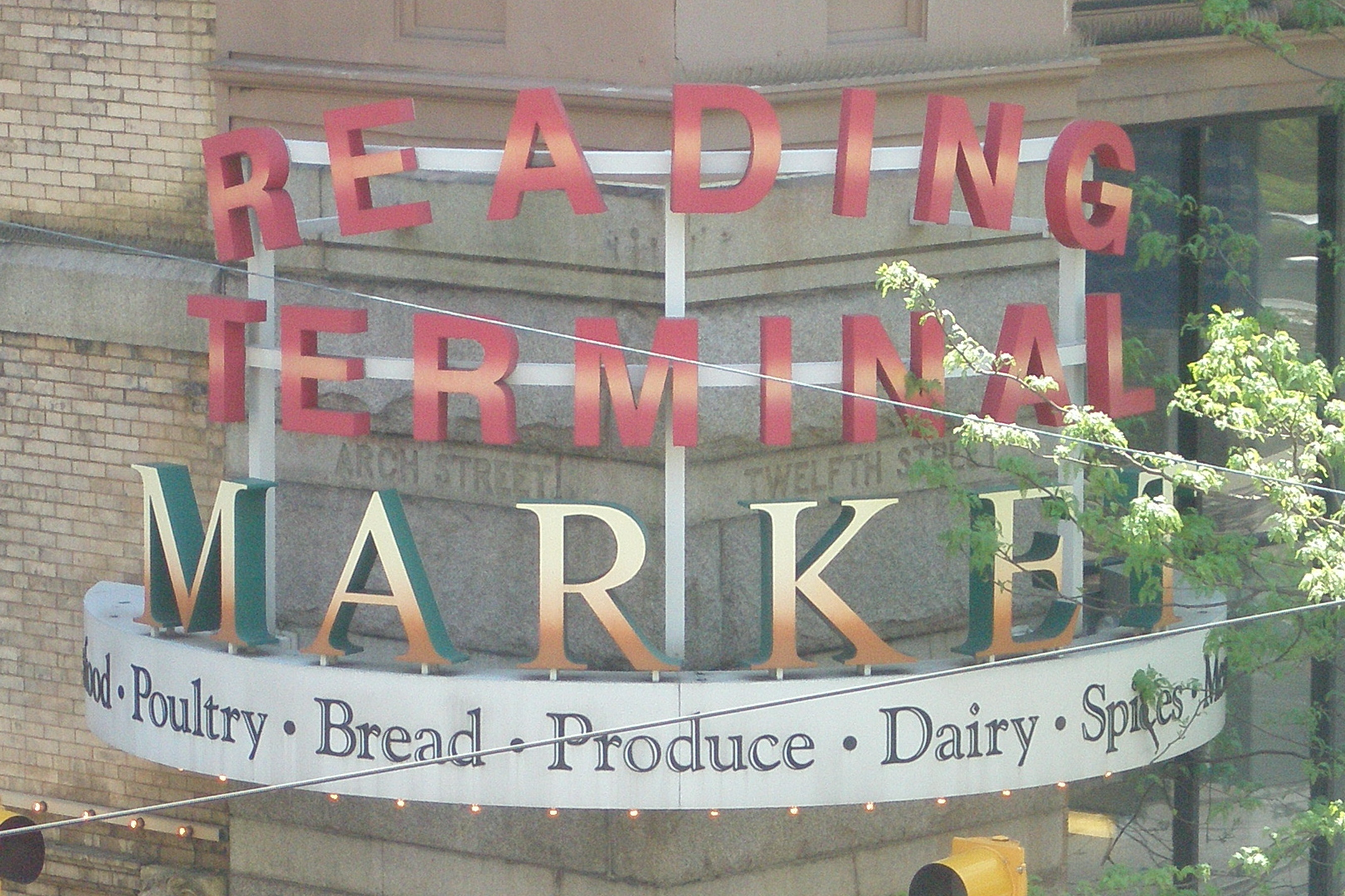
Reading Terminal Market sign

The Great Depression of the 1930s brought hardship to the market. By the late 1930s, merchants were under increasing pressure from the AFL and CIO to join their respective labor unions. This led to a series of strikes that further disrupted business. The introduction and proliferation of supermarkets also hurt market business during the 1930s. One of these new establishments opened across 12th street, directly competing with the Reading Terminal Market. Pressure to compete with supermarkets led to fewer stalls being run by farmers, and more being run by middle men reselling a variety of goods.

Despite the turmoil brought on by the depression and new competition, the Reading Terminal Market remained afloat during the 1930s. By some accounts, the market did rather well. According to George H. Eltien, then superintendent, the market was shipping phone orders to 38 states, Canada, and Mexico throughout the decade. Pressure from supermarkets was not hurting all of the merchants. Ten of the market's 64 merchants had been there since its founding in 1892. In 1930, the Reading Terminal Market Merchants Association was established as an effort to promote and advertise the market and avoid losing any more business. The Association was responsible for several promotional events including the first annual Food Show and Home Progress Exhibitions. It also helped to fund a 1934 renovation of the market's facade that installed new electric lights and window decorations.

America's involvement in World War II during the 1940s affected the Market primarily in a positive way. In 1944, the most economically straining year of the war, the Market was at 97 percent occupancy. Food shortages brought on by the war increased the demand for the market's goods. On May 9, 1946, the Reading Terminal Market experienced its largest recorded crowd. Over 12,000 people gathered at the market to purchase meat, poultry, and pork products that were unavailable elsewhere due to shortages.

The suburbanization of America and decline of the railroads in the 1950s and 1960s severely affected the market. The market began running on a deficit in 1954, and by 1959 was only 70 percent occupied, forcing Reading to raise rents. The state-of-the-art cold storage facility was shut down and dismantled, forcing tenants to supply their own storage. The closure and demolition of the Dock Street wholesale market as part of Society Hill's urban renewal program also impacted many resellers who relied on it for inventory.

The Reading Railroad Company filed for bankruptcy in 1971, and ceased to function as a railroad business in 1976. The company continued to serve mainly as a real estate business, but paid little attention to managing and promoting the market, and pondered ways to get rid of the market so that it would be easier to sell the terminal building.

=== Rebirth ===
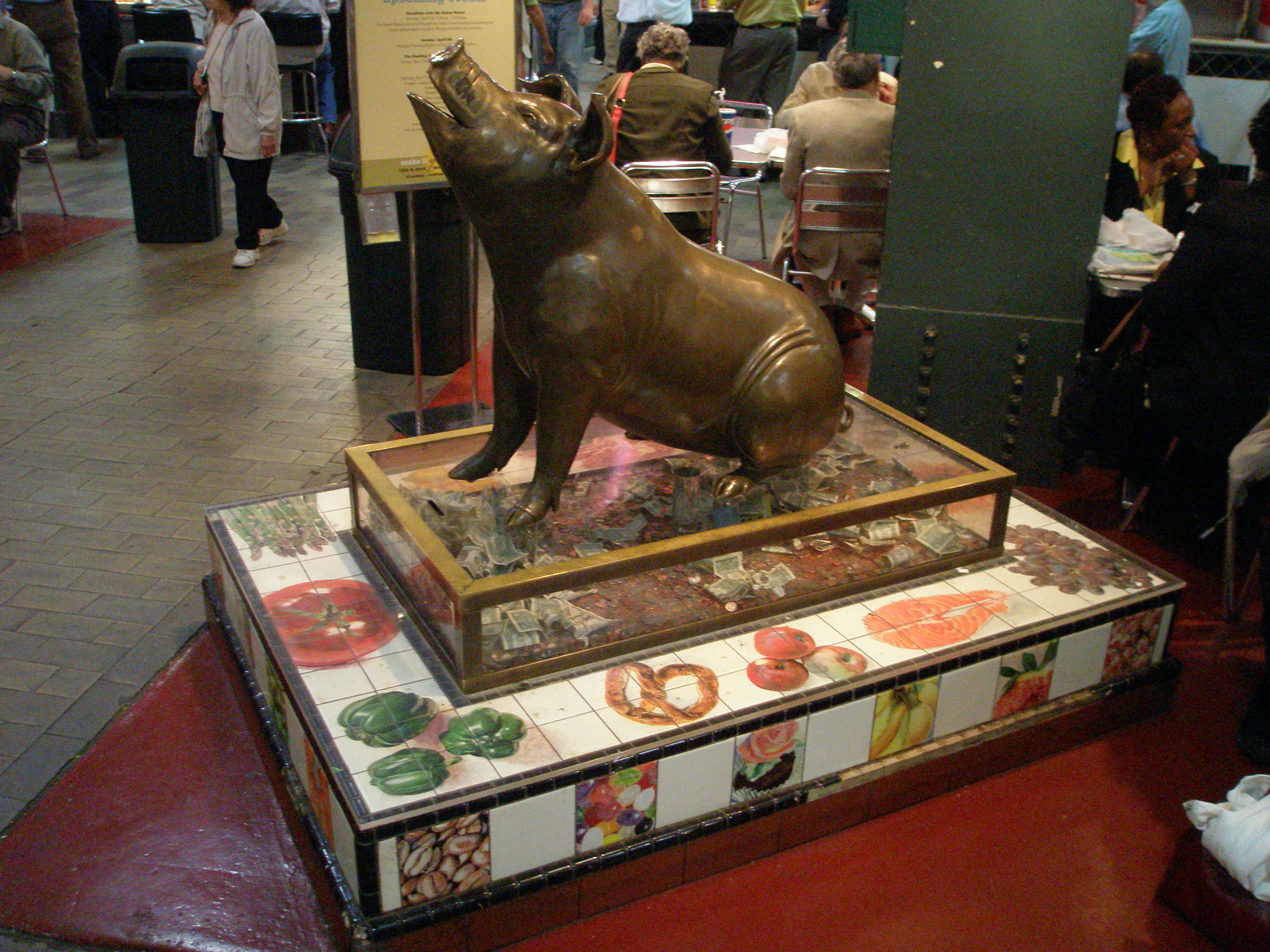
Philbert by Eric Berg

In the 1980s, the Reading Company changed its attitude towards the market and began efforts to revitalize it. Those efforts continued after SEPTA Regional Rail trains moved from the train terminal above the market to the new underground Market East Station (now Jefferson Station) below it in 1984. In 1990, ownership of the Reading Terminal and the market passed to the Pennsylvania Convention Center Authority (PCCA). In 1994, Philadelphia City Council established a new, non-profit Reading Terminal Market Corporation (RTMC) to operate the market.

The RTMC and the PCCA continued the revitalization program begun by the Reading Company, recruiting new tenants and increasing promotion of the market. By the mid-1990s to the 2000s, the market was once again living up to its founders' vision. Over 90% of its leasable space was occupied by profitable and stable vendors. The market is currently open 7 days a week, but not all vendors are open on Sundays. The Pennsylvania Dutch vendors are open Monday through Saturday.

== Today ==
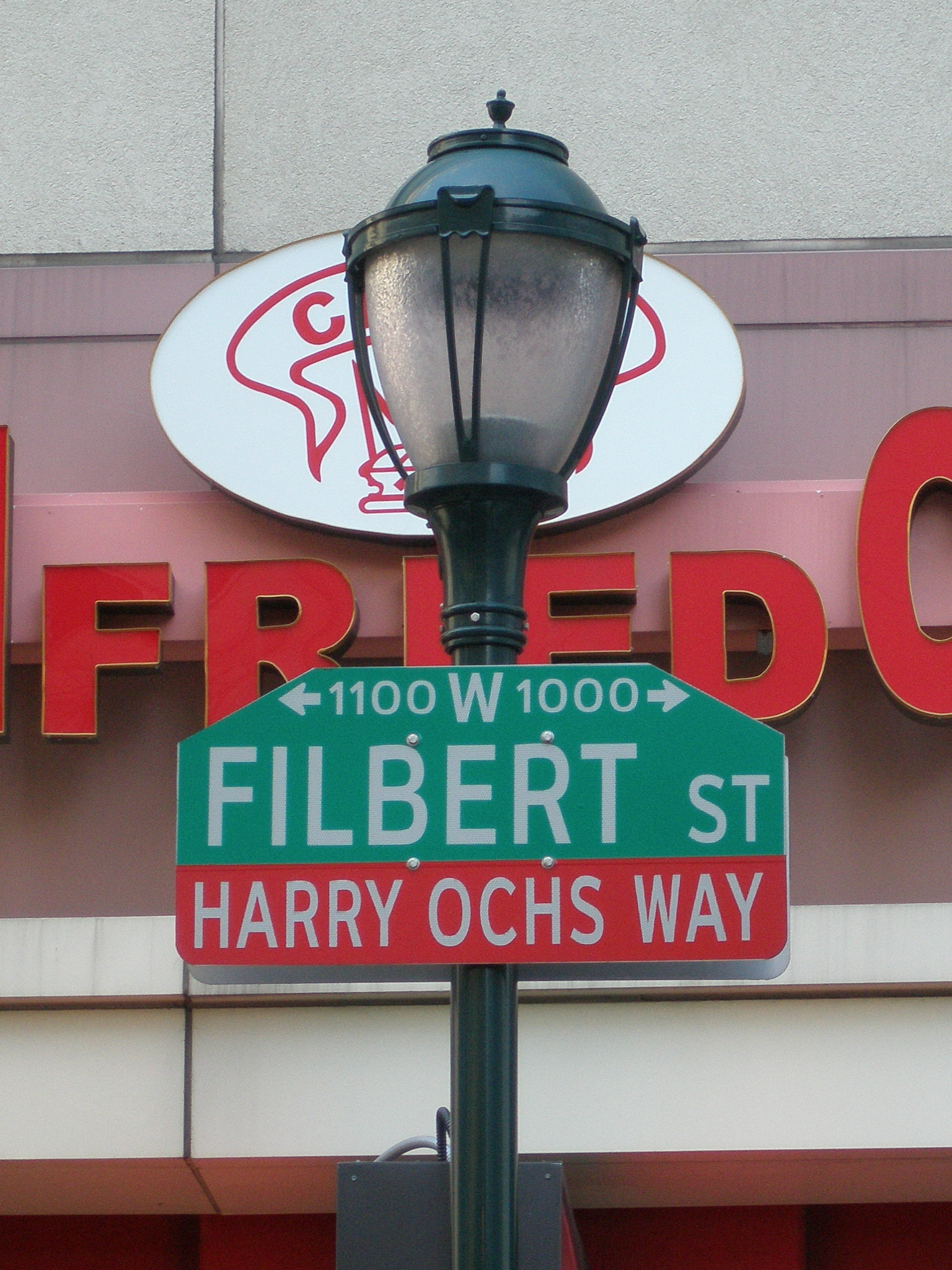
Harry Ochs Way on the 1200 block of Filbert Street

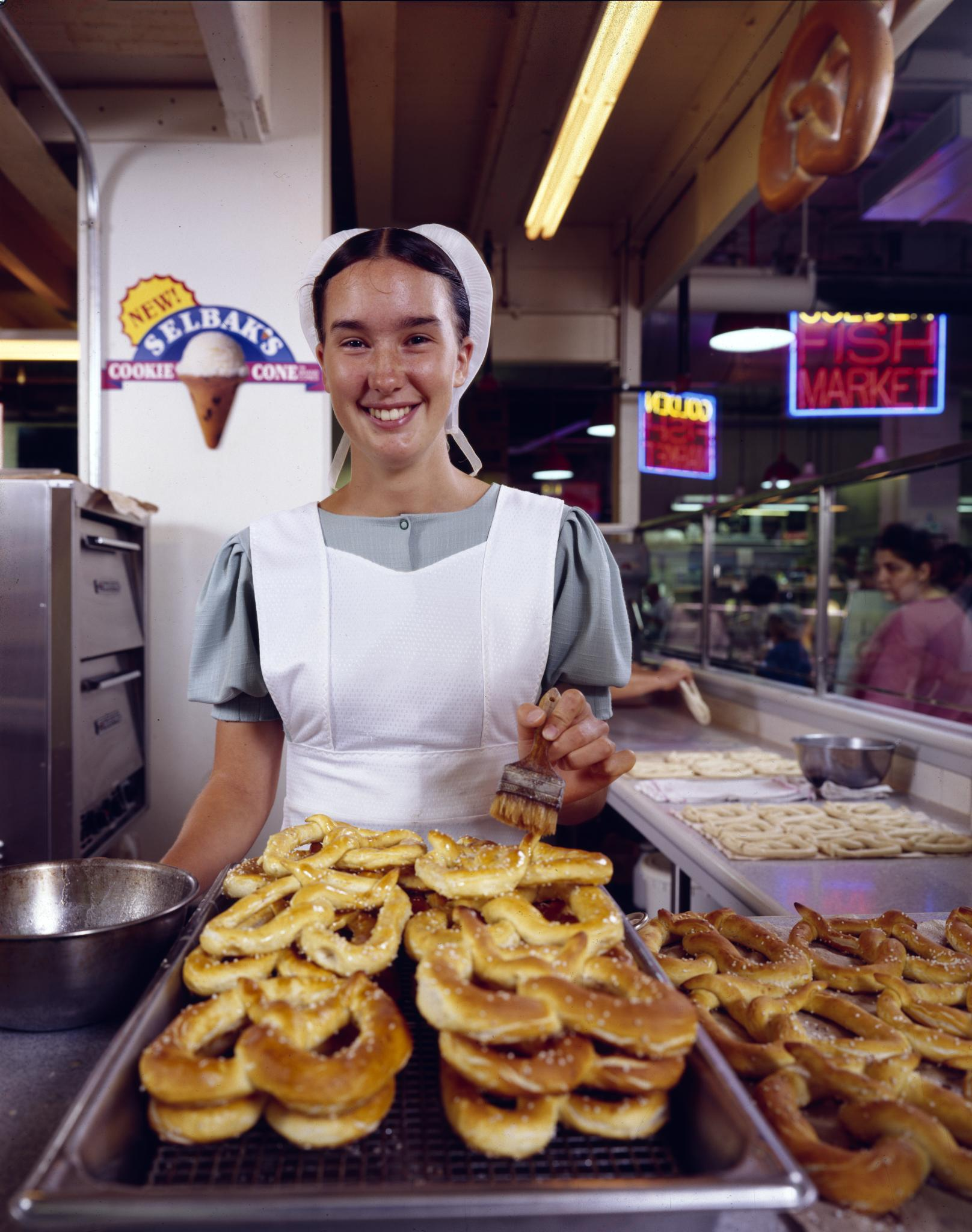
A Pennsylvania Dutch pretzel baker

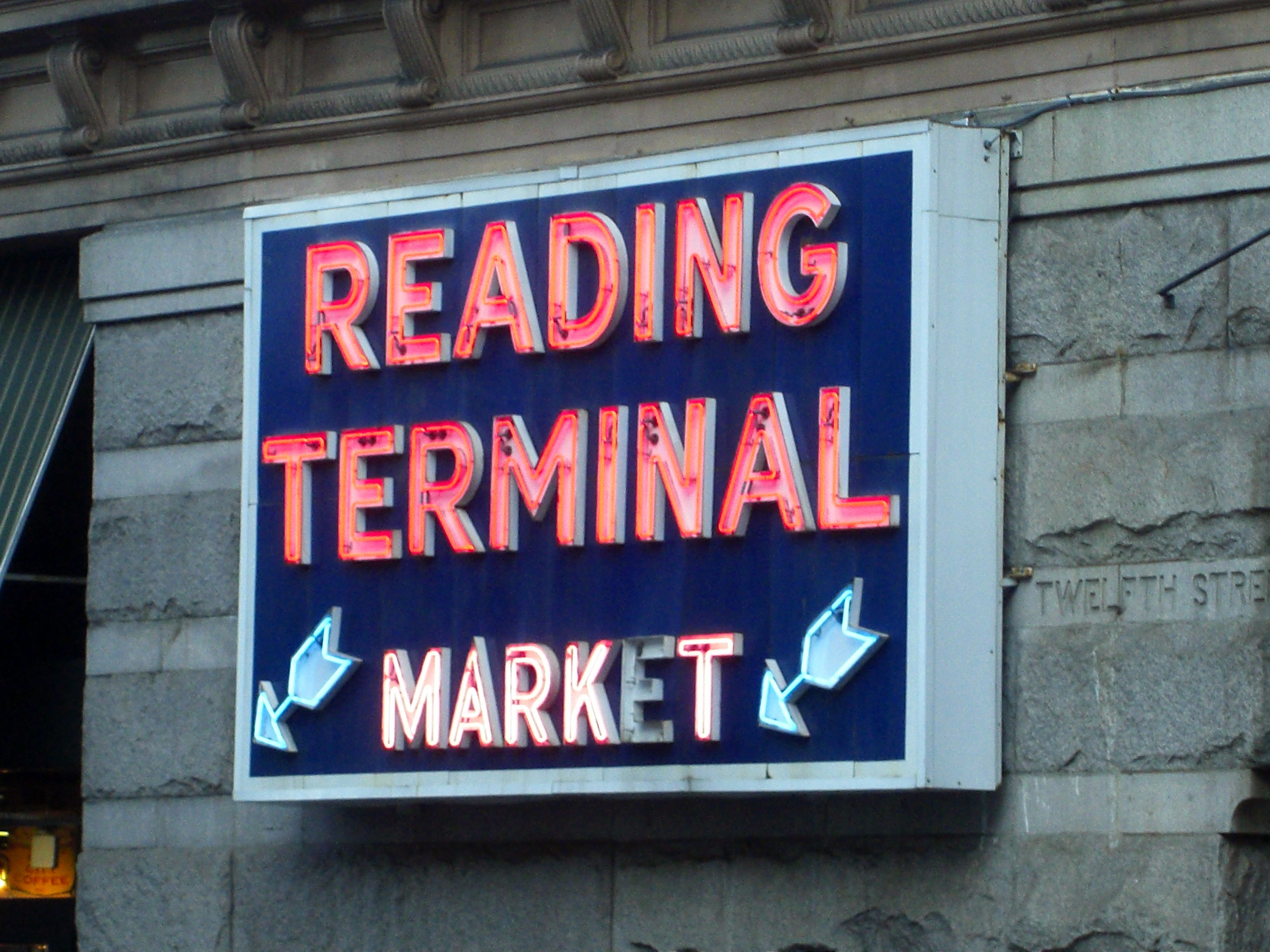
Reading Terminal Market sign

The market serves as a popular location for local residents to buy goods and produce, as well as culinary treats and unique merchandise. At the same time, it is also listed along with such historic Philadelphia tourist destinations as Independence Hall and the Liberty Bell. CEO and general manager Annie Allman extols the market as the place "where tourists come to see Philadelphians in their natural habitat."

The market is adjacent to two Marriott Hotels, a Hilton Garden Inn, the Pennsylvania Convention Center, SEPTA's Jefferson Station, Chinatown, Philadelphia, and another Philadelphia landmark, the Fashion District Philadelphia shopping mall.

As addressed in the Reading Terminal Market's official mission statement, the current organization wants:

- To preserve the architectural and historical character, and function, of the Reading Terminal Market as an urban farmers' market.
- To provide a wide variety of produce, meat, fish, bakery and dairy products, and other raw and prepared food, brought to a public market in the center of the city by farmers, growers, producers and chefs;
- To maintain an environment that recognizes and celebrates the diversity of our citizens and fosters their interaction;
- To strengthen the historic link and mutual dependency of our rural and urban communities; and,
- To achieve this, while preserving the financial viability and achieving self-sufficiency for the Market.

These values illustrate the current goals that the Market community strives for as a collective of service providers.

The present day market has also continued to evolve in terms of the types of merchants that have their businesses in the market; it has shifted from being a place with only produce, delis and fish counters to a more dynamic merchant selection. In addition to longstanding vendors such as Bassett’s Ice Cream—which first signed a lease at Reading Terminal Market in 1893—the market has innovated in recent years, introducing new types of vendors and experimenting with pop-up food carts. In addition to mainstays such as butchers and fishmongers, the market is home to the non-profit Fair Food Philly’s market stand, a gourmet corn-dog vendor, a winery, and a beer hall. Day-carts—which have typically housed the wares of souvenir sellers and arts and crafts vendors—now may sell foods and beverages. One of the newest vendors to operate a day-cart is a craft distiller of spirits.

Besides the up-and-coming vendors that have made themselves a part of Reading Terminal Market, a variety of events have come out of the continued development of the market. Some of these events include a "beer-tasting extravaganza", “Breaking Bread, Breaking Barriers: Food as a Bridge to Cultural Understanding” series and a community gathering benefiting local Syrian refugees who are getting to know their neighborhood.

== References in popular culture ==
Philbert the pig, a sculpture by Eric Berg, is the Market's mascot and donations made to this 'piggy bank' go to support healthy eating programs at The Food Trust.

The market has been a filming location for several major motion pictures including Trading Places and National Treasure. More specifically, one of the market's stands, Tommy DiNic's Beef and Pork, was featured on the Travel Channel show Man v. Food as well as Adam Richman's Best Sandwich in America. Mueller Chocolate Co. was featured on Guilty Pleasures on the Food Network, as well as on Bizarre Foods with Andrew Zimmern.

== See also ==
- Market East, Philadelphia, Pennsylvania
