= Food rescue =

Recovery and donation of wasted edible food

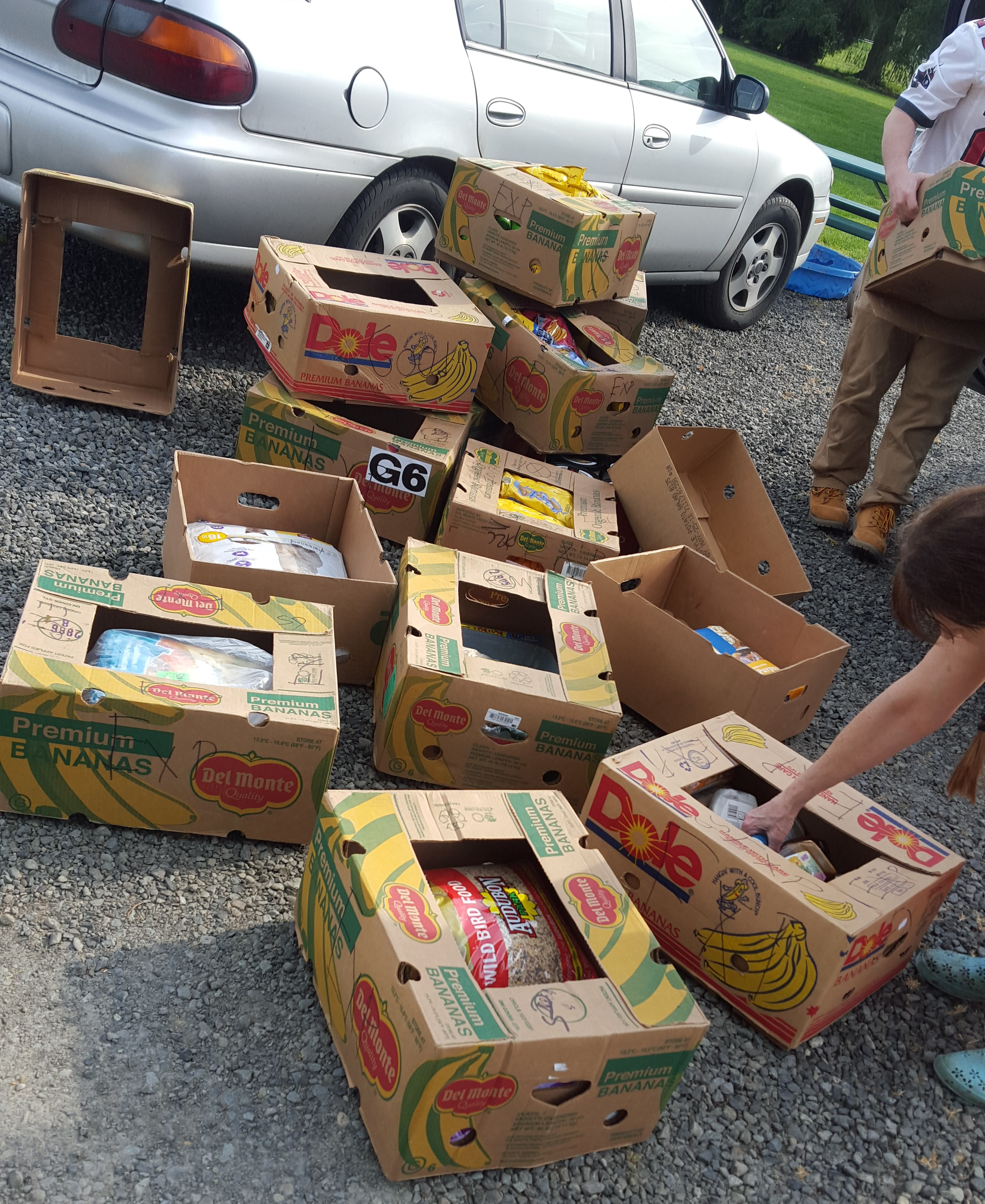
Food rescued from being thrown away

Food rescue, also called food recovery, food salvage or surplus food redistribution, is the practice of gleaning edible food that would otherwise go to waste from places such as farms, produce markets, grocery stores, restaurants, or dining facilities and distributing it to local emergency food programs.

In 2022, the UN reported 1.05 billion tons of food were wasted. At the retail, food service, and household level, about 19% of food available to consumers was wasted, and around 13% of the world's total available food was lost in the supply chain. Meanwhile, it was reported that about one in eleven people globally faced hunger (around 733 million).

The recovered food is edible, but often not sellable. In the case of fresh produce, fruits and vegetables that do not meet cosmetic standards for shape and color might otherwise be discarded. Products that are at or past their "sell by" dates or are imperfect in any way such as a bruised apple or day-old bread are donated by grocery stores, food vendors, restaurants, and farmers markets. Other times, the food is unblemished, but restaurants may have made or ordered too much or may have good pieces of food (such as scraps of fish or meat) that are byproducts of the process of preparing foods to cook and serve. Also, food manufacturers may donate products that marginally fail quality control, or that have become short-dated. In many cases, products that have reached a "best before" or "sell by" date may still be usable. What dates mean varies in different countries.

Organizations that encourage food recovery, food rescue, sharing, gleaning and similar waste-avoidance schemes often work with food banks, food pantries, soup kitchens and shelters to redistribute food. Food rescue operations need to keep food safe during storage and transportation. They also need to share information quickly to ensure that near-perishable foods can be moved to where they can be used. Apps that match end-of-day produce with customers and charitable organizations are increasingly being used.

As well as addressing food insecurity, food rescue decreases the production of greenhouse gases in landfills and is an important step in helping cities to become carbon neutral. In recent years, the EU has taken considerable action to combat food loss and waste as part of their Sustainable Development Goals. In 2016, France required supermarkets to donate their unsold food rather than throwing it away. In October 2021, the city of Milan, Italy, won the Earthshot Prize for a citywide project to redistribute surplus food from supermarkets, restaurants and companies. In 2023, Brussels, Belgium, has begun work on improving the labeling system for "best before" and "use by" dates to help reduce the amount of food that is still safe to consume from being thrown out by consumers.

== The food system ==
External videos
- Food Waste causes Climate Change. Here's how we stop it. , March 27, 2020

In most cases, rescued food is being saved from being thrown into a dumpster and, ultimately, landfills or other garbage disposals. Food recovered on farms is kept from being plowed under. On farms, the donations often must be harvested, or gleaned, by volunteers.

In the United States, businesses that donate food to nonprofits, such as food rescue programs, have received tax benefits for their donations and have been protected from liability lawsuits by the federal Emerson Good Samaritan Food Donation Act since 1996. In 2016 the USDA expanded the Farm Storage Facility Loan Program, which provides farmers with low-interest loans to upgrade or expand their storage facilities, thus enabling them protect more food from becoming waste.

The benefit of many food rescue programs is they offer healthy food to those in need, such as individuals living in a food desert, a region where its residents lack access to healthy and affordable foods due to poor retail access and other social and urban factors. Food rescue programs also benefit those who may not meet the application requirements of state food-assistance programs. Many programs also provide immediate emergency assistance, without having to wait through an application process. Food rescue organizations are less restricted by cost and availability of food, as so much edible food is thrown out and free for the taking, so eligibility requirements are generally unnecessary. This organizational model often allows food rescues to provide nutritional assistance more quickly, with more flexibility and accessibility than other types of hunger relief programs.

== Greenhouse gas emissions ==
According to the UN's Food and Agriculture Organization, food waste is the third-largest source of greenhouse gas emissions. 98% of food waste ends up in landfills, where they decompose and release methane gas into the atmosphere. Because food waste decays more quickly, food waste contributes more methane emissions than anything else that goes to landfills. Methane gas is over 20 times more potent than carbon dioxide in affecting climate change. Wasted food in landfills accounts for 8-10% of global greenhouse gas emissions. Greenhouse gasses from rotting foods contribute to warmer global temperatures and extreme weather events, sea level rise, as well as ozone depletion and increased risk of diseases.

Food rescue helps fight greenhouse gas emissions from landfills. Every US dollar spent on rescuing food from going to the landfill or compost saves roughly 7.5 kilograms of greenhouse gas emissions.

Between August 2016 and July 2017, Aria, a major resort and convention center in Las Vegas, Nevada, collaborated with Three Square Food Bank to launch a food rescue program, rescuing over 24,000 kilograms worth of surplus food from large gatherings. The program provided over 45,000 meals to individuals experiencing food insecurity, as well as preventing approximately 108 metric tons of greenhouse gas emissions from releasing into the atmosphere, the equivalent of 250 barrels of oil consumed.

== Food waste hierarchy ==
The food waste hierarchy is a guideline of waste reduction strategies ranked from most to least favorable. The five tiers on the pyramid, from most favorable to least, include prevention/reduction, reuse, recycle, recovery and disposal.

== Food reuse strategies ==
There are various ways to rescue food that would otherwise go to a landfill, as described in the priority levels of the waste hierarchy above. The United States Environmental Protection Agency recommends actions such as (in order of preference): source reduction, feeding hungry people, feeding animals, industrial use, and composting, all of which are preferred to the least desirable options, incineration and landfill.

=== Source reduction ===
Reduce the amount of food that is generated and potentially wasted. At an individual level, food waste results from choices made during the planning, shopping, storing, preparing, cooking, eating, and discarding of food. Individuals can for example make shopping lists so they do not buy more food than they really need, to reduce food waste at the household level. They can also buy smaller amounts of produce more frequently, to avoid spoilage at home. Studies of food waste behaviors suggest that another reason that people waste food is misconceptions about date labeling, so learning about food labels can help to reduce waste. A useful tactic is to use visual prompts such as brightly colored tape to mark foods that need to be used soon. Reminders that cue people about what to use can be particularly helpful in large households.

Source reduction is often advocated at all stages of the food supply chain, and could be achieved via Prevention and valorisation pathways for human consumption, such as food donations, or upcycling and re-processing into new food products. This can also include measures to overcome current hinders that limits the food potential per produced unit of food, such as unharvested "ugly" vegetables at farms, "best-before" dates at retail level, or under utilized by-products from food processing. Via source reduction, by either recovering food resources for human consumption or preventing waste generation, the food potential can be increased. A higher food potential can support self-sustainability and self-sufficiency, which in turn can infer both environmental, economic and social benefits.

The Flashfood app, designed by Josh Domingues, is being used in Canada and the United States to keep edible food from becoming waste. It notifies users of deeply discounted groceries, encouraging shoppers to buy soon-to-be-remaindered foods. They can make their purchase online, then go by the store to pick up their food. Initially focusing on restaurants and bakeries, the Too Good to Go app enables customers to buy discounted Surprise Bags of food. Too Good to Go was first used in Denmark in 2015 and was in use in 15 countries as of 2022.

=== Human consumption ===
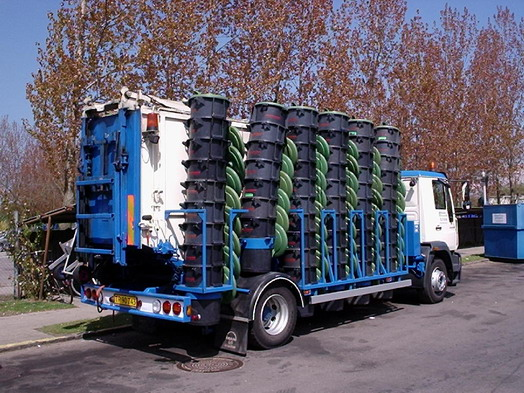
A food-waste collection truck fills approximately 40 bins with food waste collected from large kitchens. This food will later be turned into nourishment pills for pigs.

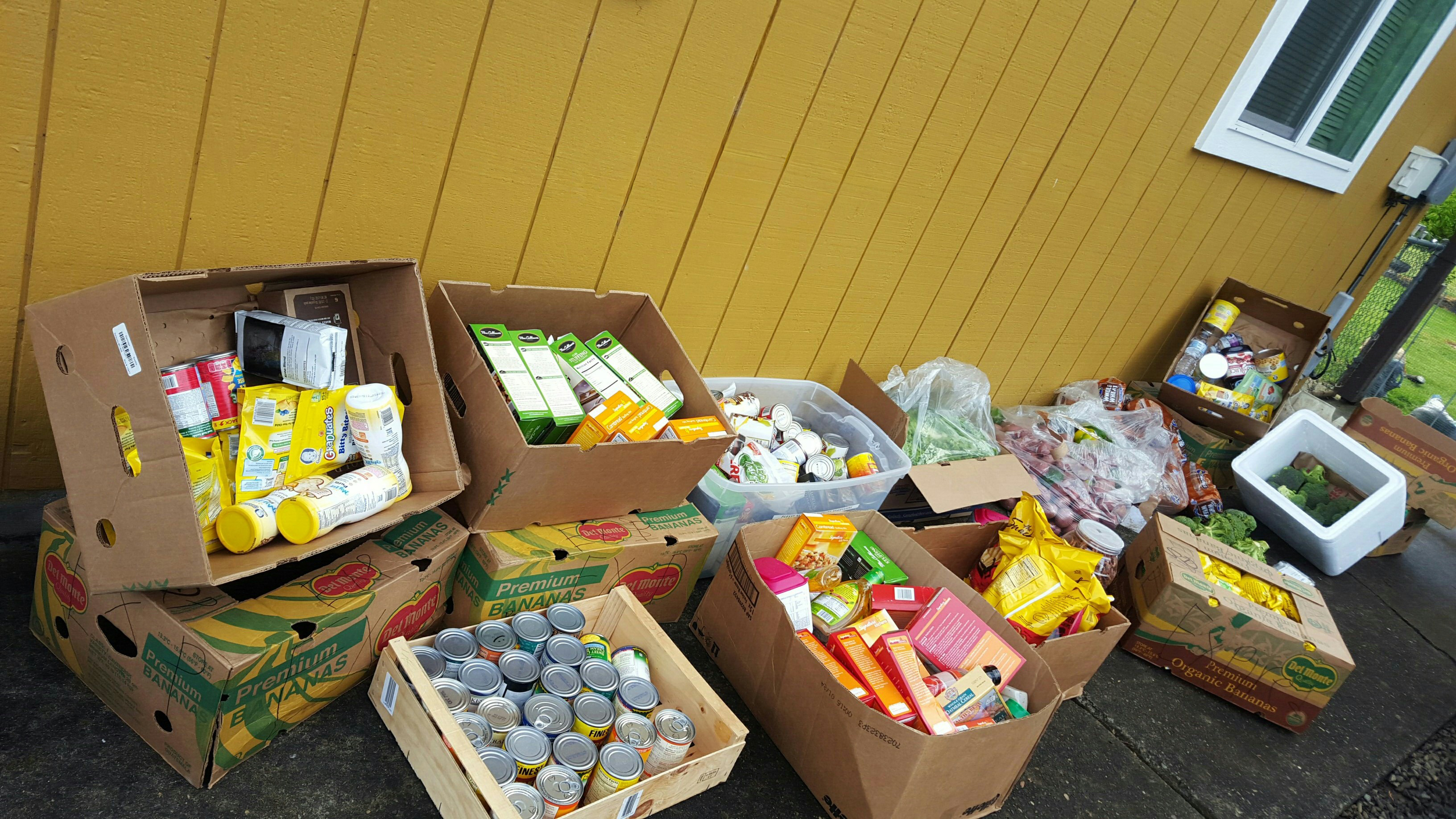
Food with no expiration dates but just past the 'best by' date by a couple months rescued from going to landfill and distributed to people who needed and wanted it

Organizations can donate both non-perishable and unspoiled perishable food at the end of its shelf life to food banks, food pantries, food rescue programs, homeless shelters, and other organizations that redistribute food.

Individuals who practice food rescue are sometimes referred to as freegans or dumpster divers.

=== Feeding animals ===
Many animals, particularly livestock, can eat food scraps. However, with animals, as with humans, spoiled or contaminated foods may cause illness. As described in Virginia State University's standard for animal care: "Food must be fresh, palatable, uncontaminated with biological or chemical agents, and nutritionally adequate for the intended species." Some farmers, solid waste collectors and recycling centers collect discarded food for use by animals. Local laws for the collection and use of such foods will vary.

=== Industrial uses ===
Anaerobic digestion is a conversion process that converts food waste and other types of organic waste into renewable energy. Food is separated from any packaging before being broken down into a more digestible state and mixed with bacteria in oxygen free holding tanks known as digesters. The bacteria work to break down the waste converting it into methane biogas which can be used to generate electricity.

Hydrothermal liquefaction is the process of heating food waste under high pressure, converting the food waste into an oil that can then be refined into fuel. Once the initial liquefaction is complete, the watery waste left over then goes through anaerobic digestion where the microbes break down the waste into methane and carbon dioxide biogas. This biogas can be used for heat and electricity.

It is also possible to use fats, oils, grease, and meat products for rendering and biodiesel production.

=== Composting ===
Add remaining food waste to an existing compost. Composting has many benefits over general waste landfills, including reduced methane gas production and improving the quality of the soil.

== Countries ==
Organizations in communities around the world, and national and international agencies, are concerned with rescuing food, minimizing food waster, and preventing the release of greenhouse gases from decomposing wastes. The 2015 Sustainable Development Goals (SDGs) call for a 50% reduction of global food waste at the retail and consumer levels worldwide by 2030.

=== Australia ===
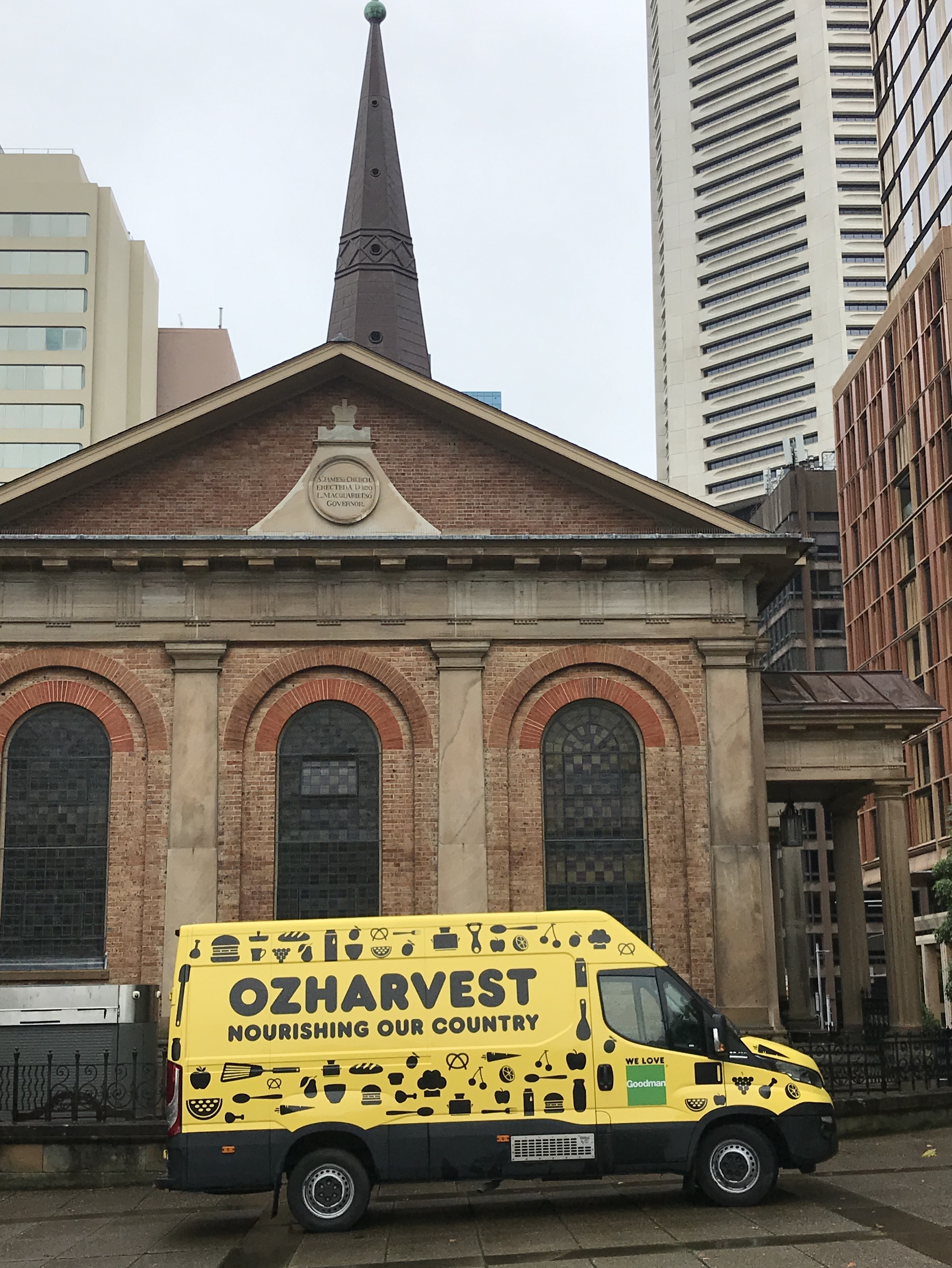
OzHarvest truck making a routine food delivery to St. James' Church, Sydney, to be given to people in need of it

As of 2022 an estimated one in six Australians experiences food insecurity. Australia was the first country to adopt the Sustainable Development Goal of a 50% reduction in food waste, with the Australian government providing some support for food rescue initiatives. Australia's leading food rescue organization is OzHarvest. OzHarvest works with over 3,000 food donors and 1,800 charities in Australia and has provided over 210 million meals. Locations can be found using its online resource locator.

OzHarvest was launched in November 2004 by Ronni Kahn. As an event manager in the hospitality industry, Kahn had first-hand experience of the amounts of food being wasted at events. In addition to founding and directing OzHarvest, Kahn organized lobbying of the Australian government. In July 2005, Australia's Civil Liability Act was changed to enable OzHarvest and other organizations to repurpose food for charitable purposes without risk of liability.

=== Canada ===
External videos
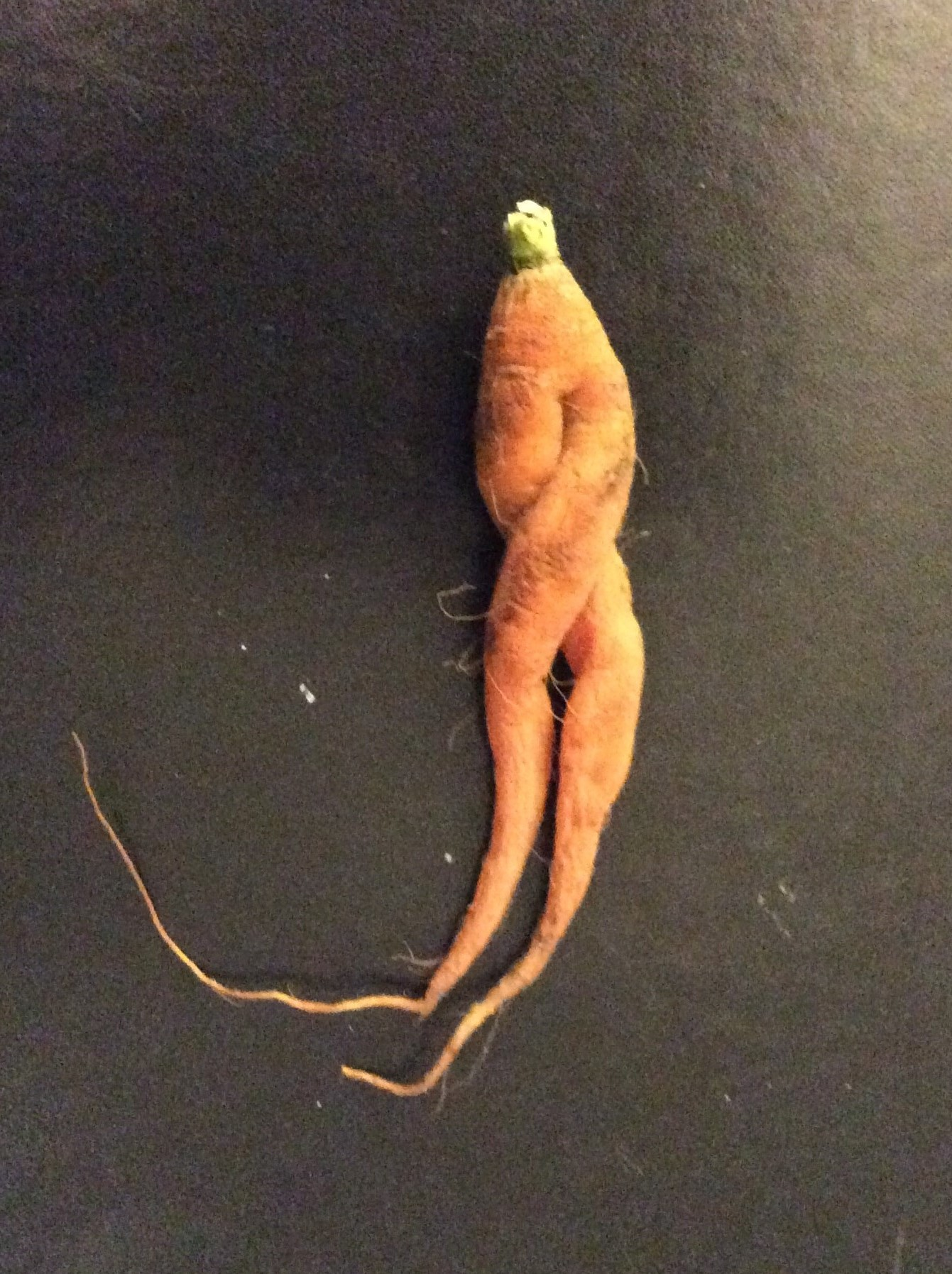
- Canadians get creative in solving food waste problem , CBC News, Aug 29, 2018

Food Banks Canada is a national charitable organization for food banks across Canada. In 2017, one in eight families (12.5%) in Canada were reported to be short of food. As of June 2022, Food Banks Canada researchers found that one in five Canadians (20%) reported going hungry. University students in Canada are a particularly high risk group for food insecurity. Meal Exchange, a Canadian charity, surveyed students at 13 Canadian universities. They reported that 56.8% of the 6,167 students surveyed in October 2021 experienced food insecurity, compared to 41.7% of respondents in 2020. Indigenous, LGBTQ+ and international students were even more likely to be in need of food.

Second Harvest Toronto was started in Toronto, Canada, in 1985 by Ina Andre and Joan Clayton. They began working with restaurants, then moved up the supply chain to distribution centres, gathering donations that would have been landfilled before reaching grocery stores or restaurants. Second Harvest has developed partnerships with companies such as Canada's largest food retailer, Loblaw's. Loblaw has donated over 1.5 million pounds of surplus food. Harvest Kitchens use donated food to prepare meals, which are then taken and redistributed to programs that serve seniors, the homeless, children, and others. Some Harvest Kitchens train volunteers in food service skills that they can then use to find work. Second Harvest supplies food to children and youth at summer camps through its Feeding Our Future program. In 2022, reflecting the impact of the COVID-19 pandemic, the charity received requests for food for 6,000 children compared to the previous summer's 2,000 children, with demand outstripping supply. The Second Harvest Food Rescue App is used to connect businesses with surplus food directly to local nonprofits. The current CEO of Second Harvest Toronto is Lori Nikkel.

Leftovers was started by Lourdes Juan in Calgary, Alberta, in 2012, and has expanded to Edmonton and Hinton, Alberta, and Winnipeg, Manitoba. By providing higher nutritional quality food, food rescue programs like LeftOvers can improve people's health.

In Squamish, British Columbia, the Squamish Helping Hands Society works to combat homelessness through Under One Roof, a community centre with both supportive housing and food programs. It was developed in cooperation with the District of Squamish, BC Housing, Helping Hands, Vancouver Coastal Health, and the Food Bank. The Market and kitchen at Under One Roof receive donations of rescued food and provide food to the community for free or what the buyer can afford. The food hub of the building is planned to generate zero waste. Maureen Mackell became executive director of Squamish Helping Hands in 2010.

=== China ===
China's first food bank, the Green Food Bank in Shanghai, was launched In 2014. The food bank collects food that would be wasted and redistributes it to those in need. A recent initiative is an online marketplace where items are priced at RMB0.01, less than a US cent. People can shop privately from their homes, but are asked to provide government-issued documentation to verify that those using the system are in need (low income, disabled, etc.).

=== France ===
The French government has introduced national legislation to cut down on food waste. As of 2012, private sector companies producing more than 120 tons of organic waste per year were required to recycle it. Subsequent legislation requires recycling by all businesses producing at least 10 tons of organic waste per year. In 2016 France required supermarkets to donate their unsold food rather than throw it away.

=== Guatemala ===
About 8% of the population of Latin America identify as Indigenous peoples. They are nearly three times as likely to live in extreme poverty than non-Indigenous people. In Guatemala, the food bank Desarrollo en Movimiento (DEM) partners with community organizations throughout the country, including communities that are predominantly Indigenous like the K’iche’ or Qʼeqchiʼ. The food bank has recognized that it needs to train its personnel and adapt its services to what is culturally appropriate for different regions. This can involve supplying different herbs and vegetables that are locally grown and used in different areas; avoiding foods with lactose, since many Indigenous people are lactose intolerant; and working with community leaders.

=== India ===
No Food Waste started in 2014 in the city of Coimbatore, Tamil Nadu. The organization has developed a food rescue and waste management network that recovers excess food from weddings, parties, and other events. In its Community Kitchens, No Food Waste makes and sells inexpensive hot meals for daily wage earners and others. Women from shelters and self-help groups help to staff the community kitchens and receive training in employable skills. No Food Waste serves over 5,000 people a day in 15 cities.

=== Israel ===
Leket Israel is Israel's National Food Bank. It was started in 2003 by Joseph Gitler, an immigrant from the United States, in response to the waste he saw after weddings and other celebrations. Initially known as Table to Table, Leket Israel redistributes agricultural produce and cooked meals to those in need. Among its programs, Leket Israel's Soup Program delivers meals to the housebound. With the help of dietitians from the Ministry of Health of Israel, Leket holds nutrition workshops in Hebrew, Arabic, Russian and Amharic.

=== New Zealand ===
New Zealand's first food rescue organization, Kaibosh, was founded in Wellington in August 2008 by Robyn Langlands. Langlands began by picking up food one night a week from a local store for the Wellington Women’s Refuge. Kaibosh has opened warehouses to store and organize food, hired drivers to transport donations, and helped to change legislation in 2014 to enable businesses to donate food without liability. As of 2022, Kaibosh operates three branches in Wellington, redistributing 60 tonnes of surplus food each month to more than 130 charities and organisations. Their goal is to achieve "Zero food poverty. Zero food waste." The General Manager of Kaibosh is Matt Dagger.

KiwiHarvest (originally FoodShare Dunedin) was established by Deborah Manning in the city of Dunedin on the South Island of New Zealand in March 2012. KiwiHarvest is part of the Aotearoa Food Rescue Alliance. It has received some support from the Ministry for the Environment through the Waste Minimisation Fund. A national food waste campaign, "Love Food, Hate Waste", is credited with popularizing FoodShare's model and helping it to expand to cities such as Auckland.

Fair Food, Auckland's first food rescue organisation, was founded in 2011. Other organizations work in cities such as Hamilton, Tauranga, Palmerston North, and Christchurch.

In Australia, initiatives for food rescue have been linked to a broader "Fair Food" or "Community Food" movement. Discussions of how food systems work include food security, food rescue, poverty, fair prices for farmers and producers, community and home gardening, locally sourced food, buying Australian, and food sovereignty.

=== Norway ===
A 2015 study listed 53 charitable organisations that were actively running food rescue programs in Norway. The largest donors were supermarkets (59%), followed by bakeries and other food producers. As of 2017, 98% of Norwegian supermarkets sold discounted food with a short shelf life in special areas, but only 48% of the supermarkets donated surplus foods to charity. Two supermarkets were highly active in donating surplus food: KIWI (90% of stores) and REMA 1000 (80% of stores). The distributors of rescued food were mainly charitable organizations, often religious, like the Salvation Army and the Church City Mission. Most of the work was done by volunteers, giving away food as prepared meals or bags of groceries. Distribution of free food was often used as a method for charitable organizations to enter into contact with people who need further help.

On June 23, 2017, five Norwegian government Ministries and twelve of the country's food industry organizations signed a binding agreement to halve food waste by 2030. The goal applies to all sectors of the food value chain from primary production to consumer. Responsibility was placed on those in the food industry to determine steps to be taken. Both authorities and the food industry are responsible for monitoring impact. Initiatives taken include the education of consumers about the meaning of "use by" and "best before" sale dates, the transfer of remaindered foods to charitable organizations for food rescue, and the development of a chain of grocery stores selling discounted foods that near their "best before" dates.

=== Singapore ===
In Singapore the Foodbank Singapore is running their own Food rescue project, by collecting food excess in various places around the island state. After identifying a need for food accessibility 24 hours a day, Foodbank Singapore introduced Food Pantry 2.0 in 2019, distributing food through vending machines at locations that are accessible 24/7 to those with a special food credit card.

=== South Africa ===
In South Africa, the Department of Environment, Forestry & Fisheries reports that about 1/3 of the country's food production is wasted annually: over 10 million tonnes of food. An estimated 30 million people are food insecure. FoodForward SA provides 950,000 meals daily to people in disadvantaged communities across the country. Its food distribution model connects with farmers, manufacturers, and retailers throughout the food chain. FoodForward SA was established in 2009 and as of 2019, developed a system of distribution points or Mobile Rural Depots (MRD) to better reach under-served rural communities in South Africa. Each depot receives monthly food supply deliveries from FoodForward SA trucks. Local partner organizations collect and distribute food at the depots. In 2020, the MRD program worked with 108 organizations to feed over 50,000 people in remote areas.

=== South Korea ===
Beginning in Seoul, South Korea, in 2013, households were assessed a fee for recycling, based on the amount of food waste they discarded. The volume of waste in Seoul decreased by 10% over four years, and the program was expanded to 16 more Korean cities.

=== United Kingdom ===
One estimate of waste in the United Kingdom suggests that 13.1 Mt of food waste is generated annually across the supply chain. The average household is estimated to discard the equivalent of eight meals per week. Organizations such as Fareshare and Waste and Resources Action Programme (WRAP) work directly with food manufacturers to minimize food wastage in the United Kingdom. WRAP reported that over 106,000 tonnes of surplus food was redistributed in 2021, representing 253 million meals with a value of over £330 million. 69% of the surplus food was redistributed via charitable channels.

=== United States ===
The EPA estimated that in 2015, the USA produced over 39 million tons of food waste. The U.S. Department of Agriculture (USDA) and the U.S. Environmental Protection Agency (EPA) supported the 2015 Sustainable Development Goals of a 50% reduction of food waste. In supermarkets in 2018, 20–40% of produce was thrown away for not meeting cosmetic standards, even though much of it was edible.

Numerous food rescue organizations and volunteers throughout the United States pick up and deliver food from companies and individuals, using refrigerated trucks where necessary. Recipient agencies tend to serve people of low and no income.

Sustainable America manages a directory of food rescue organizations that can be searched online, The Food Rescue Locator. The U.S. Department of Agriculture (USDA) has a Hunger Hotline at the telephone number 1.866.3.HUNGRY (1-866-348-6479).

John van Hengel in Phoenix, Arizona, founded the world's first food bank, St. Mary's Food Bank, in 1967 and created a national network for food banks, Second Harvest (later America's Second Harvest), in 1979. In 2008, Second Harvest changed its name to Feeding America to better reflect the organization's mission. Feeding America includes over 200 regional food banks as members.

External videos
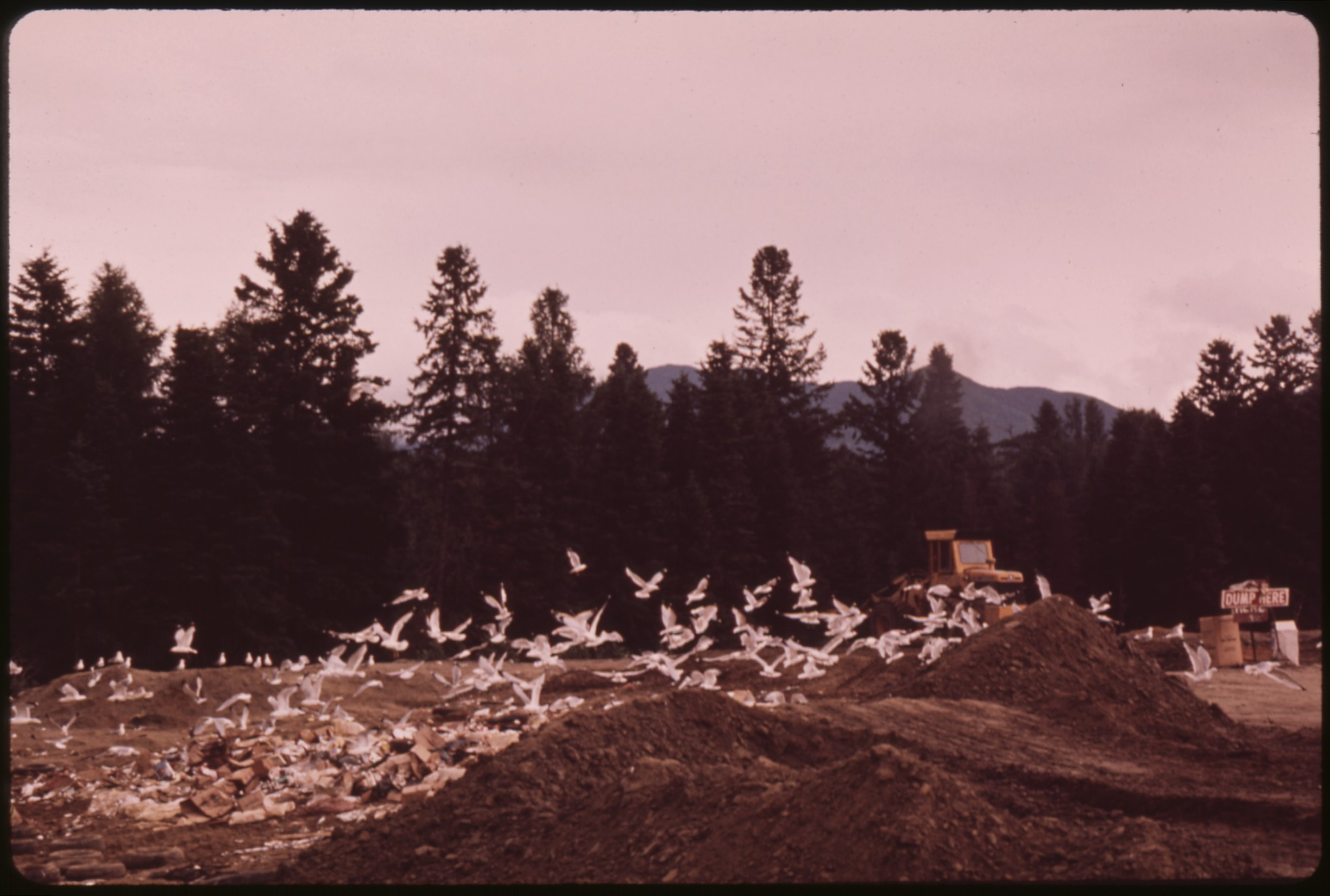
- Feeding America Food Rescue , April 21, 2017
- Wasted! The Story of Food Waste Trailer for documentary produced by Anthony Bourdain (2017)

Other nationally known food rescue organizations include The Farmlink Project in more than 48 states, Food Rescue US in more than 20 states and Washington, DC; La Soupe, based in Cincinnati, Ohio; City Harvest in New York City; and Philabundance and Sharing Excess in Philadelphia, Pennsylvania. The Society of St. Andrew is a volunteer and faith-based gleaning nonprofit that works with farms and orchards.

Feeding America estimates that food insecurity increased by 50 percent during the COVID-19 pandemic, and that one of every five Americans sought assistance from food banks, pantries, and other programs for food assistance. City Harvest reported that the five boroughs of New York City, food pantries served about 3.5 million monthly visitors in 2022, up 69% from 2019.

Waste No Food, Food Rescue US, Sharing Excess and other organizations use app technology to notify charities where and when excess food is available to aid in their food recovery efforts. 412 Food Rescue, formed in Pittsburgh in 2015, is testing the potential of using autonomous cars to pick up and deliver surplus food supplies, to overcome the issue of a shortage of drivers.

==== National Strategy for Reducing Food Loss and Waste and Recycling Organics ====
In June 2024, the USDA published the "National Strategy for Reducing Food Loss and Waste and Recycling Organics," which outlines plans for the US to cut food loss and waste in half by 2030, as part of the National Food Loss and Waste Reduction Goal, and achieve a 50% recycling rate by 2030, as part of the National Recycling Goal.

The plan outlines four main objectives which are: prevent food loss, prevent food waste, increase the recycling rate for all organic waste, and support policies that incentivize and encourage the prevention of food loss and waste and organics recycling.

The plan calls on the EPA, USDA and FDA to address challenges in the way and build on efforts towards these goals.

== See also ==
- Feeding America
- Freeganism
- Food loss and waste
- Food race
- Garbage picking
- Love Food, Hate Waste
- Pending meal
- Right to food
- United States Department of Agriculture
- Upcycling
- Waste minimisation
