= La Soupe =

US nonprofit food rescue organization

- Formation: 2014
- Founder: Suzy DeYoung
- Founded at: Cincinnati, Ohio
- Type: Nonprofit
- Purpose: Food rescue, Food insecurity

La Soupe is a Cincinnati, Ohio, nonprofit organization that uses discarded food to produce meals and delivers them to other nonprofit agencies for distribution to people experiencing food insecurity.

== History ==
La Soupe was founded in 2014 by Cincinnati chef and restaurateur Suzy DeYoung, daughter of chef and restaurateur Pierre Adrian of The Maisonette. After 25 years in the restaurant industry, she was experiencing burnout and realized what she really enjoyed about cooking was feeding people. She read a Facebook post from a local teacher describing students so hungry they had trouble climbing the school's staircase. DeYoung that same day took lunches of soup and fruit salad from her restaurant to the school, sending students home with quarts of soup for their families, and soon after changed her restaurant's business model to one in which the restaurant donated a quart of soup to a local nonprofit for every quart purchased by a customer. She converted the restaurant to a nonprofit after realizing she could not continue to self-fund the effort.

As of January 2019 the organization estimates they have accepted donations of 639,000 pounds (290,000 kg) of discarded food and donated 357,000 meals. In February 2019 they estimated they accept 5,000 pounds (2,300 kg) of perishables and provide 3000 servings to partner agencies each week using six burners and a tilt skillet in a 900-square-foot (84 m^{2}) space.

In 2019 La Soupe announced they were planning to move to the Walnut Hills neighborhood of Cincinnati, which is a food desert. The new space is 5,000 square feet (460 m^{2}) in size and will contain kitchen, a carryout counter, and teaching space. The move is planned for September 2019.

== Model ==
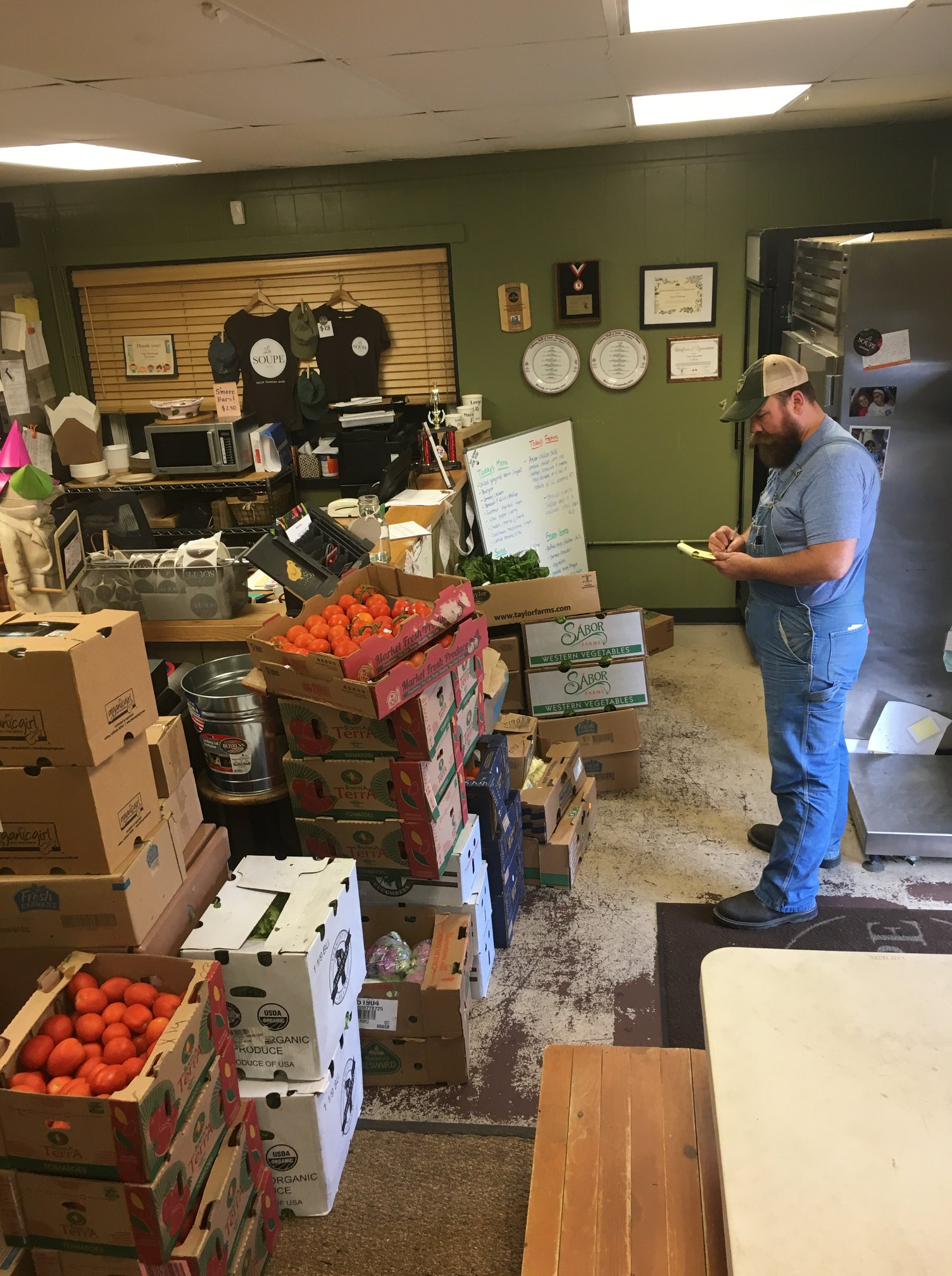
A chef inventorying rescued produce at La Soupe

La Soupe partners with local restaurants, farms, bakeries, grocery stores, and food pantries to accept donations of still-usable ingredients that would otherwise be discarded and delivers them to local chefs who prepare meals in their restaurant kitchens. DeYoung describes the process as "a less glamorous, industrial-scale version of Chopped," a television show that gives chefs minutes to prepare dishes from a mystery box of random ingredients. After volunteer drivers have delivered donations, volunteer chefs must quickly develop recipes to use them. La Soupe volunteer drivers then pick up and deliver the prepared meals to schools, churches, food pantries, and homeless shelters for distribution.

Meals are usually soups, usually accompanied by a mixed salad and rescued baked goods, because soup is stretchable and can be reheated in a microwave or on a hotplate by someone with no cooking skills.

The organization works primarily with volunteers and a paid staff of 11. The organization operates a take-out business in a "poor, rural area" east of Cincinnati to bring in operational funds.

In 2017 The Cincinnati Enquirer dining editor Polly Campbell called La Soupe's business model "so unique and effective that the nonprofit was honored recently with an award that is thought of as the U.S. Nobel Prize for public and community service," the Jacqueline Kennedy Onassis Award for Outstanding Public Service Benefiting Local Communities, one of five honorees nationwide that year.

== Programs ==
=== Ongoing ===
La Soupe's "Bucket Brigade" consists of a network of restaurateurs, including more than 60 local chefs, who accept donations through La Soupe and use their own surplus ingredients to make soup in their own restaurant kitchens. La Soupe volunteers pick up and distribute the prepared items to local nonprofits.

"Soupe Mobile" is a food truck with a "pay what you can" pricing model.

"Cincinnati Gives A Crock" provides cooking lessons and a crockpot to teens.

=== Ad hoc ===
In January 2019 La Soupe coordinated with Cincinnati State's Midwest Culinary Institute to offer eat-in or pickup meals to furloughed government workers. Area chefs volunteered to prepare the meals, and the Freestore Foodbank supplied pick up bags of food for attendees to take home. An estimated 2000 local workers and their families were served onsite at Cincinnati State or sent home with 9600 servings of food.

== Awards and honors ==
- 2016: Outstanding Not-for-profit Business Leadership, National Recycling Commission
- 2016: Snail of Approval
- 2017: Jacqueline Kennedy Onassis Award for Outstanding Public Service Benefiting Local Communities

In 2019 DeYoung keynoted Knoxville, Tennessee's Women in Philanthropy Fundraising Luncheon

== See also ==
- Food rescue
- Food insecurity
