= Farm Storage Facility Loan Program =

The Farm Storage Facility Loan Program is a loan program for the construction and remodeling of storage facilities on farms producing grains, oilseeds, and pulses. The loan limit for each borrower is $100,000 for up to seven years. The interest rate is equivalent to the rate on comparable term Treasury securities. The program is administered by the Farm Service Agency (FSA). The 2002 farm bill (P.L. 107-171, Sec. 1402) newly mandated storage facility loans for raw and refined sugar.
