= Philabundance =

U.S. non-profit organization

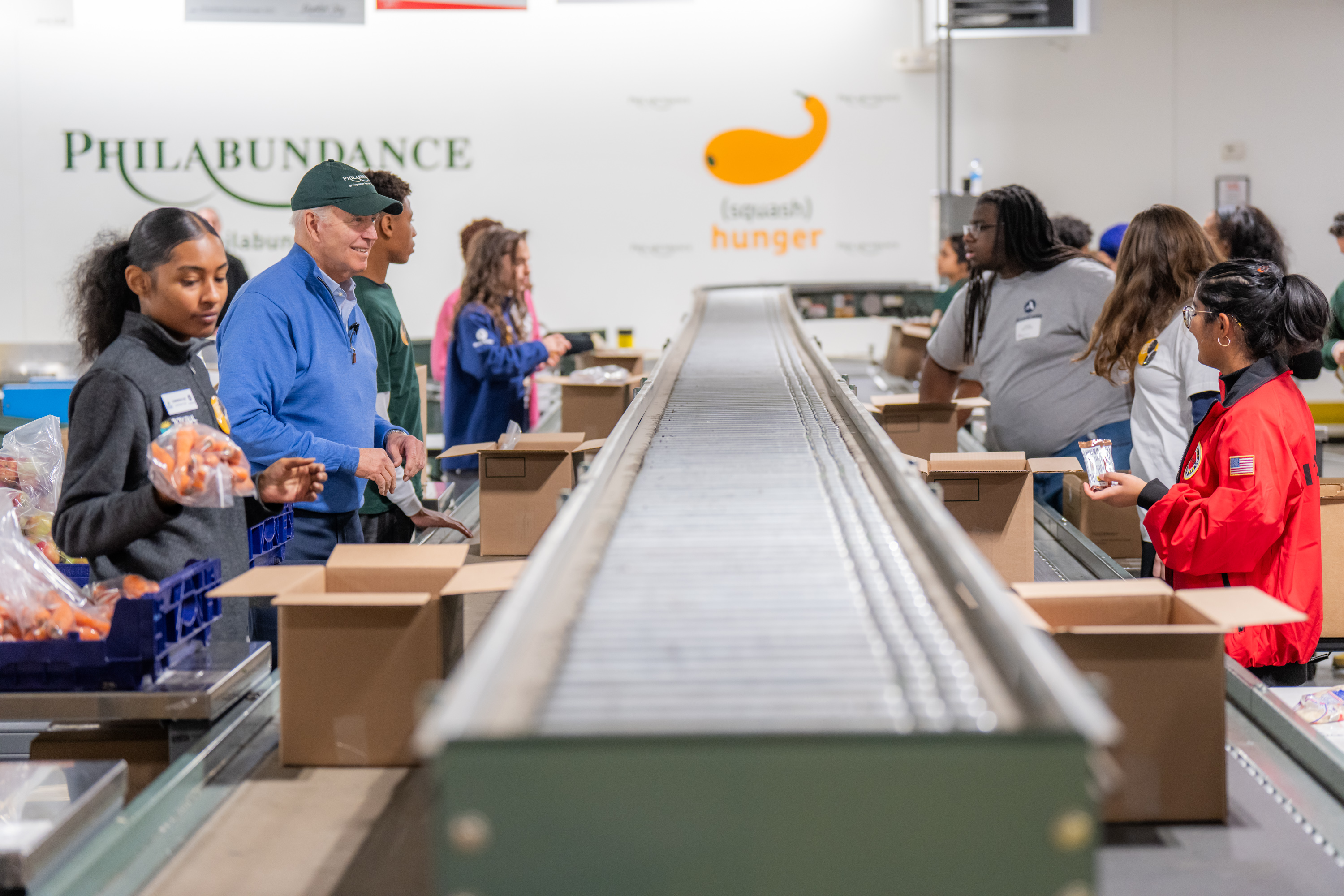
- Packing food boxes, 2024
- Formation: 1984
- Founder: Pamela Rainey Lawler
- Type: Non-profit food bank
- Registration no.: 23-2290505
- Location: Philadelphia, Pennsylvania, U.S.
- Region served: Philadelphia metropolitan area
- Chief Executive Officer: Loree D. Jones
- Senior Vice President, CIO: Melanie S. Cataldi
- Senior Vice President, CDO: Sara Hertz
- Senior Vice President, CPO: Stacey Behm
- Board of directors: John Hollway; Chair; Alan E. Casnoff; Vice Chair; Noel Eisenstat; Vice Chair; Dixieanne James; Vice Chair; Pam Carter, PHDt; Board Secretary; Robert J. ."BJ" Clark; Vice Chair; Andrew Sandifer; Board Treasurer
- Affiliations: Feeding America
- Revenue: US$48,163,024 (FY16)
- Expenses: US$48,003,360 (FY16)
- Staff: 200 (2015)
- Volunteers: 16,000 (2015)
- Website: www.philabundance.org

Philabundance is a non-profit food bank that serves the Philadelphia metropolitan area region of Pennsylvania, United States. It is the largest such organization in the region. The organization stated goal is to end hunger in its communities.

== History ==
The organization was founded in 1984 by Pam Lawler. In 2005, it merged with The Greater Philadelphia Food Bank, and the new entity operates under the name Philabundance.

== Organization ==
Philabundance serves 90,000 people each week, 30% of whom are children, 15% of whom are seniors, and others. It has programs and a network of 350 agencies.

Philabundance works with local grocers and farmers for food management; in 2016, it rescued 10 million pounds of food. The organization also hosts events alongside the Greater Philadelphia Coalition Against Hunger.

Philabundance's partner, the Chester County Food Bank, and other Feeding America food banks have partnered with colleges to provide food to schools.

== Programs ==
- Fresh For All Program – Operated at nine locations in Pennsylvania and New Jersey, it has the goal of serving greens.
- Senior Boxes Program – Gives USDA-sponsored food boxes to approximately 5,000 low-income senior citizens.
- Philabundance Community Kitchen – A job training program for the unemployed.
- Grocers Against Hunger – Allows participating grocers to donate surplus inventory to Philabundance. In 2015, the program saved approximately 10 million pounds of produce.
- KidsBites – KidsBites has provided almost 250,000 pounds of food to people. Philabundance offers several other program models: Mobile Pantry, BackPacks, and LunchBoxes.

== Fundraising contributions ==
Following are some of the largest annual contributions:

- Phans Feeding Families: The Philadelphia Phillies and the Citizens Bank sponsor the annual Phans Feeding Families program, which consists of a night at the ballpark at which there are raffles and fundraisers, as well as food collections at NRG Station and Citizens Bank Park. Citizen Bank makes an annual donation of $40,000 to support Philabundance's KidsBites initiative.
- SEPTA Stop Hunger at Your Station – SEPTA supports Philabundance annually by collecting money for food at more than 40 SEPTA stations.
- 93.3 WMMR's Preston & Steve Camp Out for Hunger – Since 1998, Preston & Steve have held a five-day "Camp Out for Hunger" event, most recently, at the Xfinity Live! complex. This raises more than 2.6 million pounds of food, US$200,000 in 2019, and over 14 million pounds since its inception.
- 6 ABC's Holiday Food Drive: Each year, 6 ABC and partners Dunkin' Donuts and ACME raise food, funds, and awareness of Philabundance from Thanksgiving through the New Year. Elements of the campaign include donations at ACME stores, a 6 ABC telethon, and Dunkin' Donuts in-store promotions.
- Toyota Hauls Away Hunger: The Toyota Dealership Association of the Delaware Valley holds a food drive each December, with around 50 Tundras caravaning from Philabundance's warehouse in North Philly to Citizen Bank Park's parking lot.
- Fraud Street Run: Two Philadelphia runners, Chip and Jeff of the Junk Miles podcast, organised a charity run inspired by the Four Seasons Total Landscaping press conference. The event raised nearly US$63,000.

== See also ==
- Food salvage
- Food rescue
- Food waste
- List of food banks
