= Koret Foundation =

Nonprofit organization in San Francisco, United States

The Koret Foundation is a private foundation based in San Francisco, California. Its mission is to strengthen the Bay Area and support the Jewish community in the U.S. and Israel through grantmaking to organizations involved with education, arts and culture, the Jewish community, and the Bay Area community. The foundation takes an approach of testing new ideas and bringing people and organizations together to help solve societal and systemic problems of common concern.

== Leadership ==
The Koret Foundation is led by a four-member board of directors: Michael Boskin, president; Anita Friedman, president; Richard Greene; and Abraham Sofaer. Its professional staff is led by chief executive officer Jeffrey Farber.

== Grantmaking ==
The Koret Foundation’s grantmaking is grounded in Jewish principles and traditions and dedicated to serving the general Bay Area community and Jewish community. It supports organizations and initiatives in education (K-12 and higher education), arts and culture, Jewish peoplehood, U.S.-Israel bridge-building, and special projects.

=== Education ===
A key goal of Koret’s education grantmaking is to increase access to education and to implement new ways of optimizing student success, improving completion rates, and bolstering career advancement opportunities.

In spring 2020, Koret announced $50 million in grants to 12 colleges and universities across the Bay Area, including UC Berkeley, Stanford University, University of San Francisco, UC Davis, UC San Francisco, San Jose State University, Santa Clara University, UC Santa Cruz, City College of San Francisco, Sonoma State University, CSU Monterey Bay and the Cal State Hayward Education Foundation. The grants help fund scholarships, research, mentorship programs, career prep and virtual learning services as schools adjust to disruptions caused by the COVID-19 pandemic. This includes $10 million in grants for the Koret Scholars Program, which provides funds for nine colleges and universities in the Bay Area to help underserved students cope with the impacts of the virus. The scholarships come in the form of direct financial aid and high-impact learning opportunities. Beneficiaries include UC Berkeley, UC Davis, University of San Francisco and six others.

In 2019, Koret launched a three-year “K-12 Education Innovation Initiative” granting $11 million to 35 organizations devoted to ensuring more equal access to K-12 education, STEM learning, teacher training, and skills- and opportunity-building programs for underserved students in the Bay Area. Recipients of the funding included the National Math and Science Initiative, Beyond 12, the Hoover Institution, College Track, KQED, the YMCA of San Francisco, KIPP Bay Area and Teach for America Bay Area.

In fall 2019, Koret made a $10 million grant to the University of California San Francisco and the nonprofit That Man May See, to build a new Koret Vision Clinic at UCSF, which opened in 2020. The clinic will be a site for research and teaching, and will convene leading experts to collaborate with one another, patients, and the community. Its mission is to increase accessible and innovative vision care for the Bay Area and beyond.

=== Jewish Community and Israel ===
Koret’s Jewish community grantmaking seeks to inspire Jewish identification and increase participation in Jewish life; strengthen ties between Israel and the Bay Area; combat anti-Semitism; and develop a flourishing Jewish community in the Bay Area, Israel, Poland, and globally.

Koret has invested in pillar community institutions like Bay Area Jewish Community Centers (JCCs) for over 30 years, campus organizations like Hillel centers, and a set of programs aimed at engaging Jewish young adults.

In 2020, Koret granted $10 million to the USC Shoah Foundation and the Hold On To Your Music Foundation for new music-based Holocaust education programs. The grant will fund a new curriculum that combines testimony, technology, and music in order to provide Holocaust education for primary and secondary school-aged children around the world. Ultimately, it will reach 25,000 educators and 8 million students through the delivery of educational programming, professional development, innovative educational tools, and live, virtual and immersive performances.

In summer 2019, Koret made a $10 million grant to the Shalom Hartman Institute of North America to expand its work across five cities: San Francisco, New York, Los Angeles, Washington, D.C. and Detroit. The funding for SHI’s work in these cities focuses on developing local community leaders, conducting more research to help the community tackle local challenges, and funding more campus and communal programs to engage the local Jewish community.

Koret has also given to a variety of academic collaborations to strengthen ties between the U.S. and Israel in areas of great concern to society. In 2018, Koret announced a $10 million grant to Tel Aviv University for a collaboration in bioinformatics with UC Berkeley and smart cities with Stanford University. In February 2020, Koret announced a new $1.3 million grant to UC San Diego to support binational collaboration between its Scripps Center for Marine Archeology and the University of Haifa in Israel. The three-year grant supports scientific collaboration between the two schools on climate/environmental change and marine archeology.

=== Bay Area Community ===
As part of Koret’s work to create a dynamic, diverse, and livable Bay Area, the Foundation supports organizations that address the region’s needs, strengthen its social fabric, and improve the quality of life for its residents.

Koret has supported the San Francisco Parks Alliance and SF Parks and Recreation for the Let’s Play Initiative, and has made grants to help rebuild the Golden Gate Park Tennis Center, which caters to underserved youth. Since the onset of the COVID-19 pandemic, Koret has prioritized its giving to help those most adversely affected by the virus and the accompanying economic crisis.

In October 2020, Koret announced $5 million in emergency funding for Bay Area food banks that are struggling with the COVID-19 crisis. The funds will last through 2024, and will help food banks and meal delivery services cope with increased demand stemming from the pandemic’s economic impacts. Recipients of the funding include the Alameda County Community Food Bank, the GLIDE Foundation, Jewish Family and Children’s Services, Meals on Wheels San Francisco, the San Francisco-Marin Food Bank, Second Harvest of Silicon Valley and St. Anthony’s Foundation. Koret has funded food programs in the region since the Foundation’s inception.

In summer 2019, Koret announced $1.2 million in grants for Bay Area organizations serving veterans in the community. The grants, disbursed over three years, focus on supporting veterans in the transition to civilian life, workforce development, health care and more. Organizations that received funding include Goodwill Industries of San Francisco, San Mateo and Marin, VA Palo Alto Health Care System, Higher Ground, Hire Heroes USA, The Mission Continues and the Foothill-De Anza Community College Foundation.

In 2018, Koret announced $10 million in funding for various arts and cultural programs in the Bay Area. These multi-year grants are intended to help spur greater engagement with the arts in the community, including musical, performing and visual arts. Recipients of this funding include the San Francisco Museum of Modern Art, San Francisco Symphony, SFJAZZ, San Francisco Ballet, Berkeley Repertory Theatre, Oakland Museum of California, Fine Arts Museums of San Francisco, Cal Performances, San Francisco Opera, Stanford Live, The Contemporary Jewish Museum, Asian Art Museum of San Francisco and the San Francisco Conservatory of Music.

== History ==
The foundation was organized in 1979 by Stephanie and Joseph Koret, along with Tad Taube, their family friend and chief executive officer of their women's sportswear company, Koret of California. Stephanie died in 1978, and Joseph died in 1982. Tad Taube was instrumental in leading the Foundation and growing its assets from around $35 million to nearly $500 million today.

In 2016, a settlement was reached in a lawsuit brought against the Koret Foundation by Susan Koret, the widow of its founder. Susan Koret retired from the board in 2016 and Tad Taube—the former board president—retired from the board in 2017.
