= Sara Cody =

American epidemiologist

Sara H. Cody
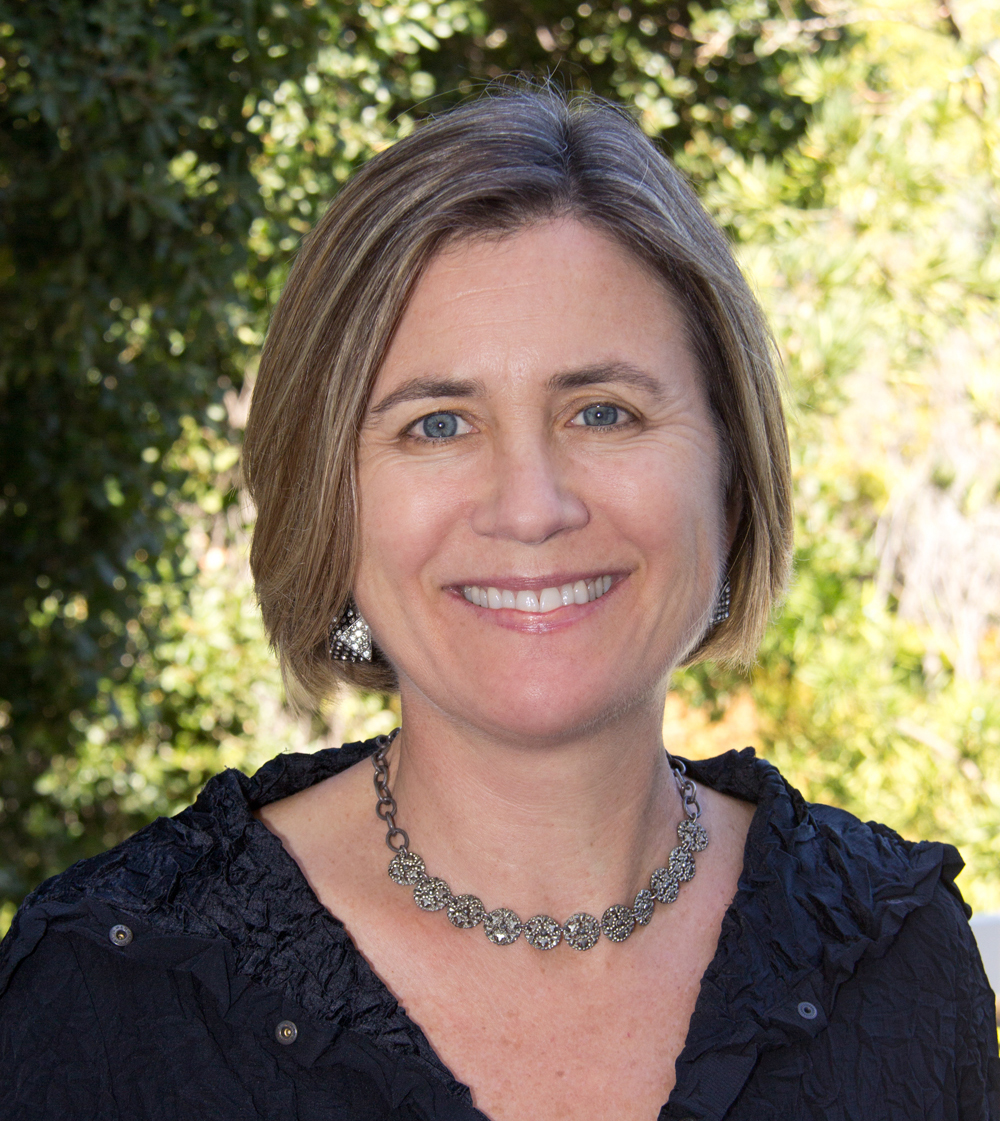

Public health director of Santa Clara County, California
- In office July 6, 2015 – April 11, 2025
- Succeeded by: Sarah Rudman

Health officer of Santa Clara County, California
- In office October 2013 – April 11, 2025
- Preceded by: Marty Fenstersheib
- Succeeded by: Sarah Rudman

Personal details
- Born: Palo Alto, California
- Education: Stanford University; Yale University School of Medicine (MD)
- Known for: First mainland U.S. official to implement a stay-at-home order to combat COVID-19 outbreak
- Scientific career
- Fields: Epidemiology and public health
- Workplaces: Centers for Disease Control and Prevention

Sara H. Cody, M.D, is an American physician, epidemiologist, and public health official who served as the health officer and also as the public health director of Santa Clara County, California. At the time of the 2020 COVID-19 outbreak, she became a regular presence in the media to communicate COVID-19 news and policy.

== Education ==
Cody was born and grew up in Palo Alto, California, where she graduated from Palo Alto High School. She earned a degree in human biology from Stanford University and a Doctor of Medicine from Yale School of Medicine. Following residency in internal medicine at Stanford University Medical Center, she completed a two-year fellowship in epidemiology and public health as an Epidemic Intelligence Service (EIS) officer ("disease detective") with the Centers for Disease Control and Prevention.

== Career ==
During her fellowship as an EIS officer, she investigated the 1996 international outbreak of E. coli O157:H7 that was linked to unpasteurized Odwalla apple juice, which killed a 16-month-old girl and sickened 70 people, of whom 25 were hospitalized and 14 developed the hemolytic uremic syndrome. She also led an investigation into a salmonella outbreak in Santa Clara County that was traced to cheese made from raw milk and sold in local Hispanic markets.

After completion of this fellowship, Cody joined the Public Health Department of Santa Clara County. In 1998, she became the communicable disease controller and deputy health officer for the county. In this role she oversaw surveillance and investigation of 83 reportable diseases, conducted investigations on outbreaks, and responded to SARS, H1N1 and other public health emergencies. In the years after the September 11 attacks, Cody worked with the then-county health officer Marty Fenstersheib to model Santa Clara County's emergency response to a bioterrorism attack or pandemic. This model included such measures as social distancing, shutting schools, and at its most extreme, stay-at-home orders.

In October 2013, Cody became county health officer. Since July 2015, she has also been the director of the Santa Clara County Public Health Department.

Cody retired on April 11, 2025, after serving as a Santa Clara County official for almost 27 years. Deputy Health Officer Dr. Sarah Rudman filled her dual positions, initially in an acting capacity.

=== COVID-19 outbreak ===
Along with other public health officers in the region, Cody was largely credited for promptly advocating for measures that would limit the spread of COVID-19 when the pandemic reached the United States in 2020. She led the Santa Clara County Public Health Department to establish an incident command center on January 23, three days after the first confirmed case in the country, then established a contact tracing mechanism in an effort to stop the propagation of the disease. Cody issued the first guidelines on the closure and cancellation of public gatherings on March 3, extending them on March 9 to sporting events, festivals, and bars.

She was an early advocate of requiring residents to "shelter-in-place", leading to the order imposed on March 16, 2020 in seven Bay Area counties, the first such order in the United States. California Governor Gavin Newsom extended the policy to the whole state three days later. Cody later explained: "If you are going to do something really drastic like shelter-in-place, you want to do it as early as you possibly can. Because if you wait to do it, you get all the harms, all of the social and economic disruptions, but you miss a lot of the benefit."

COVID-19 cases in Santa Clara County, California

Cody has made regular appearances on Bay Area press and video conferences, explaining county health policy and reminding residents that the COVID-19 battle is a long-term health concern. In a press conference in April 2020, Cody confirmed that the first United States COVID-19 death had actually occurred in the Bay Area on February 6, some 23 days prior to the previously known first death. This was the first of three early COVID-19 deaths that Cody described as "iceberg tips", suggesting a "vast and unseen propagation" of the virus. Following one news conference, she became the subject of a viral meme, after she implored citizens to refrain from touching their faces, then licked her finger to turn a page.

Cody received threats from residents unhappy with the drastic nature the measures put in place. In late August of 2020, the Santa Clara County Sheriff's Office announced that they had arrested a man suspected of sending her several threatening letters that used language typical of far-right movements. Police found 138 firearms at his residence. Charged with stalking and threatening a public official, he remained in jail while waiting for court proceedings. Cody was under 24-hour police protection.

=== Criticism ===
On several occasions Cody has cited the effectiveness of the enacted mandates without providing data or evidence to back up her claims. The mandates were set without any exit metrics to be tracked. At a meeting of the Santa Clara County Board of Supervisors in September 2021, Cody cited masks as the reason why Santa Clara County had minimal influenza cases in the winter of 2021, and was reminded by a supervisor that the entire area was under shelter in place at that time, with only essential businesses open.

== Awards ==
Cody received numerous awards for her role in the COVID-19 pandemic response, including:

- Certificate of Recognition, United States Congress
- Certificate of Recognition, California State Assembly
- Milton and Ruth Roemer Prize for Creative Local Public Health Work, American Public Health Association (2020)
- Tall Tree Global Impact Award, Palo Alto Chamber of Commerce and Palo Alto Weekly (2022)

== Personal life ==
Cody lives in Palo Alto near her childhood home. She has a son and a daughter with her husband, a Stanford University professor of medicine and health policy.
