= COVID-19 pandemic in the San Francisco Bay Area =

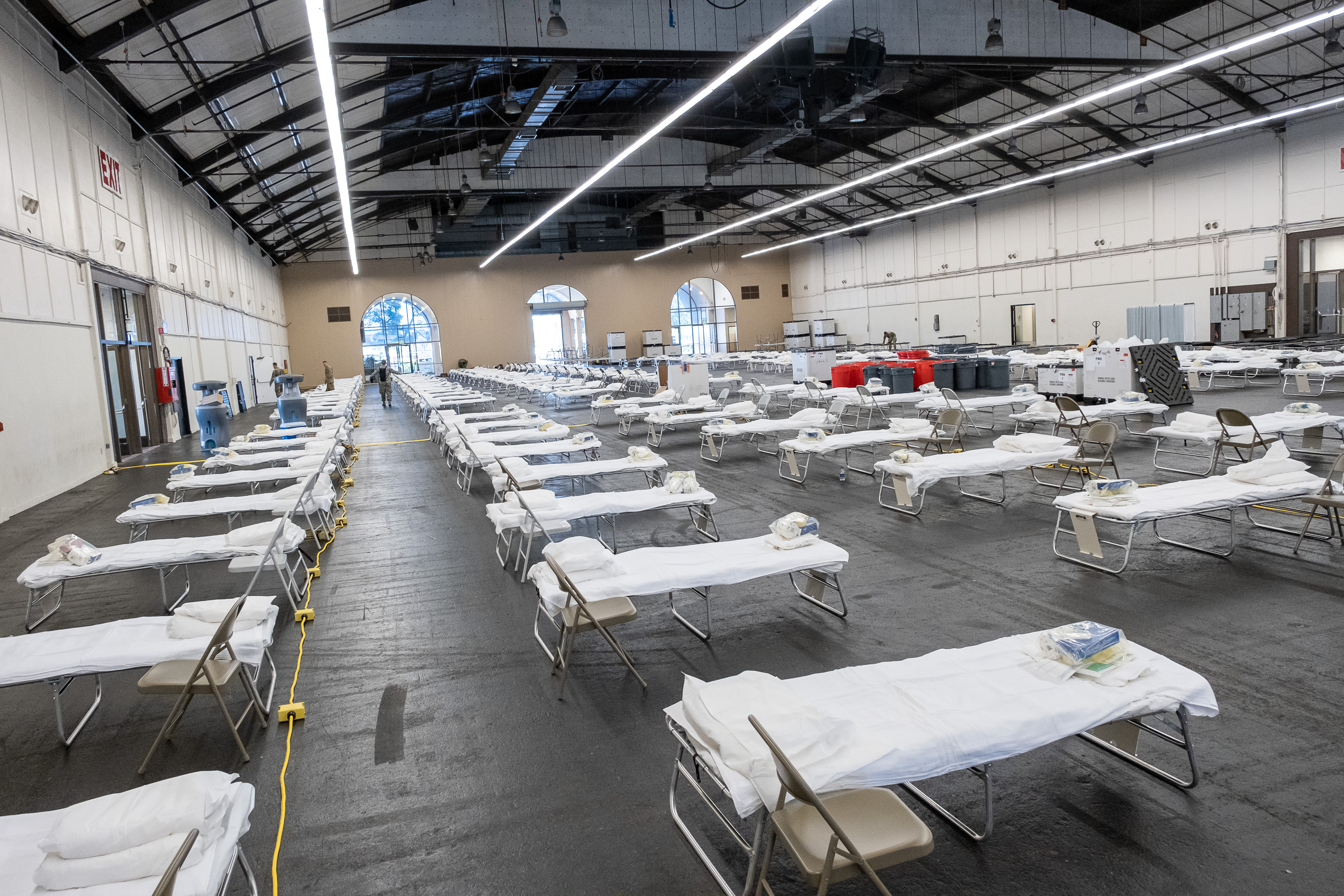
- A Federal Medical Station at the San Mateo County Event Center shortly after it opened
- Disease: COVID-19
- Pathogen: SARS-CoV-2
- Location: San Francisco Bay Area, California, U.S.
- First outbreak: Wuhan, Hubei, China
- Index case: Santa Clara County
- Arrival date: January 5, 2020
- Confirmed cases: 1,949,198 in 9 counties
- Recovered: 572,344 in 5 counties
- Deaths: 11,356 in 9 counties

The San Francisco Bay Area, which includes the major cities of San Jose, San Francisco, and Oakland, was an early center of the COVID-19 pandemic in California. The first case of COVID-19 in the area was confirmed in Santa Clara County on January 31, 2020. A Santa Clara County resident (with no foreign travel history) was the earliest known death caused by COVID-19 in the United States, on February 6, suggesting that community spread of COVID-19 had been occurring long before any actual documented case. This article covers the 13 members of ABAHO, which includes the nine-county Bay Area plus the counties of Monterey, San Benito, and Santa Cruz.

Local officials instituted some of the first mitigation efforts in the United States. The first mandatory stay-at-home order in the mainland U.S. took effect throughout the Bay Area on March 16 and 17 and continued until mid-May, affecting nearly 6.7 million people. The early government response is credited with mitigating the spread of infection compared to cities on the East Coast.

Closures due to the pandemic have resulted in mass unemployment and significant disruptions to the economy, replacing local governments' budget surpluses with historic deficits. The pandemic accelerated the adoption of distance education among schools and remote work among businesses, especially in the technology industry. Air quality around San Francisco Bay improved as a result of a temporary decline in traffic volume.

== Prevalence ==
COVID-19 pandemic medical cases in the San Francisco Bay Area by county
Counties	Cases (Note: Cumulative cases reported by each county's health department. Cases reported are those of county residents, including those who tested positive elsewhere in California.)	Recov. (Note: Counties differ in what they consider to be a recovery.)	Deaths	Pop. (2019)	C/1M	Ref.
9	1,949,198		11,356	7,739,378	251,855	Ref.
Santa Clara	539,714	?	3,226	1,927,852	279,956	d c
Alameda (Note: Including cases in the City of Berkeley, which are reported by the Berkeley Public Health Division.)	400,532	?	2,573	1,671,329	239,649	d c
Contra Costa	302,824	300,666	1,601	1,153,526	262,520	d c
San Francisco	203,788	?	1,420	881,549	231,170	d c
San Mateo	184,001	?	946	766,573	240,031	d c
Sonoma	119,749	118,903	668	494,336	242,242	d c
Solano	118,904	118,073	441	447,643	265,622	d c
Marin	44,650	7,030	274	258,826	172,510	d c
Napa	35,036	27,672	207	137,744	254,356	d c

Despite strong economic, cultural, and travel ties between California and China, the Bay Area's hospitalization rate and death toll have stayed below initial projections and have compared favorably to East Coast cities. Researchers have hypothesized that the pandemic's initial impact was blunted by relatively early social distancing measures along with a variety of other factors, including lower population density, a strong car culture and low public transportation ridership, favorable weather in February, and even a loss by the San Francisco 49ers at Super Bowl LIV, discouraging celebrations.

As of May 26, 2020, the nine counties of the Bay Area plus Santa Cruz County have reported a cumulative total of 13,060 confirmed cases and 434 confirmed deaths due to COVID-19. Alameda County has more confirmed cases and deaths than any other county in Northern California, followed by Contra Costa County. Some counties have released breakdowns of cases by jurisdiction. In Alameda County, Hayward has the highest per capita rate of infection at 270.2 people per every 100,000, while Oakland has the highest number of cases. San Mateo and San Jose have the highest number of cases in San Mateo and Santa Clara counties, respectively.

As of May 17, 2020, the North Bay counties of Marin, Napa, and Sonoma have reported a cumulative total of 345 recoveries from COVID-19. The other Bay Area counties do not report the number of recoveries, because tracking this number requires more resources per case and federal guidelines are not specific enough to draw conclusions. A study at the University of California, San Francisco (UCSF), is tracking outcomes several months after infection.

The Hispanic population in the Bay Area has been disproportionately affected by infections. The poor, largely Latino neighborhoods in East San Jose account for 34% of Santa Clara County's first deaths due to COVID-19 despite being Latinos making up only 23% of the adult population. Almost 70% of the neighborhoods' working-age population is unable to remote work. Filipino Americans in the Bay Area have also been disproportionately affected by COVID-19 infections, and make up the majority of cases in San Mateo County, California. In San Francisco, about 40% of Hispanics have been confirmed infected, compared to 15% of the general population. The largely Latino Mission District has the highest number of cases of any neighborhood, with more than 40 cases per 10,000 residents. UCSF systematically tested 2,959 residents in a 16-block census tract in the Mission District in April, finding that 2% tested positive. Infection rates differed significantly between essential workers and residents who were able to stay at home during the pandemic.

Localized outbreaks of COVID-19 have occurred at factories and care facilities, including the Tesla factory in Fremont where over 130 people tested positive, the Lusamerica Foods fish packing plant in Morgan Hill where 38 people tested positive, the Central Gardens skilled nursing home in San Francisco's Western Addition where four residents died, and the Windsor Vallejo Care Center in Vallejo where more than 130 people became infected and eleven residents died.

The number of confirmed cases is believed to fall significantly short of actual infection rates due to limited testing capacity throughout the pandemic. As of May 20, 2020, San Francisco has collected 5,000 tests for every 100,000 residents, while Santa Clara County has collected about 2,600 tests for every 100,000 residents. Santa Clara County set up three testing sites in San Jose, but the sites are operating well below capacity, in part because of Spanish- and Vietnamese-language barriers.

Several local studies have attempted to determine seroprevalence in the absence of widespread clinical testing. Based on serology tests in early April, a revised preprint study from Stanford University estimated that Santa Clara County up to 54,000 residents, or 2.8% of the population, had been infected, compared to the 1,000 confirmed cases at the time. In an earlier preprint, the study's authors had estimated an even higher rate of infection but therefore calculated a lower mortality rate. Despite academic controversy over the study's methodology, which prompted the revision, the preprint fueled opposition to stay-at-home orders in the United States. The university has begun an investigation into the study. In addition to its study in San Francisco's Mission District, UCSF is conducting a similar study of all 1,680 residents in the rural community of Bolinas, and the University of California, Berkeley, is testing a representative sample of 5,000 East Bay residents.

In October 2020, Santa Clara County began wastewater surveillance of the SARS-CoV-2 virus's RNA at the San José–Santa Clara Regional Wastewater Facility and three other regional wastewater treatment plants in Palo Alto, Sunnyvale, and Gilroy, which together serve the vast majority of residents in the county.

== Progression ==
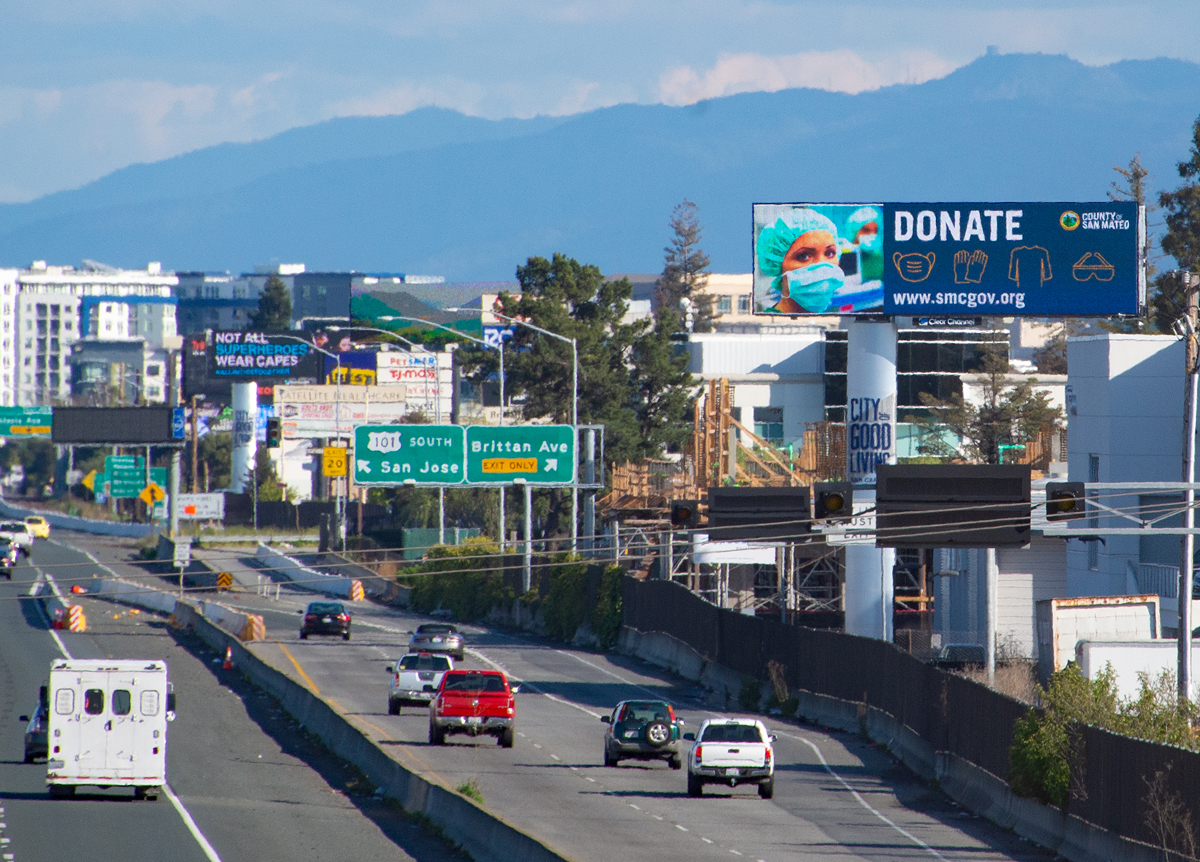
A billboard along U.S. Route 101 in San Carlos encourages San Mateo County residents to donate personal protective equipment to healthcare workers.

=== Early cases ===
There has been speculation that COVID-19 may have been circulating in the Bay Area by December 2019. Ongoing "lookback studies" are attempting to identify the index case. An initial preprint of a study at Stanford University Medical Center has found no infected samples from November and December 2019. As of February 14, 2021, the earliest known cases in Santa Clara County have been dated to January 27, 2020.

On January 31, 2020, the Centers for Disease Control and Prevention (CDC) announced the first confirmed case of COVID-19 in the Bay Area and the seventh in the United States, a man in Santa Clara County who had recently traveled to Wuhan. The man recovered at home and was released from in-home isolation on February 20. On February 2, the CDC confirmed a second area case in a Santa Clara County woman who had also recently traveled to Wuhan. The two cases were unrelated.

On February 6, 2020, 57-year-old Patricia Dowd of San Jose died of COVID-19 without any known recent foreign travel. She had been unusually sick from the flu in late January, then recovered, remote worked, and suddenly died at home on February 6. A February 7 autopsy was completed in April (after virus tests on tissue samples) and attributed the death to transmural myocardial ischemia (infarction) with a minor component of myocarditis due to COVID-19 infection. Her case was discovered in April 2020; from then until August 2021, she was considered to have been the first COVID-19-related death in the U.S. It indicated that community transmission was happening undetected in the U.S., most likely since December 2019.

On February 26, 2020, a case of unknown origin was confirmed in a resident of Solano County. The UC Davis Medical Center in Sacramento said that, when the person was transferred there on February 19, the medical team suspected it was COVID-19 and asked the CDC to test for SARS-CoV-2. The CDC initially refused since the person, who had no known exposure to the virus through travel or close contact with a known infected individual, did not meet the criteria for testing. The person was ultimately tested on February 23; the test results returned positive on February 26.

After this first case of community transmission in the U.S., the CDC revised its criteria for testing patients for SARS-CoV-2 and, on February 28, began sending out the new guidelines for healthcare workers.

The first case of the Omicron variant detected in the United States was also located in the Bay Area. A resident of San Francisco returned from South Africa on November 22, 2021, began showing mild symptoms on November 25, and was confirmed to have COVID-19 on November 29. The individual had been vaccinated but had not received a booster shot.

== Government response ==
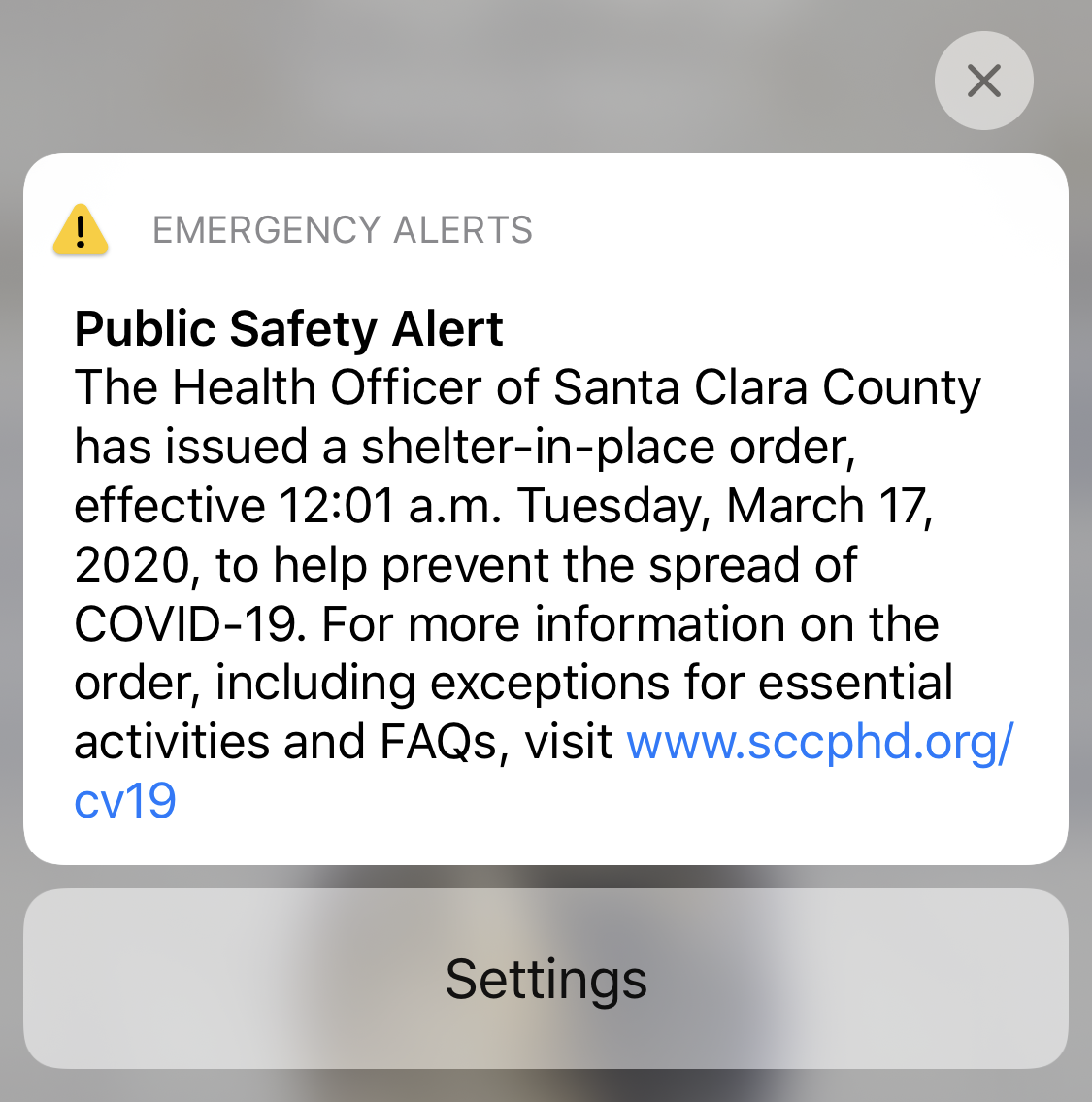
A public safety alert sent on March 16 by Santa Clara County about the shelter-in-place order

As of April 7, the Santa Clara County Public Health Department and Stanford University School of Medicine projected that the county would have had several times more cases of COVID-19 by May without the regional and state shelter-in-place orders.

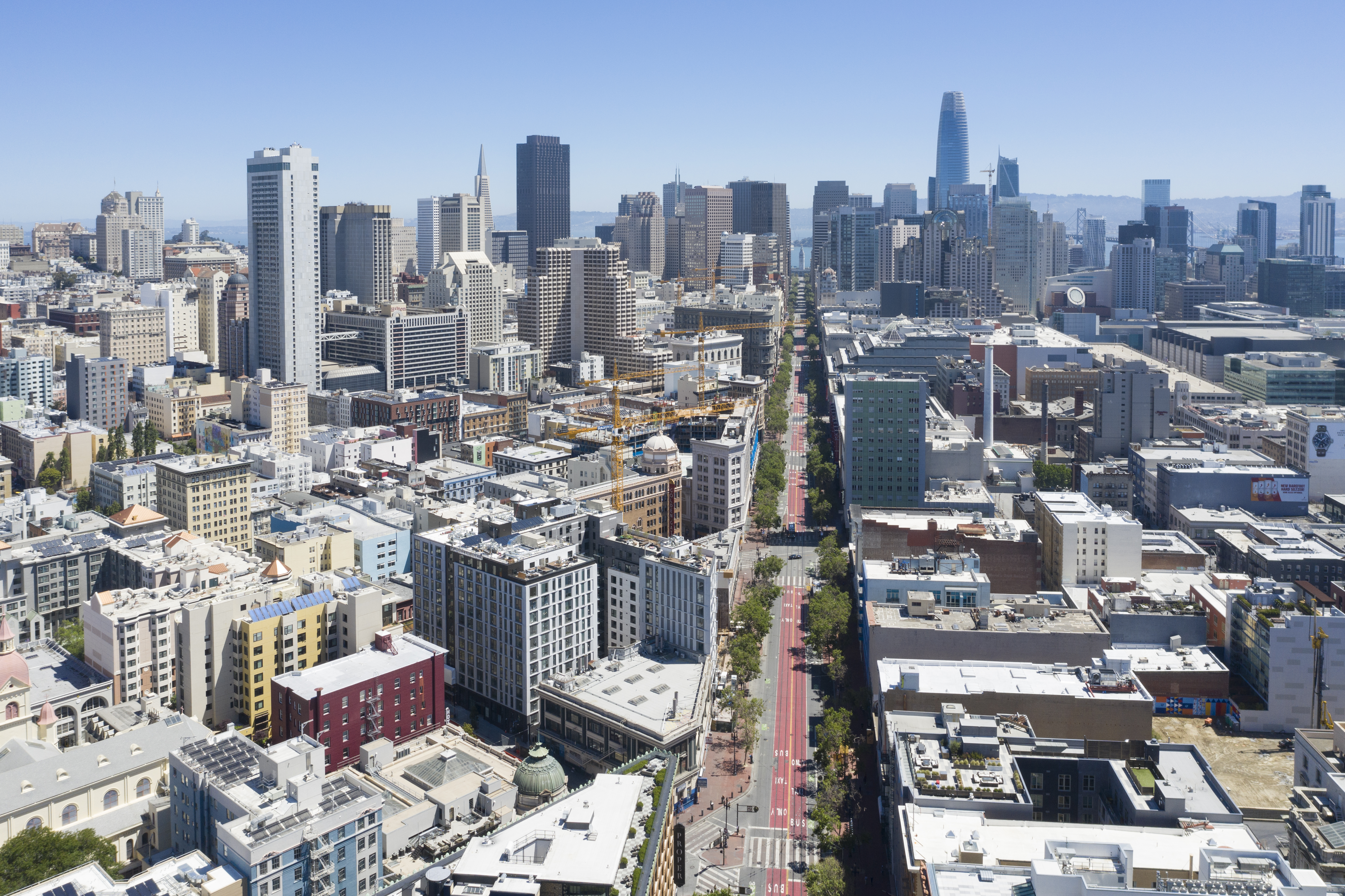
Market Street, San Francisco, on Memorial Day 2020

The Bay Area public health response to the pandemic was coordinated through the Association of Bay Area Health Officers (ABAHO), an organization consisting of the public health officers of 11 counties and two cities that was established in the 1980s to fight the AIDS epidemic in San Francisco. The health officers acted in unison to avoid political pushback. ABAHO is informally divided between the "Big Seven", consisting of Alameda, Contra Costa, Marin, San Mateo, and Santa Clara counties and the cities of Berkeley and San Francisco; and Santa Cruz, Monterey, Napa, San Benito, Sonoma, and Solano counties on the periphery of the Bay Area.

Unlike the shelter-in-place order, orders to wear face coverings such as cloth face masks while in public took effect at different times depending on the jurisdiction.

=== 2020 ===
- February 10: Santa Clara County declares a local health emergency. At the time, there were two confirmed cases of COVID-19 in the county and no known community transmission.
- February 25: San Francisco Mayor London Breed declares a state of emergency that would allow city officials to assemble resources and personnel to expedite emergency measures in the event of a potential coronavirus case in the city.
- March 9: Santa Clara County bans public gatherings of more than 1,000 people. Over the next few days, the county expands the bans to cover all gatherings, and closes all bars and pubs.
- March 16: The "Big Seven" public health departments issued a joint shelter-in-place order, legally requiring all non-essential businesses to close and residents to stay at home except for essential needs, effective March 17. It was the first such order in the mainland United States, coming a day after Puerto Rico went into lockdown.
- March 17: The March 16 stay-at-home order is adopted by the remaining Bay Area county health departments. Santa Clara County has enforced its shelter-in-place order with one of the strictest interpretations in the state. The orders were timed to preempt Saint Patrick's Day celebrations.
- March 30: The "Big Seven" health officers extend the shelter-in-place order to May 3, easing some restrictions on outdoor activity.
- April 13: Sonoma County issues a mask mandate effective April 17.
- April 29: The shelter-in-place order is extended again to May 31.
- May 14: San Benito County meets the California Department of Public Health's criteria to resume dine-in service at restaurants as part of phase 2 of Governor Gavin Newsom's statewide reopening plan.
- May 15: San Mateo County issues a new shelter-in-place order ahead of the Bay Area-wide order that expired on May 31. The county's order allowed nonessential retail and other businesses to offer curbside pickup service. This order, which aligned with phase 2 of the state reopening plan, marked the first departure from the unified front that Bay Area health officials had maintained until then.
- May 18: Despite initial reservations by Contra Costa and Santa Clara county health officials, they and their counterparts in Alameda County, Berkeley, Marin County, and San Francisco issue a joint order on that implemented phase 2 reopening. Napa, Santa Cruz, Solano, and Sonoma counties were also moving forward with phase 2.
- July 15: The San Francisco Zoo reopens to the general public with reservations required.
- July 22: University of California-Berkeley Botanical Gardens reopens to the general public with reservations required.
- August 31: The statewide Blueprint for a Safer Economy reopening plan comes into effect. Napa and San Francisco Counties are at Substantial, while all other Bay Area counties are at Widespread. Napa County directly follows the state's reopening guidelines while San Francisco delays the reopening of businesses.
- September 1: San Francisco allows personal care services and indoor malls to reopen.
- September 14: San Francisco allows indoor nail salons, piercing shops, tattoo parlors, and indoor fitness/dance/yoga studios to reopen.
- September 21: San Francisco allows museums/zoos/aquariums and elementary schools to reopen. Elementary schools in San Francisco Unified School District remain closed.
- September 22: Alameda, San Mateo, and Solano Counties are upgraded from Widespread to Substantial.
  - Alameda County delays the reopening of businesses.
  - San Mateo and Solano Counties directly follow the state's reopening guildines.
  - The de Young Museum reopens to members with reservations required. Several sections remain closed.
- September 25:
  - The de Young Museum reopens to the general public with reservations required.
  - Alameda County allows nail salons to reopen.
- September 30: San Francisco allows indoor dining and places of worship to reopen.
- October 7: San Francisco allows movie theaters to reopen without concessions.
  - The National Association of Theatre Owners of California/Nevada stated that their cinemas in San Francisco would remain closed due to the concessions ban, as it "makes it economically impossible for our members to reopen and significantly limits the moviegoing experience for our audiences."
- October 13:
  - The California Academy of Sciences in Golden Gate Park reopens to members with reservations required. Exhibits and spaces with a high degree of interactivity or where it is difficult to maintain physical distance remain closed.
  - October 22: The California Academy of Sciences reopens to the general public with reservations required. Certain exhibits remain closed.
- October 23: Alameda County allows places of worship and cultural ceremonies, indoor dining, movie theaters, bowling alleys, and climbing walls to reopen. The county also allows indoor retailers and shopping centers to expand their capacity from 25% to 50% and fitness/dance/yoga studios to expand their capacity from 10% to 25%.
- October 27: San Francisco allows climbing walls and offices of non-essential businesses to reopen. The city also allows fitness/dance/yoga studios to expand their indoor capacity from 10% to 25%.
- November 3: San Francisco allows swimming pools and bowling alleys to reopen. The city also allows places of worship, museums/zoos/aquariums, indoor dining, and movie theaters to expand their indoor capacity from 25% to 50%.
- November 9: Alameda County allows middle schools and high schools to reopen.
- December 1: Schools in Piedmont Unified School District reopen for Grades K–2.
- December 6:
  - 10:00 p.m.: Contra Costa, San Francisco, and Santa Clara Counties, as well as the City of Berkeley, preemptively implement the state's December 3 regional stay-at-home order.
  - 11:59 p.m.: The regional stay-at-home order goes into effect for the San Joaquin Valley region, which includes San Benito County.
- December 16: San Mateo becomes the final Bay Area county to ban outdoor dining
- December 17: 11:59 p.m.: The regional stay-at-home order goes into effect for the Bay Area region, which includes all ABAHO counties excluding San Benito County.

=== 2021 ===
- January 25: The regional stay-at-home order is lifted statewide.
- February 23: Marin and San Mateo become the first Bay Area counties since early December to leave the purple tier, being upgraded from Widespread to Substantial
- March 16: San Mateo becomes the first Bay Area county since mid-November to enter the orange tier, being upgraded from Substantial to Moderate
- June 15: BSE system ended statewide.
- August 2: The counties of Alameda, Contra Costa, Marin, San Francisco, San Mateo, and Santa Clara (as well as the City of Berkeley) re-introduce a mask mandate for all persons regardless of vaccination status.
- August 12: San Francisco becomes the first major city in the U.S. to require proof of vaccination for customers of restaurants, bars, and gyms.
- September 2: Berkeley announces that it will require proof of vaccination customers of restaurants, bars, and gyms.
- September 23: Oakland Unified School District announces a vaccine mandate for all students aged 12+.
- September 29: Santa Cruz County lifts its indoor mask mandate.
- October 7: San Francisco announces that it will lift its mask mandate, effective October 15, for gatherings of under 100 people where everyone is vaccinated.
- October 8: Marin County announces the same modifications to its mask mandate as San Francisco, effective October 15.
- October 13: San Francisco begins mandating vaccination for workers of restaurants, bars, and gyms.
- October 30: Marin County announces an end to its indoor mask mandate, effective November 1.

=== 2022 ===
- January 27: San Francisco announces that it will lift its indoor mask mandate if everyone has received a booster dose of the vaccine, effective February 1.
- February 20: Point Bonita Lighthouse, located in the Marin Headlands near Sausalito, resumes tours for the first time after two years of closure due to the COVID-19 pandemic.

== Military response ==
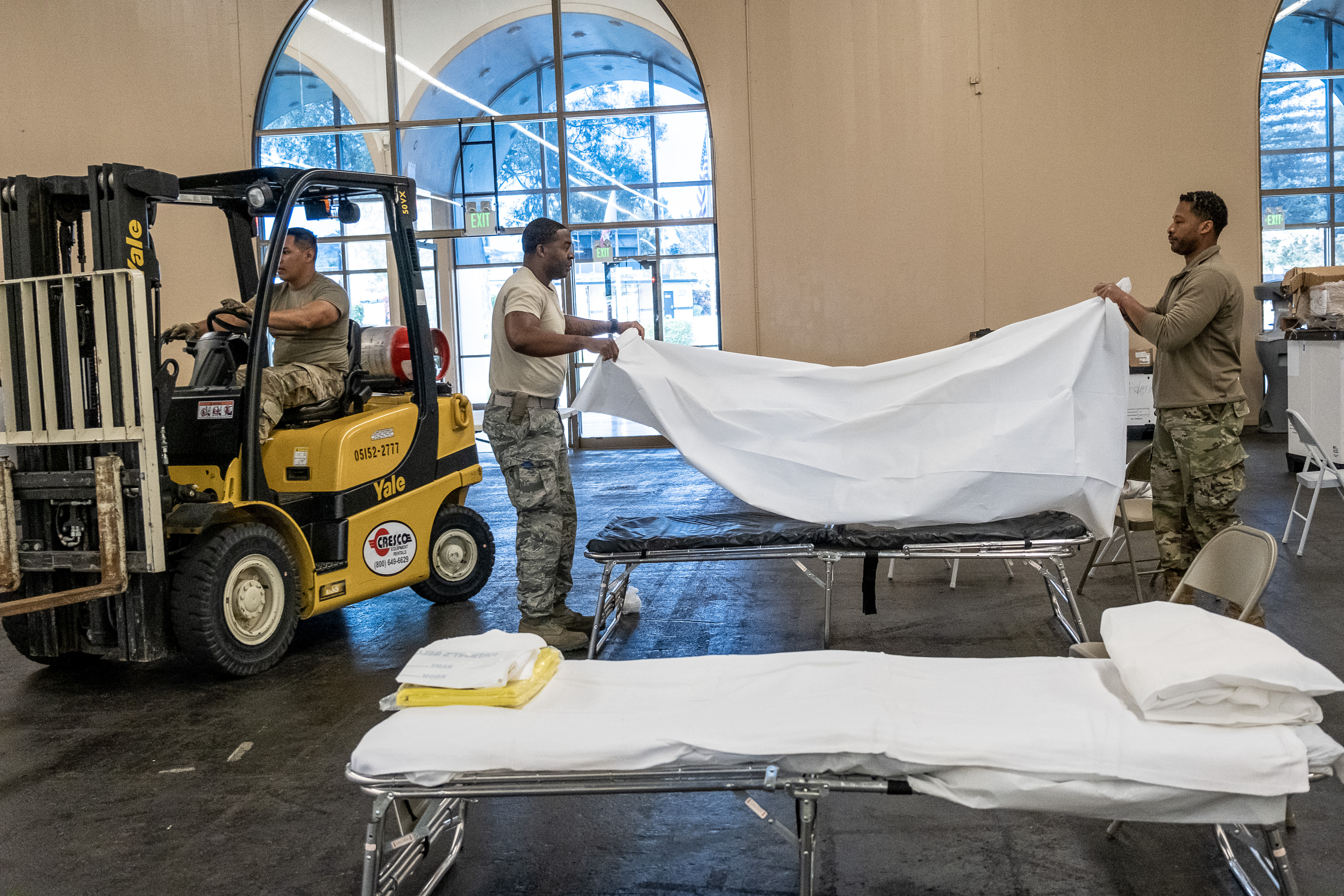
California National Guard staff set up a Federal Medical Station at the San Mateo County Event Center.

The California National Guard and California State Guard activated medical units in the Bay Area to assist local and state government agencies in their COVID-19 response.

In the Bay Area, the California Air National Guard has set up Federal Medical Stations at the Santa Clara Convention Center in Santa Clara (known as the Field Respite Center), the San Mateo County Event Center in San Mateo, and Craneway Pavilion in Richmond. The temporary field hospitals, which are managed by the Strategic National Stockpile Division of the United States Department of Health and Human Services, can receive noncritical patients from local hospitals for convalescent care. The Santa Clara location was converted on March 21 and admitted its first two patients on April 5. The Air National Guard converted the San Mateo location on April 1 and the Richmond location the following day.

== Community and academic response ==
The Innovative Genomics Institute at the University of California, Berkeley, headed by Dr. Jennifer Doudna converted the genomic-editing research laboratory to run COVID-19 tests. Despite a widespread need for COVID testing, doctors and hospitals were hesitant to use the newly set up labs in favor of major commercial laboratories like LabCorp and Quest.

== Economic impact ==
=== Unemployment ===
As in other parts of California and the United States, the Bay Area has experienced a dramatic increase in unemployment as a result of voluntary and mandatory social distancing measures. In April 2020, unemployment in the Bay Area increased by 555,100 residents or 13.7% month over month, including a 15.1% increase in private-sector job losses.

Unemployment has affected the Bay Area unevenly from one area or industry to another. Despite layoffs by startups in March and April, job losses in the technology industry increased by only 4.1%, compared to an increase by more than 50% in the hospitality industry. Due to the technology industry's dominance in Santa Clara County known as Silicon Valley, unemployment increased by only 11.2% there in April, compared to 14.6% in the East Bay and 14.4% in San Francisco and San Mateo County. In San Francisco, which is relatively dependent on tourism, over 100,000 residents, or about one-ninth of the city's population, filed for unemployment benefits during the pandemic.

As of May 13, 2020, large Bay Area employers have collectively sent the state Employment Development Department about 24,700 WARN notices about proposed mass layoffs, furloughs, or facility closures.

=== Construction ===
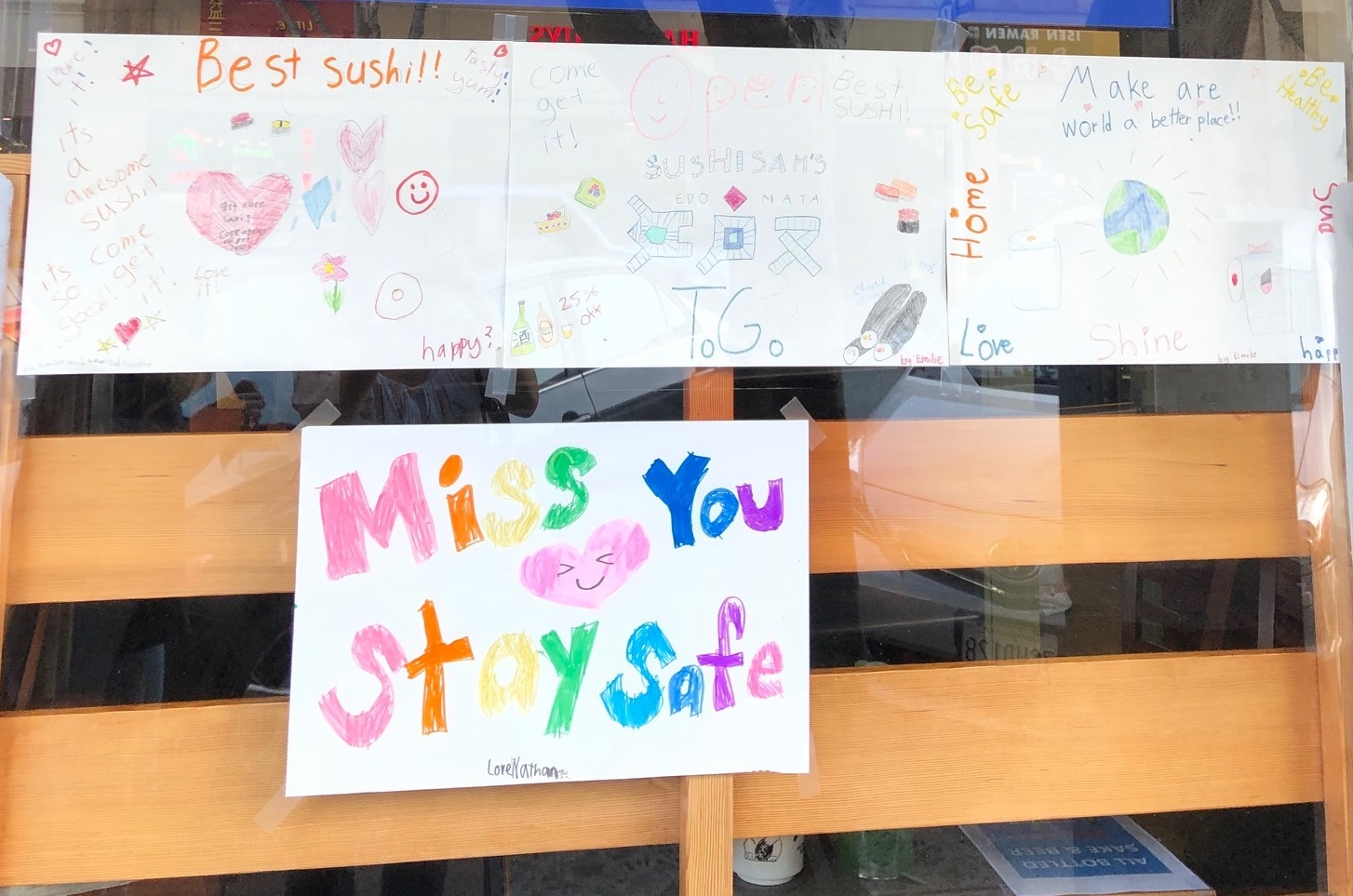
Signs of community support in front of the popular Sushi Sam's restaurant in San Mateo posted in May 2020

Bay Area counties' strict interpretations of shelter-in-place orders halted most residential and commercial construction projects. Some construction projects resumed in mid-May.

=== Government ===
San Francisco has tentatively projected that its deficit will double to between $1.1 billion and $1.7 billion over fiscal years 2020 and 2021.

Redwood City expects to have a balanced budget in 2020 but a $10 million deficit in 2021.

As of May 2020, San Jose projects a $45 million deficit for fiscal year 2019–20 and a $71.6 million deficit for 2020–21, revised downward from a $500,000 surplus projected in 2019. The impact will be significantly worse than either the dot-com bust or the Great Recession. Palo Alto projected a $40 million loss in revenue.

Oakland projected an $80 million deficit over 14 months and has laid off part-time employees. Berkeley projected a $2.6 million deficit in 2020 and a $25.2 million deficit in 2021.

Richmond projected a $7 million deficit in 2020 and a $27 million deficit in 2021. Walnut Creek closed a $13 million budget gap in 2020 but expects a $12 million deficit in 2021.

Vallejo projected a $13 million deficit.

Napa projected a $10 million deficit in 2020 and a deficit from $15 million to $20 million in 2021.

Santa Rosa tapped its reserves to close a $12 million budget gap in 2020 but expects a $20 million deficit in 2021.

Sausalito expects a $1.6 million deficit for fiscal year 2019–20 and a $4.9 million deficit for 2020–21.

=== Manufacturing ===
Some major Bay Area manufacturers, such as Lockheed Martin in Sunnyvale and Chevron Corporation in San Ramon, have been exempted from shelter-in-place orders as essential businesses. However, the Tesla Factory in Fremont was not exempted and was forced to halt production, resulting in the furlough of nearly 11,100 employees. On May 11, Tesla resumed manufacturing operations at the factory despite an Alameda County order allowing only minimum basic operations.

=== Retail and foodservice ===
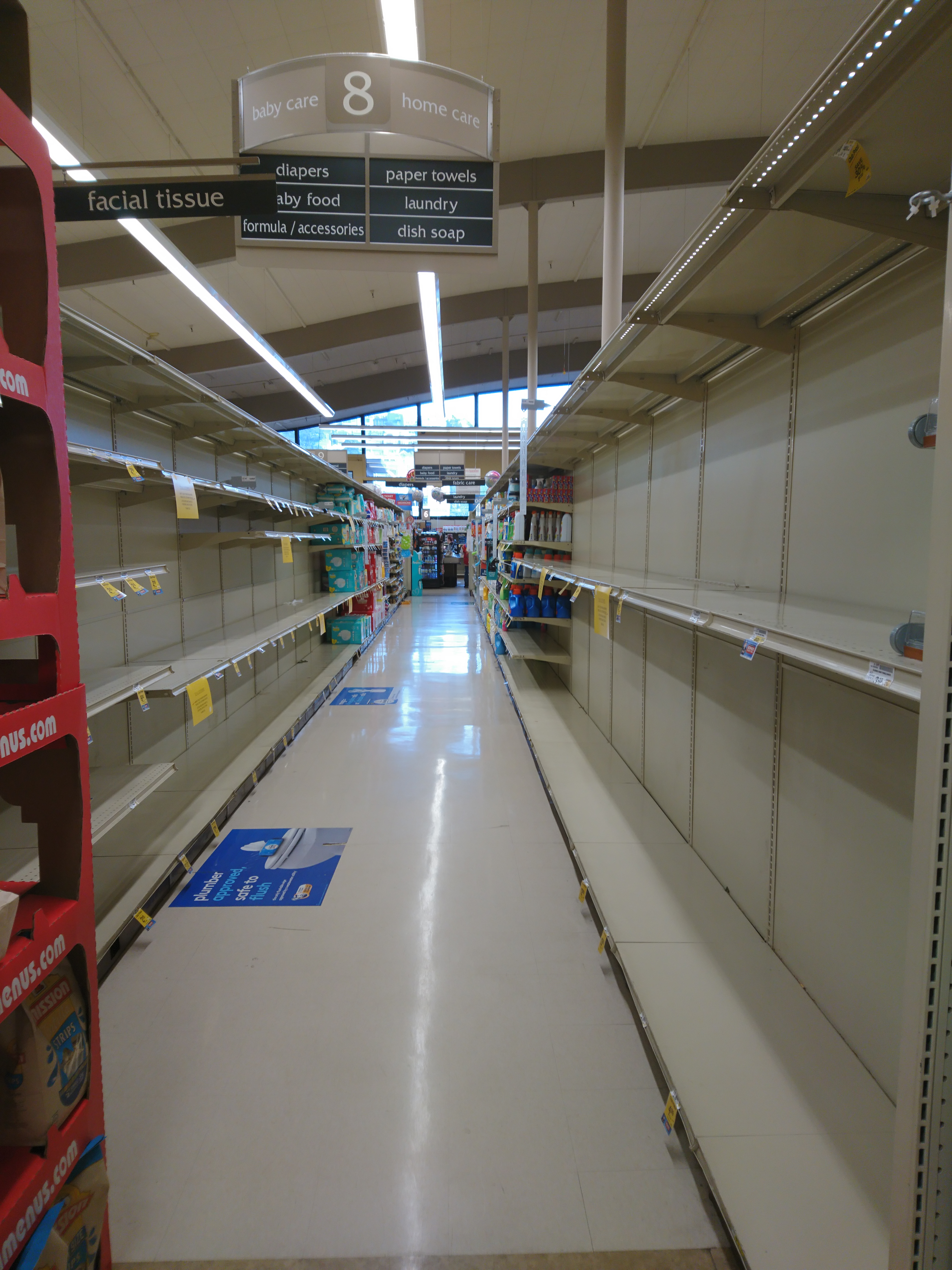
Empty shelves at a San Francisco Safeway on March 17, the day after the shelter-in-place order took effect

The March 13 announcement of a shelter-in-place order triggered a wave of panic buying throughout the region.

By April, the Consumer Price Index for the San Francisco area (Alameda, Contra Costa, and Marin counties and San Francisco) fell by 0.5% compared to February, a 1.1% rise year over year. By category, retail prices rose by 14.5% year over year for meat, 9.6% for dairy, 6.7% for food at home (bought in stores), and 0.6% for alcohol. Retail prices fell by 28.4% for regular unleaded gas, 27.6% year over year for motor fuel in general, 12% for clothing, and 7.8% for transportation.

Of the San Jose Downtown Association's more than 1,600 member businesses, 83% are temporarily or permanently closed, 9% are operating with reduced service, and 8% are fully operational as of mid-May.

Due to the pandemic, the Pleasanton-based Specialty's bakery-café chain, which specialized in corporate catering, permanently closed its more than 50 locations on May 19, 2020, after 33 years in business. San Jose–based Fry's Electronics also blamed the pandemic for its closure on February 24, 2021.

=== Technology ===
The technology industry was not as heavily impacted by stay-at-home orders as the leisure and hospitality industries. Demand for Bay Area–based teleconferencing and e-commerce services increased significantly during the pandemic. According to San Jose–based Zoom Video Communications, usage of its Zoom software rose to 300 million active users, compared to about 10 million per day in December 2019.

By early March, many large technology companies began encouraging or requiring employees to remote work. These social distancing measures, which predated mandatory shelter-in-place orders, are credited with helping to lessen the initial impact of the pandemic.

On May 15, the Bay Area Council released a survey finding that 17.9% of companies planned to keep their employees remote working on a permanent basis, while 89.3% planned to remain a partially remote workforce. Facebook, Square, Inc., Google and Twitter announced permanent or extended remote work policies.

As of June 2020, Lyft, Yelp, IBM, and LendingClub disclosed a combined total of 1,000 planned layoffs in the Bay Area.

Technology conferences that are normally held in Bay Area cities have been canceled, postponed, or replaced by Internet streaming events, including:

- Apple Worldwide Developers Conference – moved online
- Dreamforce (San Francisco's largest conference) – moved online
- Facebook F8 – canceled
- Game Developers Conference – postponed
- Google Cloud Next – canceled
- Google I/O – canceled
- GPU Technology Conference – moved online
- VMworld – moved online

The RSA Conference was held in February as scheduled, but Verizon, AT&T, and IBM pulled out of the conference on February 21, as concerns began to grow about the pandemic.

=== Tourism ===
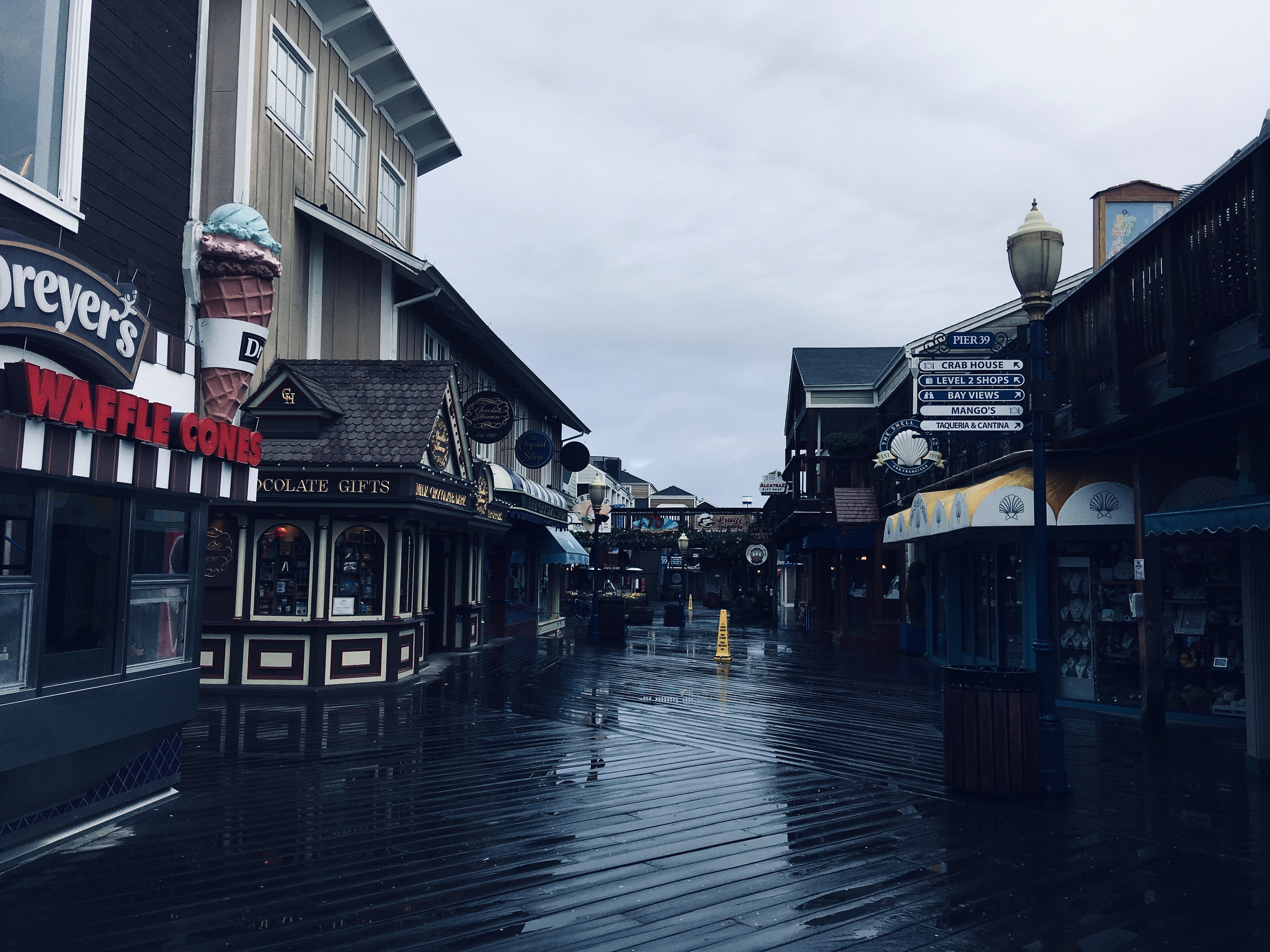
A deserted Pier 39 in San Francisco

San Francisco's economy is heavily dependent on tourism, which normally employs 90,000 people and generates more tax revenue than any other industry in the city. International tourism normally accounts for 64% of San Francisco's tourism spending but has largely disappeared during the pandemic. San Francisco's destination marketing organization is projecting visitor volume to recover to 18.4 million for 2021, still down 30 percent to 2019. Gradual improvement will be driven primarily by domestic visitation. International tourism will take much longer to recover.

== Social impact ==
=== Education ===
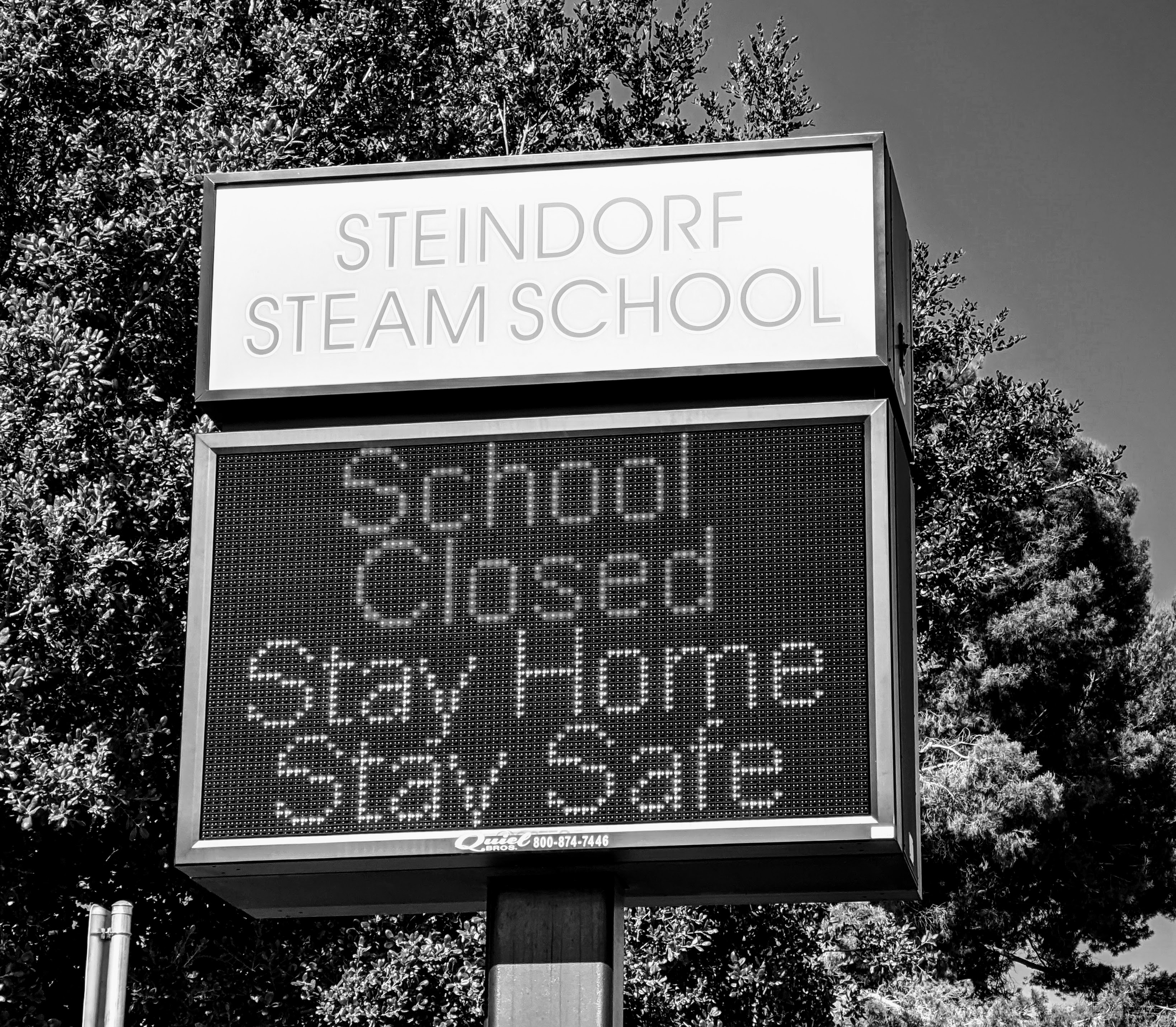
A closed elementary school in San Jose

On April 1, school superintendents in Santa Clara and San Mateo counties announced that in-person classes would not resume during the 2019–20 school year.

Many Bay Area colleges and universities have announced plans for instruction in response to the pandemic:

Educational institutions by 2020–21 school year reopening plans
Institution	Fall 2020	Spring 2021
Berkeley City College	most classes online	Unknown
California College of the Arts	mixture of online and in-person classes with distance learning options for some first-year undergraduates	Unknown
California State University, East Bay	most classes online	Unknown
California State University Maritime Academy	most classes online	Unknown
California State University, Monterey Bay	most classes online	Unknown
Cañada College	most classes online	Unknown
City College of San Francisco	online	Unknown
College of Alameda	most classes online	Unknown
College of San Mateo	most classes online	Unknown
Contra Costa College	online	Unknown
The Culinary Institute of America at Greystone	in person	Unknown
De Anza College	most classes online	Unknown
Diablo Valley College	online	Unknown
Dominican University of California	in person	Unknown
Evergreen Valley College	online	Unknown
Foothill College	online	Unknown
Holy Names University	in person	Unknown
Laney College	most classes online	Unknown
Los Medanos College	online	Unknown
Menlo College	in person, but start of fall semester delayed	Unknown
Merritt College	most classes online	Unknown
Notre Dame de Namur University	new undergraduate admissions suspended	Unknown
Pacific School of Religion	in person, but introducing distance learning options	Unknown
Presidio Graduate School	resuming online instruction with monthly in-person residencies	Unknown
Saint Mary's College of California	in person	Unknown
San Francisco State University	most classes online	Unknown
San Jose City College	online	Unknown
San Jose State University	most classes online	Unknown
Santa Clara University	mixture of in-person and online classes	Unknown
Santa Rosa Junior College	most classes online	Unknown
Skyline College	most classes online	Unknown
Sonoma State University	most classes online	Unknown
Stanford University	most classes online, all single dormitory rooms	Unknown
Starr King School for the Ministry	most classes online	Unknown
University of California, Berkeley	some or all classes online	Unknown
University of the Pacific	in person	Unknown
University of San Francisco	most classes online	most classes online
William Jessup University	in person	Unknown

On February 15, 2022, three commissioners of the San Francisco Board of Education were recalled in the city's first recall election in 39 years. The school board's decision to keep schools closed longer than other major school districts was cited as a factor in the successful recall effort.

=== Hunger ===
Over the first 10 weeks since the shelter-in-place order was issued, Bay Area food banks have seen demand double and calls increase a thousandfold. According to Second Harvest of Silicon Valley, the number of residents needing food distribution increased 40% from 270,000 in February to 370,000 in April. The Alameda County Community Food Bank has distributed over a million of pounds of food a week and seen lines stretching more than 1,000 cars in a day.

=== Housing ===
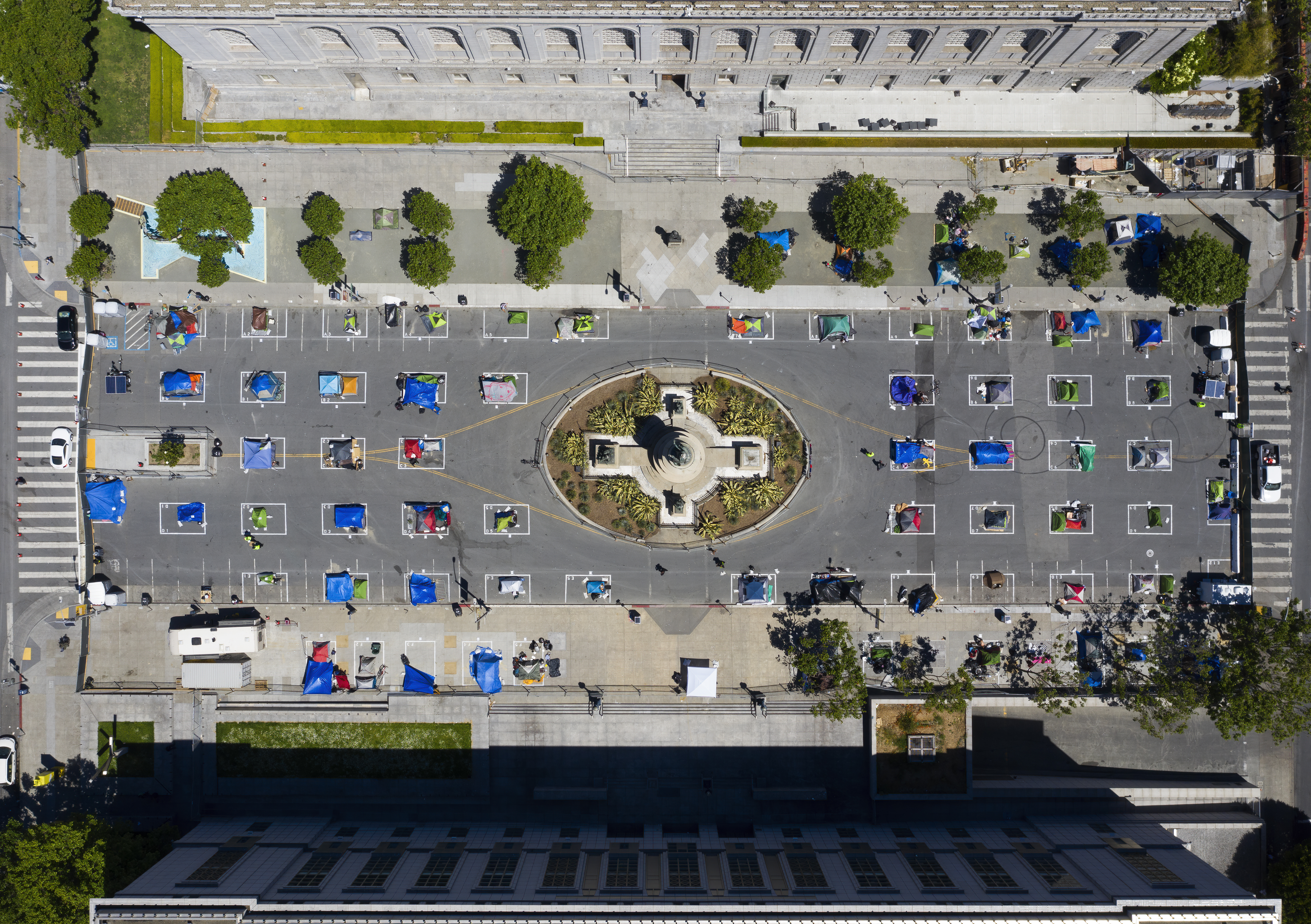
A "safe sleeping village" at San Francisco's Civic Center organized tents into an evenly spaced grid as a safer alternative to the city's usual homeless encampments.

An ongoing housing shortage in California has increased housing costs dramatically and contributed to the Bay Area's high rates of homelessness. Homeless shelters have been major sites of community transmission. On April 10, 70 of 144 occupants of one homeless shelter in San Francisco were confirmed to have COVID-19.

By April, the number of tents and makeshift structures increased by 71% over the previous quarter in San Francisco and by 285% in the Tenderloin neighborhood specifically. As of May 3, 2020, San Francisco has leased 2,700 hotel rooms as emergency housing for at-risk homeless people and first responders. Although the state government has reserved hotel rooms throughout the state for similar purposes, homeless people have come to the city from other areas looking for hotel rooms, prompting Mayor London Breed to focus the city's emergency housing resources on local homeless people.

There are nearly 6,200 homeless people in San Jose, most of them Hispanic or African American. At least 2,500 are considered at high risk for infection due to underlying health conditions. The city added more than 400 temporary beds at homeless shelters, including a temporary shelter near the San Jose Convention Center. In mid-March, shortly after the shelter-in-place order took effect, the Governor's Office of Emergency Services delivered 104 trailers to a property near Happy Hollow Park & Zoo to use as emergency housing. After repairs, 90 trailers began accepting occupants on May 14.

On March 17, San Jose became one of the first jurisdictions in the U.S. to place a moratorium on evictions, followed by surrounding Santa Clara County, San Francisco, Oakland, and cities across the country.

The following Bay Area jurisdictions have placed moratoria on evictions:

- Alameda County – until December 31 or until the local health emergency expires, whichever comes later
  - Fremont – until 30 days after the local health emergency expires
  - Hayward – until September 30
  - Oakland – until August 31
- Contra Costa County – until September 30
  - Concord – until September 30
  - Richmond – until September 30
- San Francisco – until August 31
- San Mateo County – until August 31
  - San Mateo – for commercial tenants until the local health emergency expires
- Santa Clara County – until August 31
  - Mountain View – until August 31
  - Palo Alto – until the local health emergency expires
  - San Jose – until August 31
  - Sunnyvale – until the local health emergency expires

San Jose temporarily modified its rent control ordinance to place a moratorium on rent increases through the end of 2020, affecting tens of thousands of apartment buildings and mobile home parks. Oakland also extended a 3.5% limit to rent increases until June 30.

=== Legal system ===
On March 20, Alameda County officials announced that 247 people would be released from Santa Rita Jail in Dublin.

=== Transportation ===
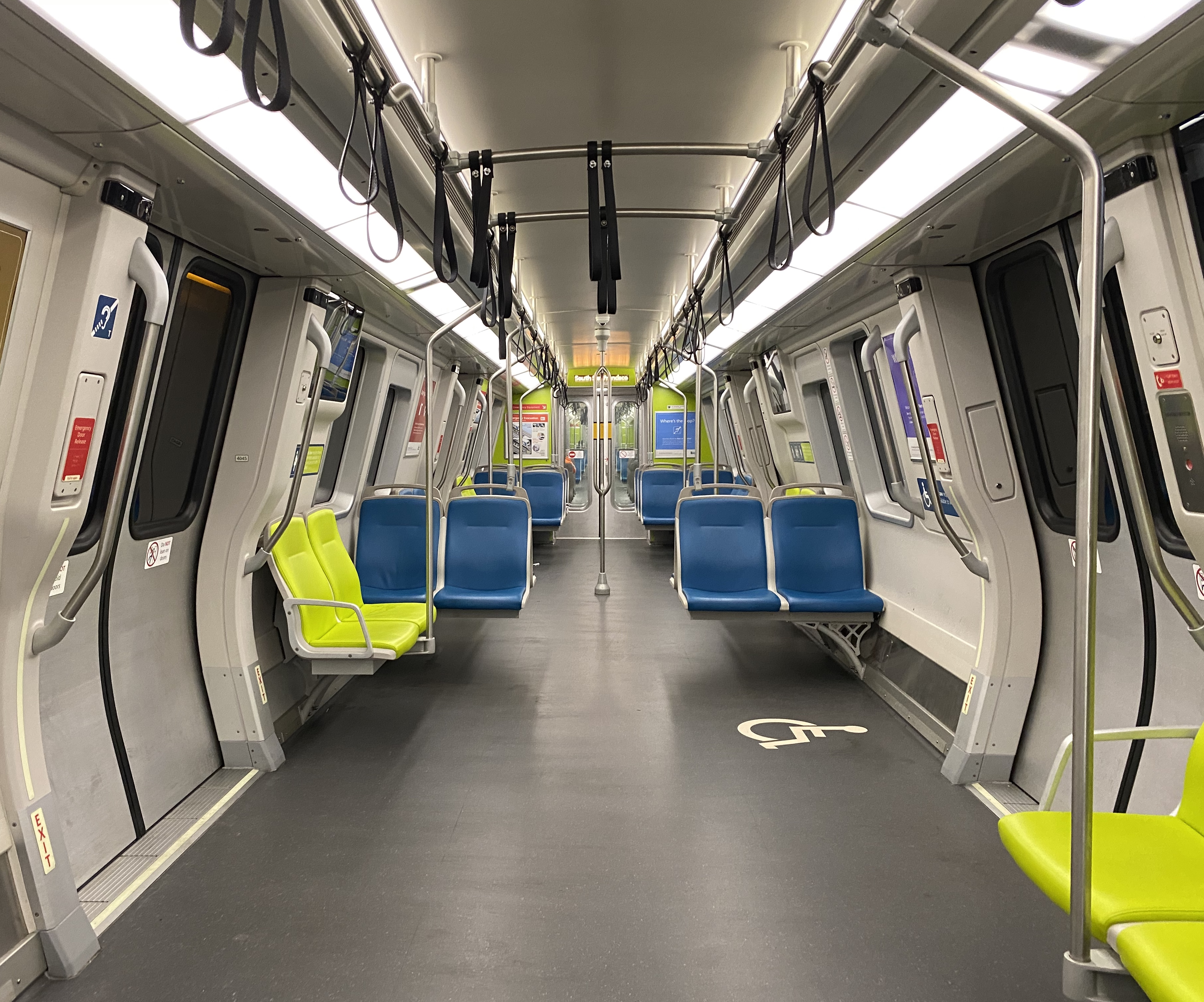
An empty car on the BART Antioch–SFO/Millbrae line on a Friday morning

Beginning March 13, the United States Department of Homeland Security required Americans traveling from the Schengen Area, China, and Iran to enter the U.S. through one of 13 airports, including San Francisco International Airport (SFO). In March, 508,100 passengers traveled through the San Jose International Airport (SJC), down 58.6% year over year, after consistent gains before the pandemic. By the beginning of April, foot traffic at SFO, SJC, and Oakland International Airport had fallen by 73% compared to before the pandemic, according to Foursquare location tracking data.

Public transportation agencies in the Bay Area have lost significant sources of funding from simultaneous, dramatic declines in ridership and sales tax revenue and the suspension of planned fare increases, even as the agencies maintain core service to serve essential workers. The agencies expect to receive $1.3 billion in stimulus funding from the Metropolitan Transportation Commission under the Coronavirus Aid, Relief, and Economic Security Act, with the largest share going to the Bay Area Rapid Transit District and San Francisco Municipal Transportation Agency.

In the first week of the shelter-in-place order, Bay Area Rapid Transit (BART) ridership fell by 87% to 89% of average ridership in February, though it had already begun falling with technology companies' transition to remote work. Ridership in April and early May stayed between 90% and 94% below the baseline average. BART suspended late weekday night service on March 23, 2020, and reduced weekend service on March 28, 2020. Beginning April 8, BART reduced weekday train frequency by half and ran only long train consists to facilitate social distancing. To prepare for commuters' return to BART, the system accelerated its adoption of contactless payment, eliminating paper ticket vending machines in favor of Clipper card vending machines at several stations and expanding its mobile application's parking payment feature to all stations.

Caltrain's ridership dropped by 75% in the first half of March, prior to the Bay Area–wide shelter-in-place order taking effect, then dropped further to only five percent of normal levels, resulting in losses of $9 million per month. Due to low ridership, Caltrain suspended Baby Bullet service on March 13. On March 26, it further reduced weekday service from 92 trains per day to 42, suspending Limited service.

The Peninsula Corridor Joint Powers Board, which operates Caltrain, had been planning to propose a one-eighth-cent sales tax for voter approval later in the year, to provide an estimated $108 million of dedicated funding for the system, which currently relies on rider fares for 70% of its revenue. In July, after the San Francisco Board of Supervisors initially declined to consider the ballot proposal, citing concerns about the system's governance structure, Caltrain officials warned that the agency would run out of operating funds and be forced to suspend service by the end of the year. In August, San Mateo County officials agreed to make Caltrain more independent from SamTrans in exchange for places the sales tax on the ballot. In June 2021, Caltrain announced that electric service would be delayed to late 2024 partly due to supply chain disruptions during the pandemic.

On May 4, the Santa Clara Valley Transportation Authority began requiring every rider to wear a face covering, such as a cloth face mask, to reduce the risk of transmission.

The San Francisco Municipal Railway reduced bus service to core routes and suspended Muni Metro service.

On March 21, state-owned toll bridges in the Bay Area stopped accepting cash in favor of open road tolling via FasTrak and paying by plate. FasTrak also temporarily suspended late fees and collections.

On April 29, Lyft discontinued its electric scooter service in San Jose and Oakland in conjunction with a major round of layoffs. Lyft continued to operate its Bay Wheels bike sharing service.

Casual carpooling ended in March 2020. As of November 2022 it has not resumed.

=== Race relations ===
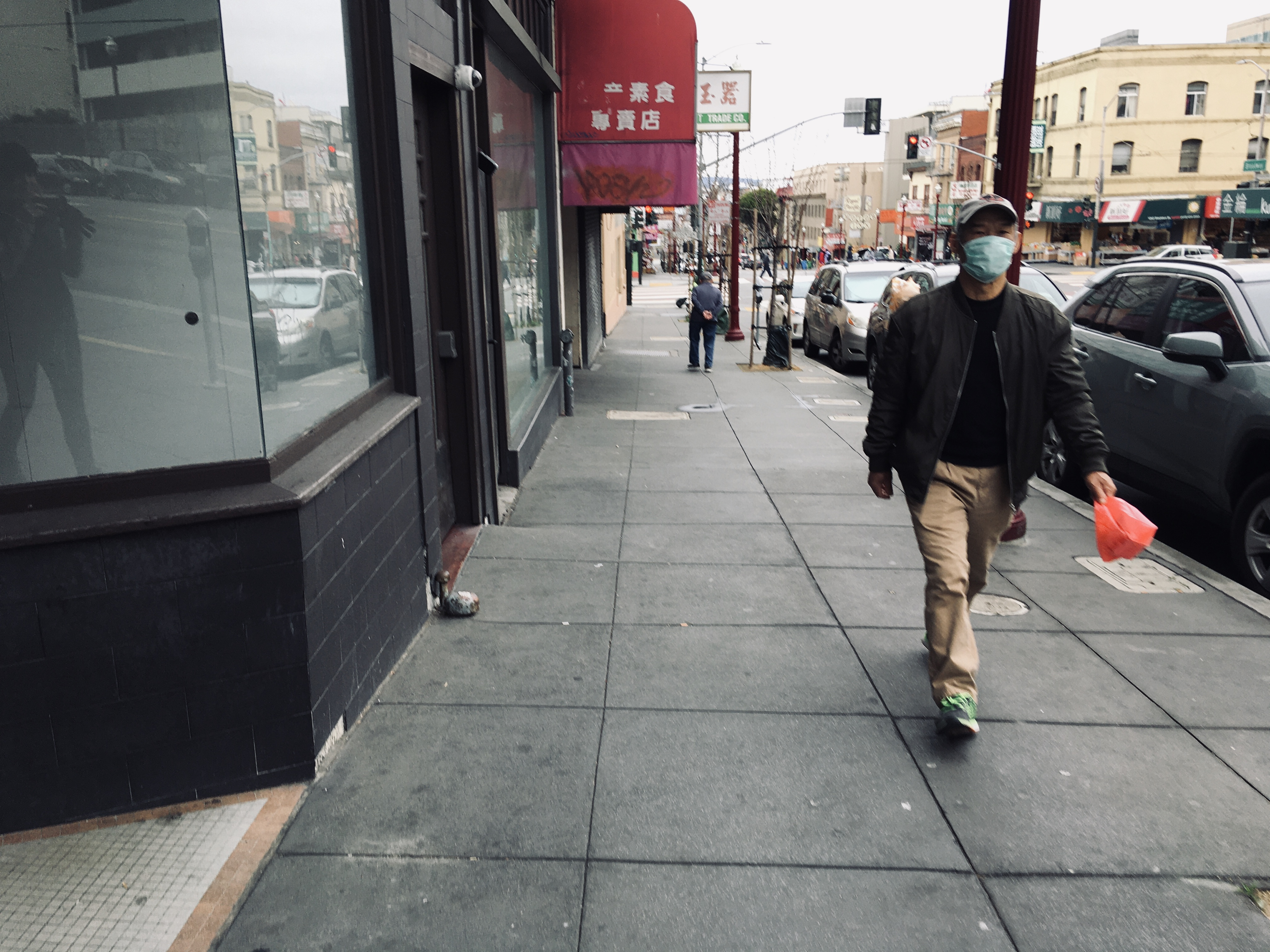
San Francisco's Chinatown under a shelter-in-place order

There have been documented incidents of racism towards Bay Area Asian Pacific Americans.

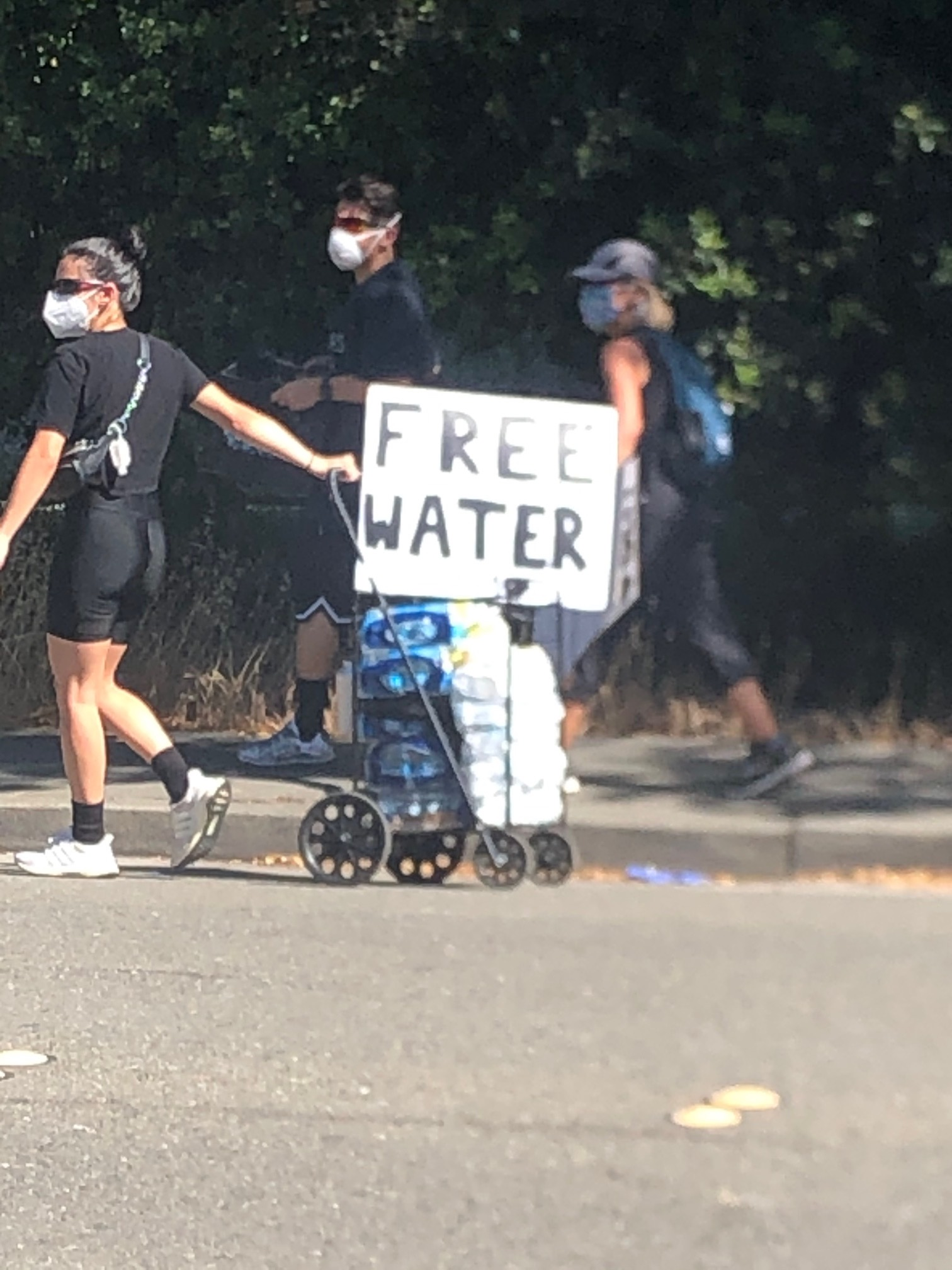
Free water distributed by masked protesters

Officials and community-based organizations expressed concern that fears about COVID-19 were disproportionately affecting local Asian-American businesses. On February 24, House Speaker Nancy Pelosi toured San Francisco's Chinatown to support local shops that had seen declining business since the epidemic began in China.

Several peaceful protests took place in the Bay Area during the pandemic to raise awareness about police brutality. One in San Mateo on June 3, 2020, was attended by hundreds of people. A youth-led protest against police brutality in San Francisco attracted at least 10,000 protesters to the Mission District.

=== Recreation ===
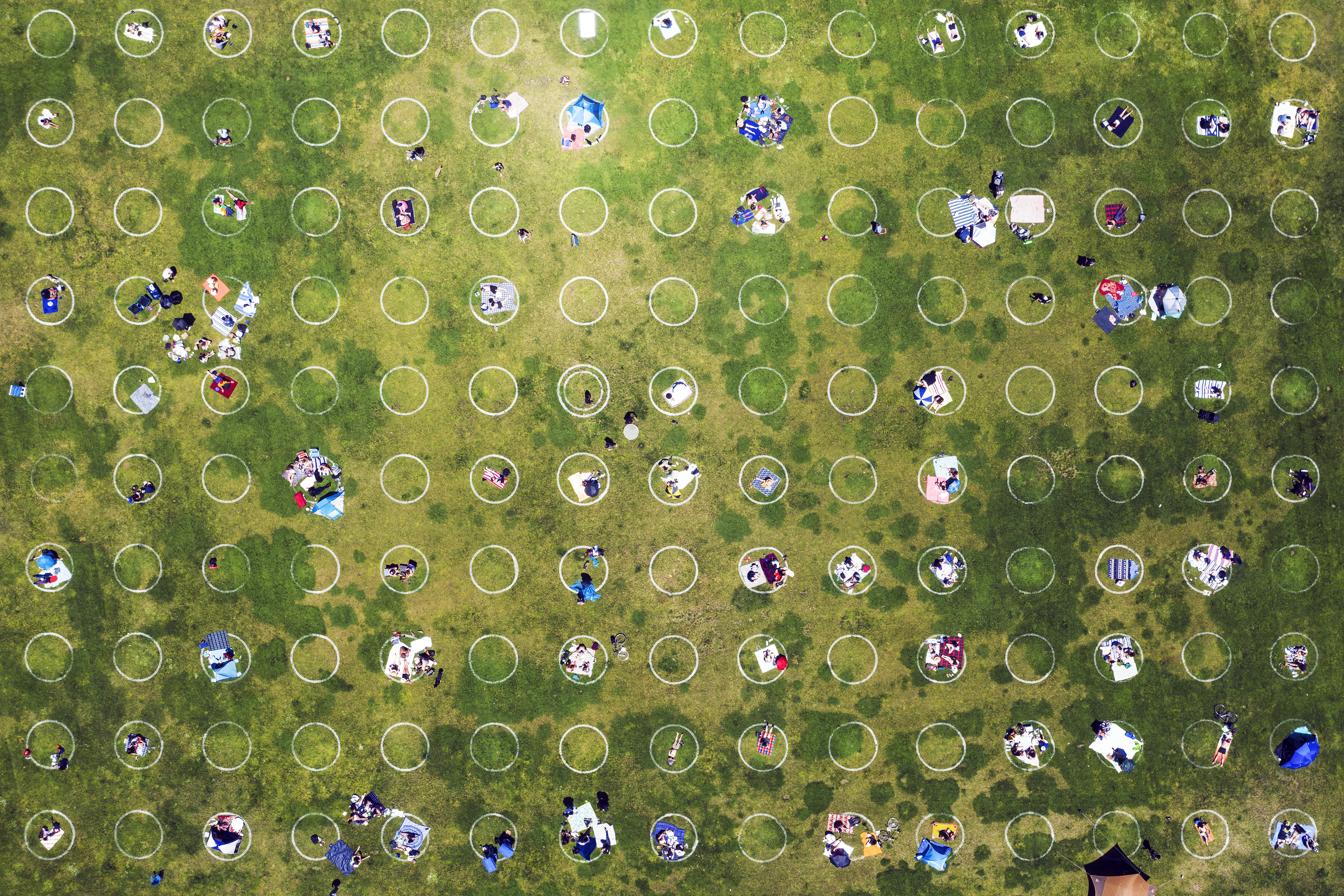
White circles on the grass at Dolores Park on Memorial Day

To promote social distancing during the Memorial Day weekend, the San Francisco Recreation & Parks Department painted a grid of white circles 10 feet (3.0 m) in diameter, spaced 8 feet (2.4 m) apart, on the grass at Mission Dolores Park, Washington Square, and two other city parks. City of Berkeley posted signs with numbers of people allowed on the playgrounds and reminding users to maintain social distancing and limits.

The fifth semiannual Viva CalleSJ street festival in San Jose had been scheduled for May 17 but was replaced with a virtual tour.

=== Religion ===
On March 13, 2020, the Roman Catholic Diocese of San José closed all diocesan schools from until at least April 20. It suspended public Masses and dispensed with the obligation to attend Mass from March 14 until further notice. The Diocese of Oakland also suspended public Masses on March 16, and the Archdiocese of San Francisco and Diocese of Santa Rosa followed suit on March 17. On March 18, the California Catholic Conference of bishops suspended the public celebration of Mass throughout the state until further notice.

On May 23, 2021, the Diocese of Santa Rosa lifted the dispensation from obligation to attend Sunday Mass. The Archdiocese of San Francisco also lifted the dispensation on June 24, followed by the Diocese of Oakland on August 15. On February 8, 2022, the Diocese of San José announced that the dispensation would be lifted effective March 6.

=== Sports ===
After Santa Clara County banned all large gatherings larger than 1,000 people for a three-week period beginning March 11, the San Jose Sharks of the NHL and the Golden State Warriors of the NBA announced that all of their remaining home games of the regular season would be played behind closed doors with no spectators. With their game on March 12 against the Brooklyn Nets, the Warriors were to be the first professional sports team in the United States to play a home game behind closed doors due to the pandemic, before the NBA suspended the season one day prior.

Along with a Sacramento-area school, Archbishop Riordan High School and the Menlo School withdrew from the California Interscholastic Federation (CIF) Northern California championship tournament after their schools were forced to close.

Stanford University announced plans to cut 11 of its 36 varsity sports at the end of the 2020–21 school year, citing a $70 million deficit due to the pandemic.

== Vaccinations ==
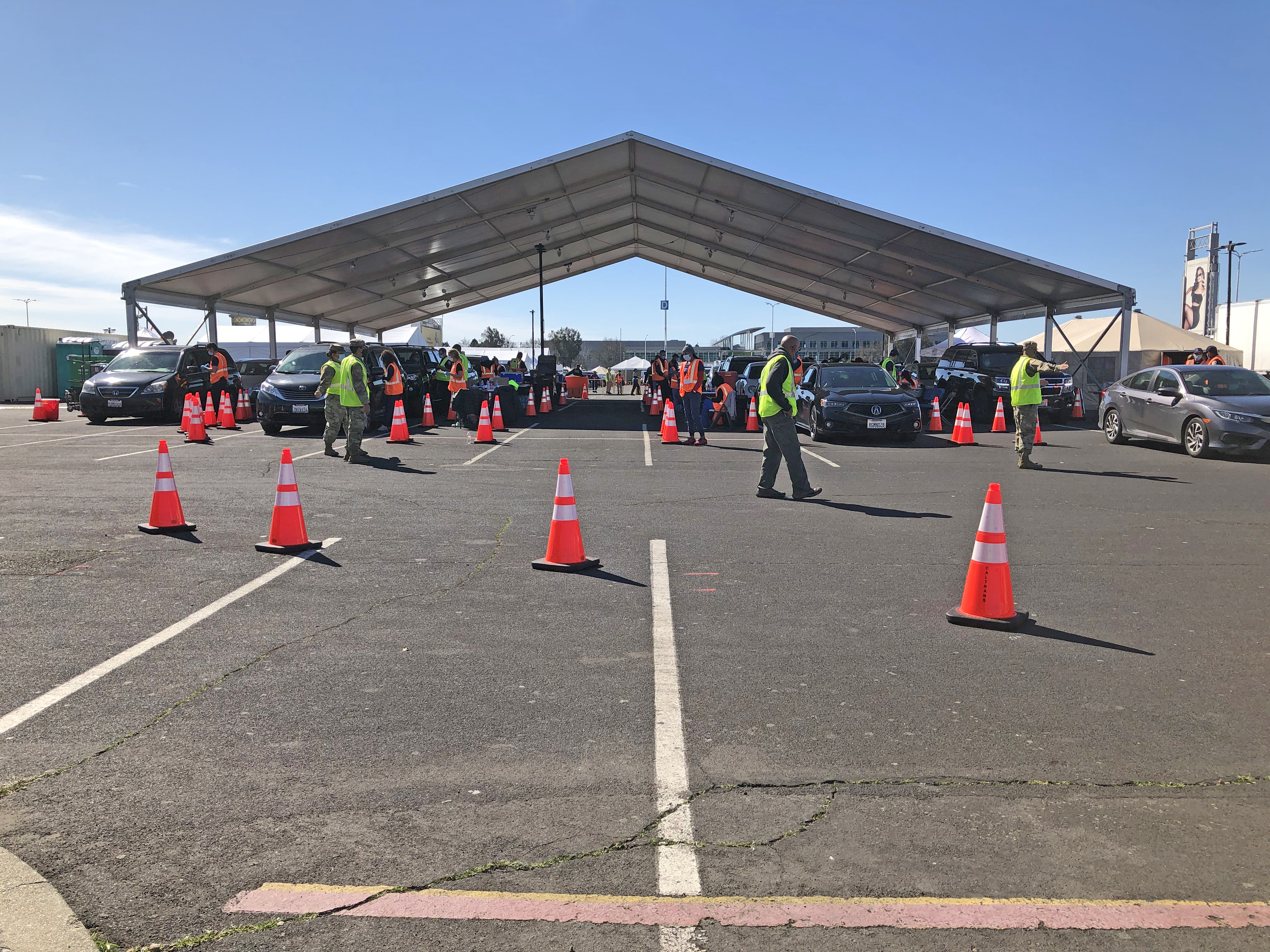
The Oakland Coliseum mass vaccination site in February 2021

Vaccinations in Bay Area up to June 6, 2023
	Vaccinations	Population
	3,947,957	7,739,378
Santa Clara	842,396	1,927,852
Alameda	841,690	1,671,329
Contra Costa	614,689	1,153,526
San Francisco	493,749	881,549
San Mateo	422,406	766,573
Sonoma	283,625	494,336
Solano	185,628	447,643
Marin	179,010	258,826
Napa	84,764	137,744

The first vaccinations in the Bay Area took place on December 15, 2020, at Zuckerberg San Francisco General Hospital after the city received 12,500 doses of the Pfizer vaccine.

Mass vaccination sites were opened across the region in February 2021. The first three mass vaccination sites were located at the Oakland Coliseum, the Moscone Center and City College.

The Santa Clara County Public Health Department administered 1.9 million vaccinations, about a third of all vaccinations in the county, at a cost of $1 billion. At the peak of the pandemic, the department operated one of the largest vaccination sites in the United States, serving about 14,000 patients per day at Levi's Stadium. Other vaccination sites, including those at the Santa Clara County Fairgrounds and San Antonio Shopping Center, are scheduled to operate until the end of the public health emergency on February 28, 2023.

== Environmental impact ==
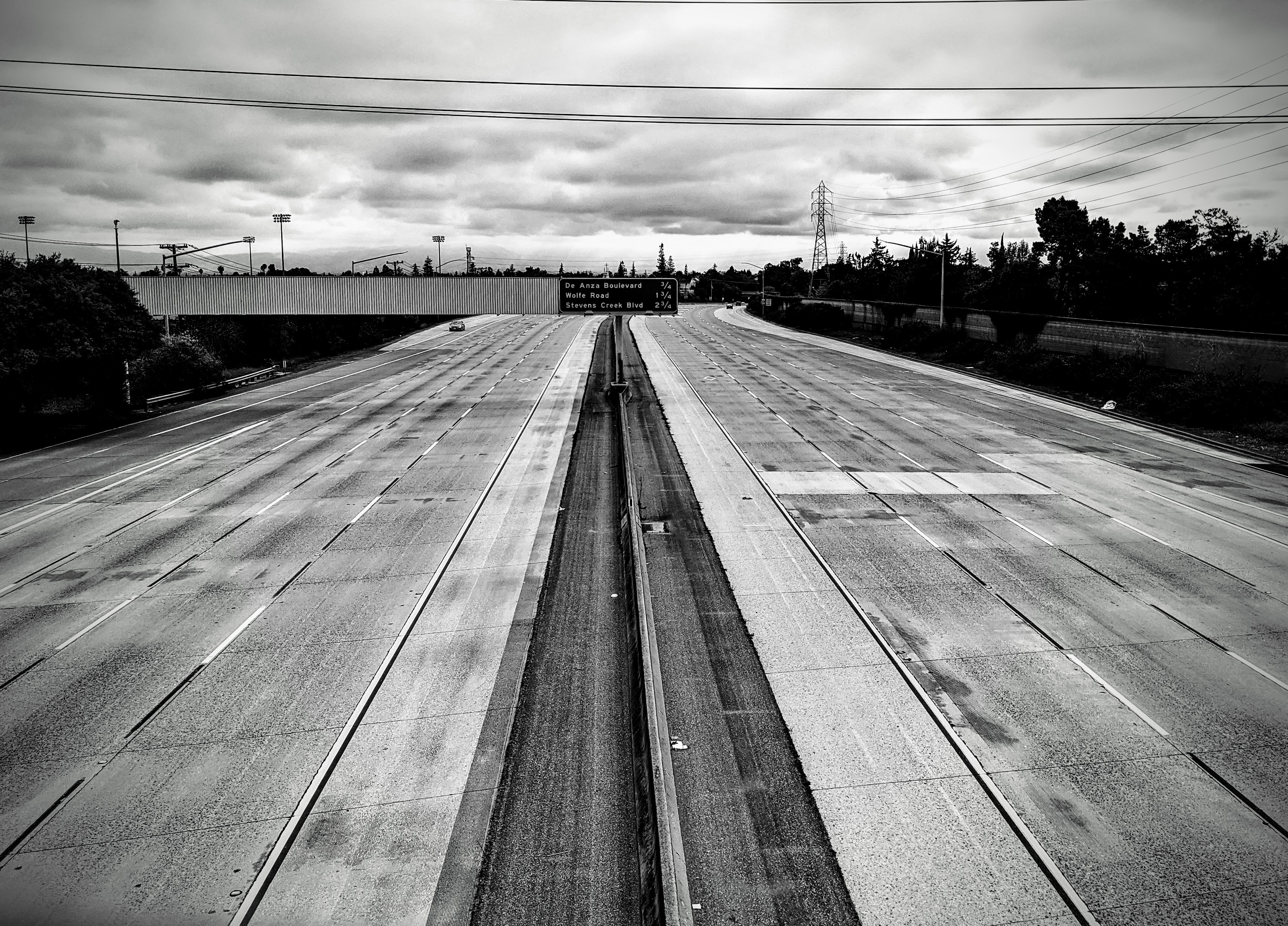
An empty Interstate 280 near SR 85 in Cupertino at 9:30 a.m., during the Friday morning rush hour

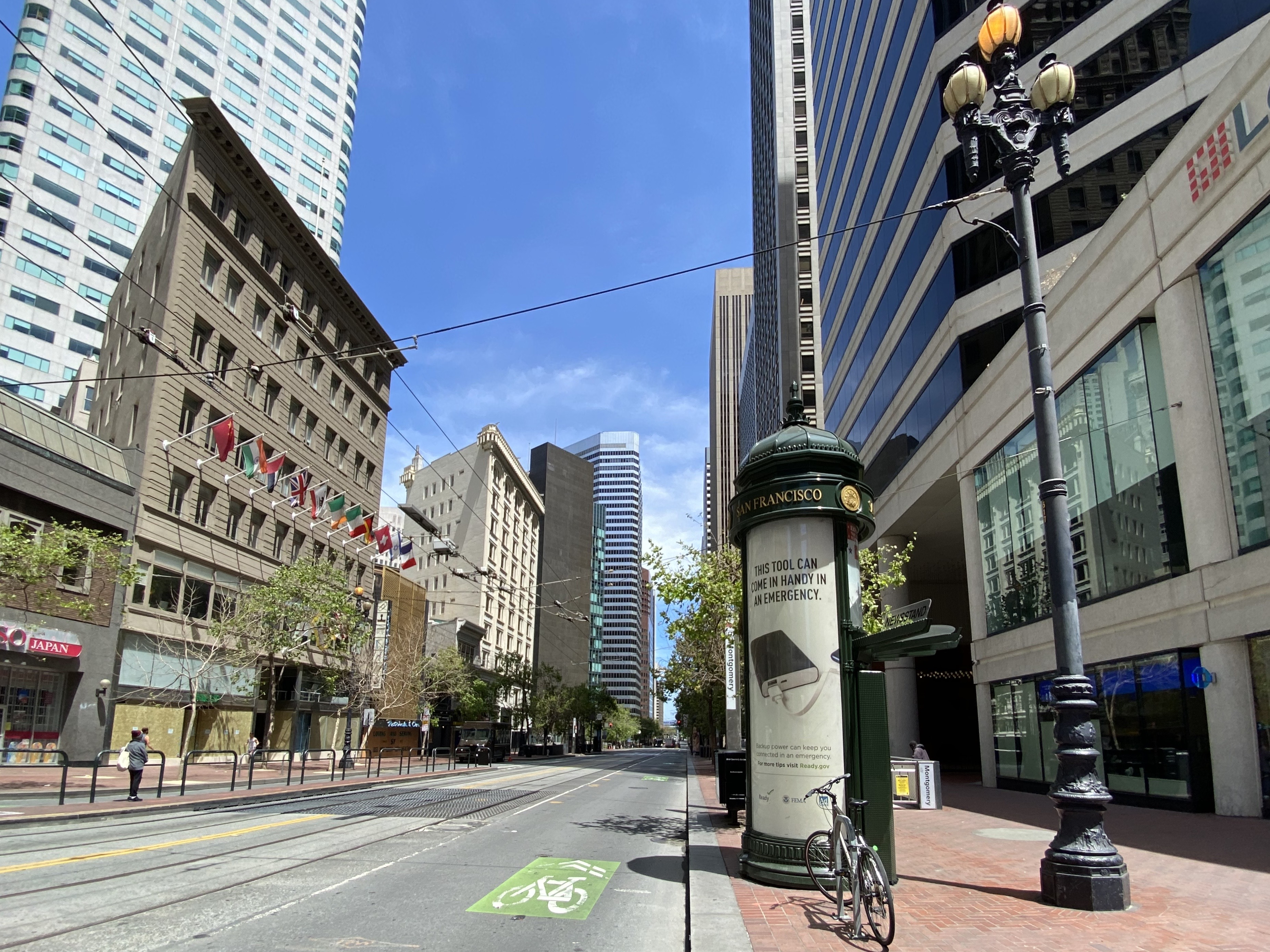
A deserted Market Street in San Francisco's Financial District, 1 p.m., on a weekday afternoon

The Bay Area–wide shelter-in-place order resulted in significant a reduction in road traffic volume, the main source of air pollution in the area. During the first week after the shelter-in-place order took effect, air pollutant levels fell by one-third year over year, while nitrogen dioxide levels in the atmosphere dropped by roughly half compared to the previous week. Traffic on the San Francisco–Oakland Bay Bridge fell by about 40% compared to two weeks earlier. By April, traffic in the Bay Area had decreased by 70%. An 11% reduction in shipping traffic at the Port of Oakland could have also contributed to air quality improvements. An assistant professor of earth system science at Stanford University estimated that improved Bay Area air quality during the shutdown would result in roughly 10 fewer deaths caused by air pollution per week. According to Save the Bay, the decrease in traffic volume also led to decreased water and noise pollution in and around San Francisco Bay. However, traffic volumes and congestion may return to normal levels or worse after the shelter-in-place orders are lifted, due to the avoidance of public transportation.

Disposable, non-biodegradable face masks and latex gloves used during the pandemic have been discarded on sidewalks and in lakes, raising concern about new sources of litter going into the San Francisco Bay at a time when fewer volunteers are available to pick up litter.

== See also ==
- Santa Clara County medical cases chart
- Anti-Mask League of San Francisco
