= Anita Friedman =

Executive director of JFCS

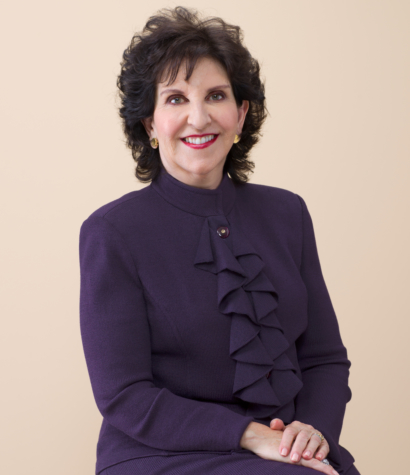
Dr. Anita Friedman

Anita Friedman is the executive director of Jewish Family and Children's Services of San Francisco, the Peninsula, Marin & Sonoma Counties in California, one of the largest family service institutions in America. JFCS operates more than 40 educational and social service programs, among them assisted living for seniors, adoption, refugee resettlement, assistance to the disabled, services for victims of abuse, counseling, and mental health and education services for children and youth. Each year, JFCS serves more than 100,000 individuals. JFCS, founded in 1850, is also the oldest charitable organization west of the Mississippi River.

== Biography ==
Friedman is a noted speaker, philanthropist, activist, and writer on social policy and human services, immigration, and education on the Holocaust and patterns of genocide.

Anita Friedman was born in New York City, attended the University of California at Berkeley, and completed her doctoral degree at the University of San Francisco. Dr. Friedman is a child of Holocaust survivors and lives in San Francisco with her husband and three sons.

== Career ==
Friedman joined JFCS in 1979. During Friedman's leadership at JFCS, the organization has received national recognition for its programs that include Parents Place, a resource center for new parents and children, Seniors-At-Home, a model continuum of care for frail elderly, and the Center for Children and Youth, providing clinical and educational programs for children, families, clinicians, and educators.

She is the editor of Rywka's Diary, published in English in 2015 by Harper. It is now in print in more than a dozen other languages. She has been an international leader in the provision of innovative human services and active in restoring Jewish life in Poland.

Dr. Friedman has served as a Commissioner of the San Francisco Human Services Commission. She serves on the national board of the American Israel Public Affairs Committee, the Taube Foundation for Jewish Life & Culture, and is President of the Board of Trustees of the Koret Foundation.

She also serves as a Trustee on the Boards of the University of Southern California's Shoah Foundation, the Shalom Hartman Institute of North America, and is Vice President of the International Board of Governors of Tel Aviv University.

== Awards and recognitions ==
Friedman has received numerous awards, including the San Francisco Business Times Most Influential Women in Business Award, SPUR's Silver Spur Award for civic leadership, the International Louis Kraft Award for professionals in Jewish communal service, Hadassah's highest honor, the Myrtle Wreath Award, Jewish Community Federation's Professional of the Year, the State of California Family Service Council Award, the Koret Prize for leadership in community service, and a distinguished service award from A Wider Bridge.
