= Joseph Koret =

American businessman (1900–1982)

- Born: 1900; Odessa, Russian Empire
- Died: 1982 (age 81); San Francisco, California, U.S.
- Resting place: Hills of Eternity Memorial Park, Colma, California, U.S.
- Occupations: Businessman; philanthropist
- Known for: Founder of Koret of California
- Spouse(s): Stephanie Shapiro (predeceased); Susan McClain Koret
- Children: None

Joseph Koret (1900–1982) was a Russian-born American businessman and philanthropist, who founded the textile company Koret of California and the not-for-profit Koret Foundation.

== Biography ==
Koret was born in 1900 to a Jewish family in Odessa, Russian Empire (now Ukraine). He immigrated to the United States with his family as a baby in 1901 where he grew up poor on the Lower East Side of Manhattan. Koret moved to San Francisco at age 17, began working for his father's men's clothing company. In 1937 the two founded Koret of California. The company's greatest success arose from its invention in 1961 of Koratron, a new process for permanent press fabrics that was widely adopted in the clothing industry, eventually earning patent license revenues from more than 400 manufacturers that were far greater than the company's clothing sales.

Due to a series of unsuccessful corporate acquisitions the company was near bankruptcy in 1973, when the Korets convinced their friend, Tad Taube, to take over as CEO. Taube began increasing their fortune through further company growth and successful real estate investment. After a series of expansions, divestitures, and a public offering, Koret of California was sold for $71 million in 1979 to its first patent licensee, Levi Strauss & Company. The company was spun off by Levi's in a LBO in 1986, and after further corporate changes is now an Oakland, California-based subsidiary of Kellwood Company, distributing mid-priced clothing to department stores throughout the United States.

== Philanthropy and awards ==
In the late 1970s Taube convinced the Korets, who had no children, to donate their estate to charity, the Koret Foundation. Koret received the community service award of the American Jewish Congress and was to receive the Gates of Jerusalem medal from the State of Israel Bonds but died before he could receive the award.

== Personal life ==
Koret married twice. His first wife was Stephanie Brown, a Jewish immigrant from Romania, whom he married as a teenager; she died in 1978 of dementia.

In January 1981, he married the personal assistant of his wife, Susan McClain (born Whae Hwa Gee in 1938 in Korea, and widowed from a U.S. Army master sergeant). She converted to Judaism. They ran the foundation together with Taube, until Joseph Koret's death in 1982, at which time Susan Koret became chairperson for life with Koret writing "I have given much thought to the future of the Koret Foundation and it is my desire, as well as Susan’s, that she prepare herself to become a director and moving force in the foundation."
