= Santa Clara County Public Health Department =

Department overview
- Jurisdiction: Santa Clara County, California
- Headquarters: 976 Lenzen Avenue, 2nd Floor; San Jose, California 95126; 37°20′3″N 121°54′43″W
- Department executives: Dr. Sarah Rudman, Director; Dr. Sarah Rudman, Health Officer
- Parent department: Santa Clara County Health System
- Website: publichealth.sccgov.org

The Santa Clara County Public Health Department (abbreviated SCCPHD; also known as Santa Clara County Public Health or the County of Santa Clara Public Health Department) is the public health agency for Santa Clara County, California, part of the Santa Clara County Health System. Sarah Rudman is the current Public Health Director and Health Officer of Santa Clara County.

== History ==
The department was accredited by the Public Health Accreditation Board in March 2016. Under Sara Cody, the department was one of the first in the United States to issue a stay-at-home order in response to the COVID-19 pandemic in 2020.
