= A Wider Bridge =

American nonprofit organization

- Established: 2010; 16 years ago
- Location: New York City, United States
- Director: Ethan Felson
- Website: awiderbridge.org

A Wider Bridge was a United States–based 501(c)(3) nonprofit organization which mobilizes the LGBTQ community to fight antisemitism and support Israel and its LGBTQ community. AWB connects the LGBT communities in the U.S. and Israel and advocating for LGBT rights in Israel. The organization has activists across North America and around the world. It sponsors a campaign Queers Against Antisemitism which is described as "a movement of queer activists who pledge to fight antisemitism as it spreads around the globe."

== History ==
The organization was founded in 2010 by Arthur Slepian after a homophobic shooting in Bar Noar, a gay bar in Tel Aviv. Slepian thought that LGBT relations between North America and Israel should not only come in times of crisis, but that the communities in both countries should be more consistently connected. The group also focuses on the message that it is possible to be both LGBT and Jewish.

In 2011 A Wider Bridge was named an Upstarter by the group UpStart, a Jewish entrepreneurial group.

In 2017, A Wider Bridge announced that they would be changing directors on January 15 of 2018 from Arthur Slepian to Tye Gregory.

In July 2020 A Wider Bridge announced Ethan Felson as executive director. In November 2024 Felson was charged with lewd and lascivious conduct due to allegations of sexual misconduct against a Vermont museum employee, and in March 2025 Denise Eger was named as interim executive director of A Wider Bridge.

== Services ==
=== Education ===
A Wider Bridge does educational presentations at various places across the United States, including college campuses, to inform others about LGBT rights in Israel. The group brings LGBT activists and artists from Israel across the U.S. to help educate people about LGBT life and culture in Israel. A Wider Bridge also educates Jewish LGBT individuals in how to be better leaders.

=== Trips to Israel ===
A Wider Bridge plans and sponsors trips that take LGBT people from the United States to various places in Israel so that they can learn and connect with LGBT and other human rights organizations in Israel and develop their leadership skills. The groups also meet with LGBT Palestinians and Ethiopians.

A Wider Bridge has also partnered with Olivia Travel to sponsor a trip specifically for women focusing on feminist and lesbian issues in Israel.

=== Refugee advocacy ===
A Wider Bridge hosts events specifically to educate the public on issues about LGBT refugees from the Middle East and North Africa. The group also works to raise money for organizations helping these same LGBT refugees.

== Controversy ==
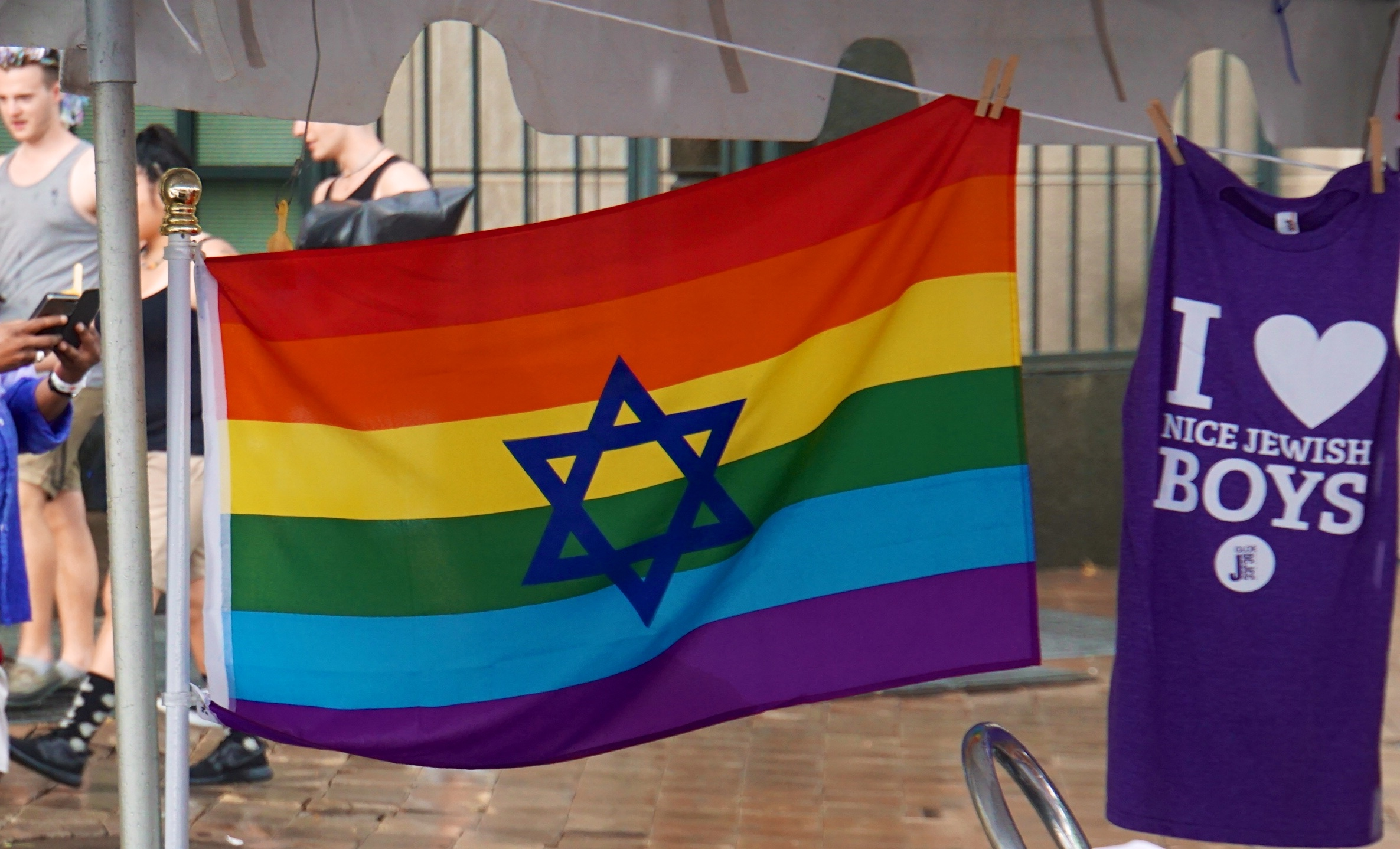
A rainbow flag featuring the Star of David.

=== Creating Change Conference ===
In 2016, A Wider Bridge had planned to present with Jerusalem Open House, an Israeli-based LGBT organization, at the National LGBTQ Task Force's Creating Change Conference. The presentation was canceled by the National LGBTQ Task Force because of an outcry from anti-Israel activists. A Wider Bridge called for the presentation to be uncancelled through a petition and press release. The presentation was then uncancelled. The presentation did go on, but was interrupted by protestors and was not completed. The National LGBTQ Task Force later condemned the protest for anti-semitism.

=== Chicago Dyke March ===
At the 2017 Chicago Dyke March, three women claimed they were expelled for carrying a rainbow flag with the Star of David on it, a symbol of representation for Jewish LGBT individuals. According to the three women, they were told by the march organizers that they were kicked out because the march was anti-Zionist and pro-Palestine and because others were feeling threatened. However, march organizers claimed that the flag was an Israeli flag superimposed on a rainbow flag while American flags similarly superimposed were also not welcome, and that the three women were expelled after repeatedly expressing support for Zionism. One of the women who was expelled was a regional director at A Wider Bridge, and the organization has since come out against their expulsion and has created a petition asking the organizers of the Chicago Dyke March to apologize. The Anti-Defamation League, Human Rights Campaign, and the Simon Wiesenthal Center, have also spoken out against the banning of the Jewish Pride flag and the expulsion of the women.

=== Pride Season 2024 ===
A Wider Bridge sounded an alarm in early 2024 that anti-Israel activists might disrupt LGBTQ Pride events in multiple cities to protest Israel.
