= Second Harvest of Silicon Valley =

Food bank in California, US

- Abbreviation: SHSV
- Formation: October 1988; 37 years ago
- Merger of: The Food Bank Inc. of Santa Clara County, San Mateo County Food Bank
- Type: Nonprofit organization
- Registration no.: 94-2614101
- Legal status: 501(c)(3) organization
- Purpose: Humanitarian
- Headquarters: San Jose, California
- Coordinates: 37°24′46″N 121°57′7″W
- Region served: Santa Clara and San Mateo counties in California
- Chief executive officer: Leslie Bacho
- Affiliations: Feeding America, California Association of Food Banks
- Revenue: $136 million (2019)
- Website: www.shfb.org
- Formerly called: Second Harvest Food Bank of Santa Clara and San Mateo Counties

Second Harvest of Silicon Valley (abbreviated SHSV) is a food bank based in San Jose, California, that serves Santa Clara and San Mateo counties, including Silicon Valley and the San Francisco Peninsula. With $136 million in revenue in 2019, it is the largest food bank in the San Francisco Bay Area and the 12th largest in the United States. As of 2020, it serves about 500,000 people on average per month. It is affiliated with Feeding America, a national network of food banks, as well as the California Association of Food Banks. Leslie Bacho is the organization's chief executive officer.

== History ==
Second Harvest of Silicon Valley began in 1974 as The Food Bank of Santa Clara County, a program of the now-defunct nonprofit organization Economic and Social Opportunities Inc. In 1979, The Food Bank Inc. of Santa Clara County incorporated as a separate nonprofit organization and joined the Second Harvest system, now called Feeding America.

After federal government subsidies to Second Harvest ended in 1984, The Food Bank and the smaller San Mateo County Food Bank relied solely on donations, and Catholic Charities of San Mateo County began administering the San Mateo County Food Bank. In October 1988, the two food banks merged to become Second Harvest Food Bank of Santa Clara and San Mateo Counties.

In 1998, Second Harvest began accepting online monetary donations as well as online donations of groceries through Peapod.

On July 30, 2019, the organization adopted its current name, Second Harvest of Silicon Valley.

== Facilities ==
Second Harvest operates four distribution centers, including:

- The 65,000-square-foot (6,000 m^{2}) Curtner Center opened in 1992 in San Jose.
- The 22,000-square-foot (2,000 m^{2}) Peninsula Distribution Center (Bing Center) opened in 1996 in San Carlos.
- The Cypress Center opened in 2012 in North San Jose as a dedicated distribution facility for fresh produce.

In 2021, Second Harvest announced a plan to consolidate food handling operations at its three San Jose facilities into a single 10.4-acre (4.2 ha) site in Alviso with 250,000 square feet (23,000 m^{2}) of floor space. The Bing Center would remain in San Carlos.

Second Harvest distributes groceries through a network of over 300 partner agencies throughout both counties. Forty percent of the people who assist with Second Harvest programs are volunteers.

== Demographics ==
During the COVID-19 pandemic, Second Harvest served about 500,000 people on average per month, an increase from 250,000 people before the pandemic began. Most families it serves have working parents who experience food insecurity due to the San Francisco Bay Area's high cost of living amid the California housing shortage. A quarter of the organization's clients are college-educated (as of 2006) and 11% are homeless (as of 2012).

== See also ==
- Alameda County Community Food Bank
- List of food banks
