= Alameda County Community Food Bank =

US non-profit organization

The Alameda County Community Food Bank is a non-profit organization that supplies food to 400+ Alameda County, California agencies including food pantries, soup kitchens, child-care and senior centers, and after-school programs, provides an emergency food helpline, teaches nutrition and hunger education, and conducts outreach about California's food stamps program CalFresh. Located in Oakland, California, the food bank distributes enough food for 300,000 meals weekly. Almost 50% of the food supply consists of fresh produce from California farms. The organization is a member of the California Association of Food Banks, Feeding America, and the California Hunger Action Coalition. Their headquarters are at 7900 Edgewater Drive, next door to Oikos University. The food bank is in the former location of the book distributor Bookpeople.

== Outreach programs ==
According to 2010 census figures, 13.5 percent of the Alameda County population live below the poverty line and about 70 percent of students in the Oakland school district qualify for free or reduced-priced meals at school. The Alameda County Community Food Bank assists some of these students through their Children's BackPack Program. At the end of every other week, a bag of food is given to these students' families so they will have enough food for the weekend. The Alameda County Community Food Bank works with CARD (Collaborating Agencies Responding to Disasters) to build their organizational disaster response capacity and share emergency readiness within their network of 275 service providers.

== See also ==
- List of food banks
- Second Harvest of Silicon Valley
