= Food Bank Singapore =

Singaporean charity

The Food Bank Singapore
- The corporate logo of Food Bank Singapore
- Formation: August 2012
- Founded at: Singapore
- Type: Company Limited by Guarantee
- Registration no.: 201200654E
- Legal status: Charity, Institutions of a Public Character (IPC)
- Services: Foodbanking
- Fields: Social and welfare
- Affiliations: The Global Foodbanking Network
- Website: foodbank.sg

The Food Bank Singapore Ltd. was founded in 2012, and is a registered charity and Institution of a Public Character (IPC) in Singapore. It operates as a foodbank that collects excess food from food suppliers and re-distributes them to organisations such as old folks' homes, family service centres and soup kitchens. Food Bank Singapore is a member of the Global Foodbanking Network.

As of 2019, it also distributes food through Food Pantry 2.0, vending machines at various locations which are accessible 24/7 to those with a special food credit card.

== History ==
In Singapore, the National Environment Agency publishes annual statistics of food waste. In 2014, 788,600 tonnes of food is wasted annually in Singapore, and the recycling rate is only 13% (whereas the overall recycling rate is 60%).

== Services ==
The Food Bank Singapore provides various types of food donations to beneficiaries by collecting excess non-perishables from food industry donors, food drives, and bank boxes located island-wide. They collect perishable food like fruits and vegetables from Pasir Panjang Wholesale Centre, cakes and pastries from F&B establishments, and cooked food from hotels through their Food Rescue Project.

== See also ==
- Feeding America
- Food waste
- List of food banks
- List of voluntary welfare organisations in Singapore
- List of food labeling regulations
