= FHK =

FHK may refer to:

- Feeding Hong Kong, food bank in Hong Kong
- Fredericia HK, Danish handball club
- "Free Hong Kong", slogan for Hong Kong democracy movement
- Kempten University of Applied Sciences (formerly Fachhochschule Kempten)
- Technical University of Cologne (formerly Fachhochschule Köln)
