= Food bank =

Charitable organization that gives out food

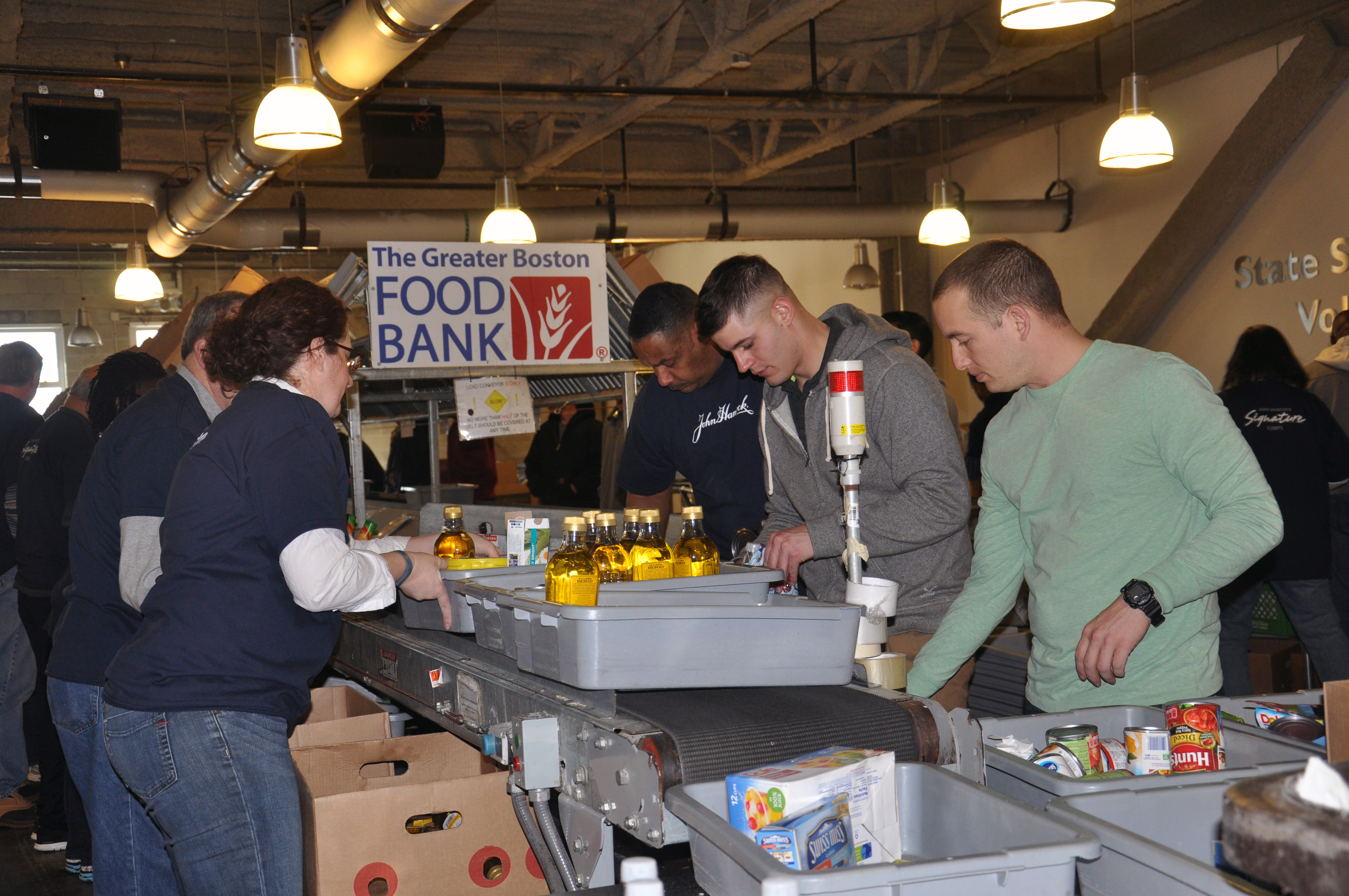
Volunteers sort food at the Greater Boston Food Bank

A food bank is a non-profit, charitable organization that collects food for distribution to those who have difficulty purchasing enough to avoid hunger, usually through intermediaries like food pantries and soup kitchens. Some food banks distribute food directly.

St. Mary's Food Bank was the world's first food bank, established in the US in 1967. Since then, many thousands have been set up all over the world. In Europe, their numbers grew rapidly after the global increase in the price of food which began in late 2006, and especially after the 2008 financial crisis began to worsen economic conditions for those on low incomes. Likewise, the inflation and economic crisis of the 2020s has exponentially driven low and even some middle income class consumers to at least partially get their food.

The growth of food banks has been welcomed by commentators who see them as examples of active, caring citizenship. Other academics and commentators have expressed concern that the rise of food banks may erode political support for welfare provision. Researchers have reported that in some cases food banks can be inefficient compared with state-run welfare.

Individuals in lower income areas in the United States who depend on food banks often receive foods that are highly processed and low in nutrients. In the United States, dependence on food banks has led to a rise in obesity and diabetes within the food insecure community. Food insecure individuals living in low-income communities experience higher rates of chronic disease, leading to healthcare costs which create more financial hardships.

Starting in spring 2025, it became even more difficult for people in the United States who depend on food banks to get nourishing food. The Trump administration cut $500 million or about 25 percent less than what was received by food banks from the Emergency Food Assistance Program in 2024. Plus in the summer of 2025 President Trump signed into law the biggest cut in food stamps (SNAP) in the program's history.

== Operational models ==
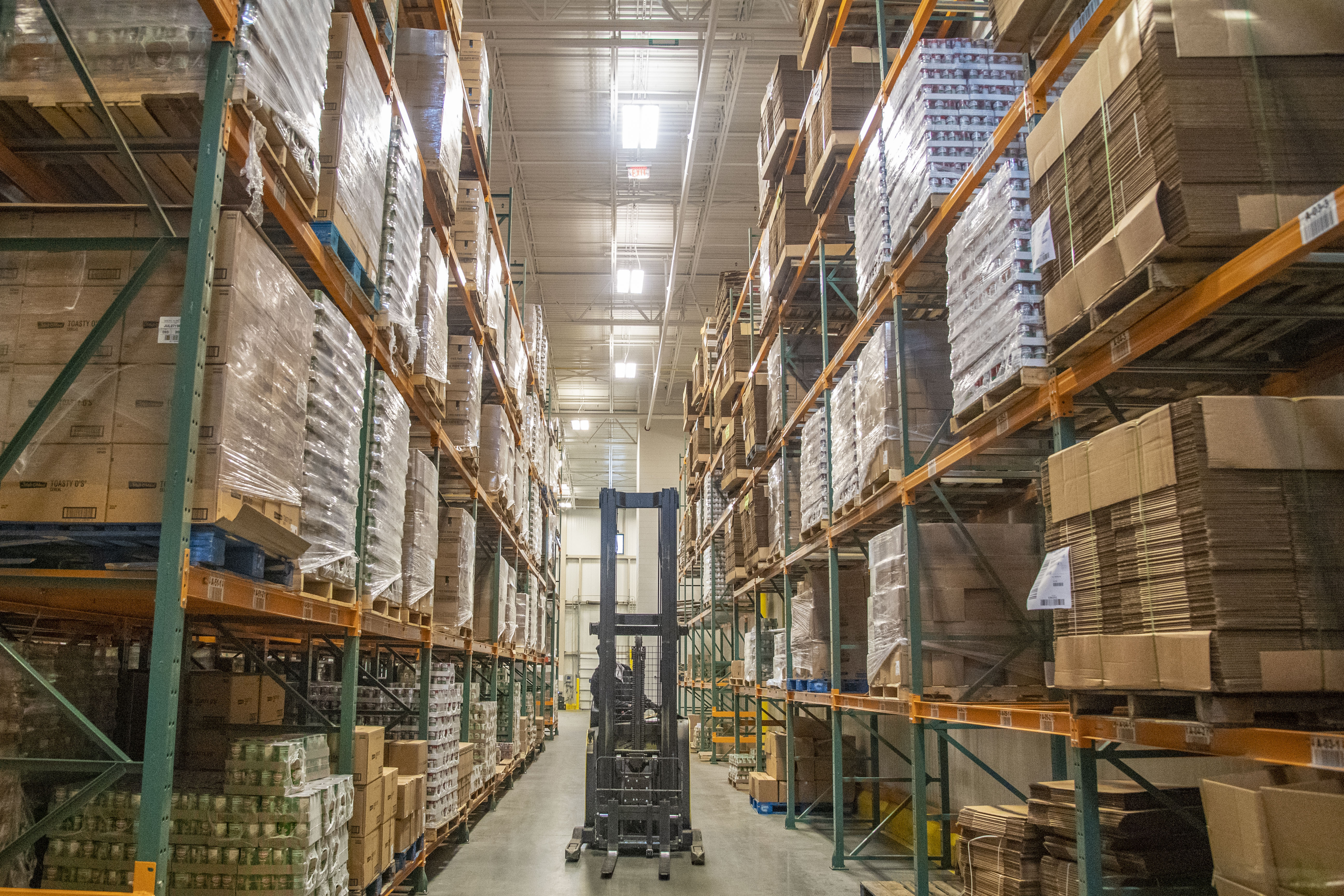
The warehouse of the Capital Area Food Bank

With thousands of food banks operating around the world, there are many different models.

A major distinction between food banks is whether or not they operate on the "front line" model, giving out food directly to the hungry, or whether they operate with the "warehouse" model, supplying food to intermediaries like food pantries, soup kitchens and other front-line organizations. In the US, Australia and to an extent in Canada, the standard model is for food banks to act as warehouses rather than as suppliers to the end user, though there are exceptions. In other countries, food banks usually hand out food parcels direct to hungry people, providing the service that in the US is offered by food pantries.

In addition to this basic distinction, recent research comes to exemplify that many food banks are redesigning their warehouse and distribution models to support "nutrition-focused food banking," where inventory management, sourcing, and partner selection become organized around the idea of providing more nutritious foods rather than simply maximizing total volume distributed.

Another distinction is between the charity model and the labor union model. At least in Canada and the US, food banks run by charities often place relatively more weight on the salvaging of food that would otherwise go to waste, and on encouraging voluntarism, whereas those run by unions can place greater emphasis on feeding the hungry by any means available, on providing work for the unemployed, and on education, especially on explaining to users their civil rights.

In the US, cities will often have a single food bank that acts as a centralized warehouse and will serve several hundred front-line agencies. Like a blood bank, that warehouse serves as a single collection and distribution point for food donations. A food bank operates a lot like a for-profit food distributor, but in this case, it distributes food to charities, not to food retailers. There is often no charge to the charities, but some food banks do charge a small "shared maintenance" fee to help defray the cost of storage and distribution. Scholars have used operations research methods such as linear, mixed-interger, and dynamic programming to model these warehouse operations, with the overall goal of optimizing, routing, storage, and allocation decision and reducing costs and food waste.

For many US food banks, most of their donated food comes from food left over from the normal processes of for-profit companies. It can come from any part of the food chain, e.g. from growers who have produced too much or whose food is not sufficiently visually appealing; from manufacturers who overproduced; or from retailers who over-ordered. Often the product is approaching or past its "sell by" date. In such cases, the food bank liaises with the food industry and with regulators to make sure the food is safe and legal to distribute and eat.

Other sources of food include the general public, sometimes in the form of "food drives", and government programs that buy and distribute excess farm products mostly to help support higher commodity prices. Food banks can also buy food either at market prices or from wholesalers and retailers at discounted prices, often at a cost. Sometimes farmers will allow food banks to send gleaners to salvage leftover crops for free once their primary harvest is complete. A few food banks have even taken over their farms, though such initiatives have not always been successful.

Many food banks do not accept fresh produce, preferring canned or packaged food due to health and safety concerns, though some have tried to change this as part of a growing worldwide awareness of the importance of nutrition. As an example, in 2012, London Food Bank (Canada) started accepting perishable food, reporting that as well as the obvious health benefits, there were noticeable emotional benefits to recipients when they were given fresh food.

Summer can be a challenging time for food banks, particularly in regions where school children are usually given regular free meals during term time. Spikes in demand can coincide with periods where donations fall due to folk being on holiday.

== Food pantries ==
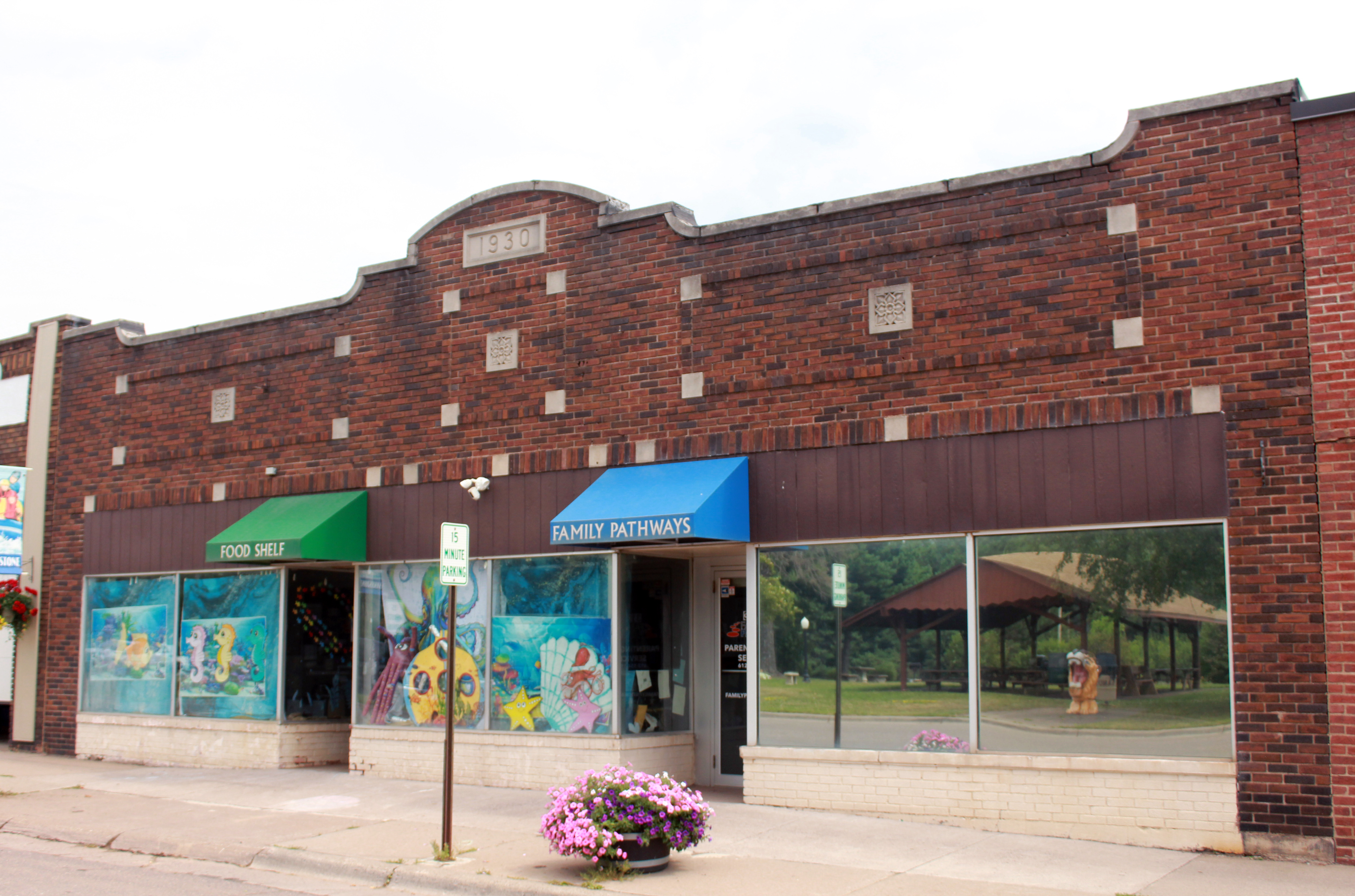
Food shelf (pantry) in Sandstone, Minnesota

Food pantries and food shelves provide food directly to people for household use. Unlike food banks, which collect, store, and distribute food to other organizations, pantries are the local points of service where people receive food.

The term food shelf is used in some states, especially in Minnesota. In many cases, food shelf means the same a food pantry. The name may change by region, but the work is the same.

Food banks operate on a larger scale. They gather food from farms, grocery stores, food drives, and other sources, then send it to agencies that serve the public. Food pantries and food shelves work at the community level, where staff or volunteers meet with clients, distribute food, and respond to immediate need.

Food pantries also support food banks in several ways. They report patterns in demand, help identify shortages, and share information about the kinds of food people need most. Many also organize food drives, recruit volunteers, and connect donors to the food bank network. In this way, they serve as an important link between food banks and the people who rely on them.

== Worldwide ==
Since the 1980s food banking has spread around the world. There are over 50 countries and regions with active food bank groups under the umbrella of the Global Food Banking Network. Countries and regions in the international network include Argentina, Australia, Brazil, Chile, Columbia, Guatemala, Hong Kong, India, Israel, Russia, Singapore, South Africa, South Korea, Taiwan, Turkey, and the UK. There are also several countries with food banks which have not yet joined the network, either because they do not yet meet the required criteria or they have not applied.

== North America ==
=== Canada ===
In Canada, foodbanks underwent a period of rapid growth after the cutbacks in welfare that took place in the mid-1990s. As early as the 1980s, food banks had also begun to spread from the United States to the rest of the world. The first European food bank was founded in France in 1984. In the 1990s and early 2000s, food banks were established in South America, Africa, and Asia, in several cases with van Hengel acting as a consultant. In 2007, The Global Food Banking Network was formed.

=== United States ===
History

The world's first food bank was St. Mary's Food Bank in Phoenix, Arizona, founded by John van Hengel in 1967. According to sociology professor Janet Poppendieck, the hunger within the US was widely considered to be a solved problem until the mid-1960s. By the mid-sixties, several states had ended the free distribution of federal food surpluses, instead providing an early form of food stamps which had the benefit of allowing recipients to choose food of their liking, rather than having to accept whatever happened to be in surplus at the time. However, there was a minimum charge and some people could not afford the stamps, leading to severe hunger.

One response from American society to the rediscovery of hunger was to step up the support provided by soup kitchens and similar civil society food relief agencies – some of these dated back to the Great Depression and earlier. In 1965, while volunteering for a community dining room, van Hengel learned that grocery stores often had to throw away food that had damaged packaging or was near expiration. He started collecting that food for the dining room but soon had too much for that one program. He thought of creating a central location from which any agency can receive donations. Described as a classic case of "if you build it they will come", the first food bank was created with the help of St. Mary's Basilica, which became the namesake of the organization.

Food banks spread across the United States, and Canada. By 1976, van Hengel had established the organization known today as Feeding America. As of the early 21st century, their network of over 200 food banks provides support for 90,000 projects. Other large networks exist such as AmpleHarvest.org, created by CNN Hero and World Food Prize nominee Gary Oppenheimer which lists nearly 9,000 food pantries (1 out of every 4 in America) across all 50 states that are eager to receive surplus locally grown garden produce from any of America's 62 million home or community gardeners.

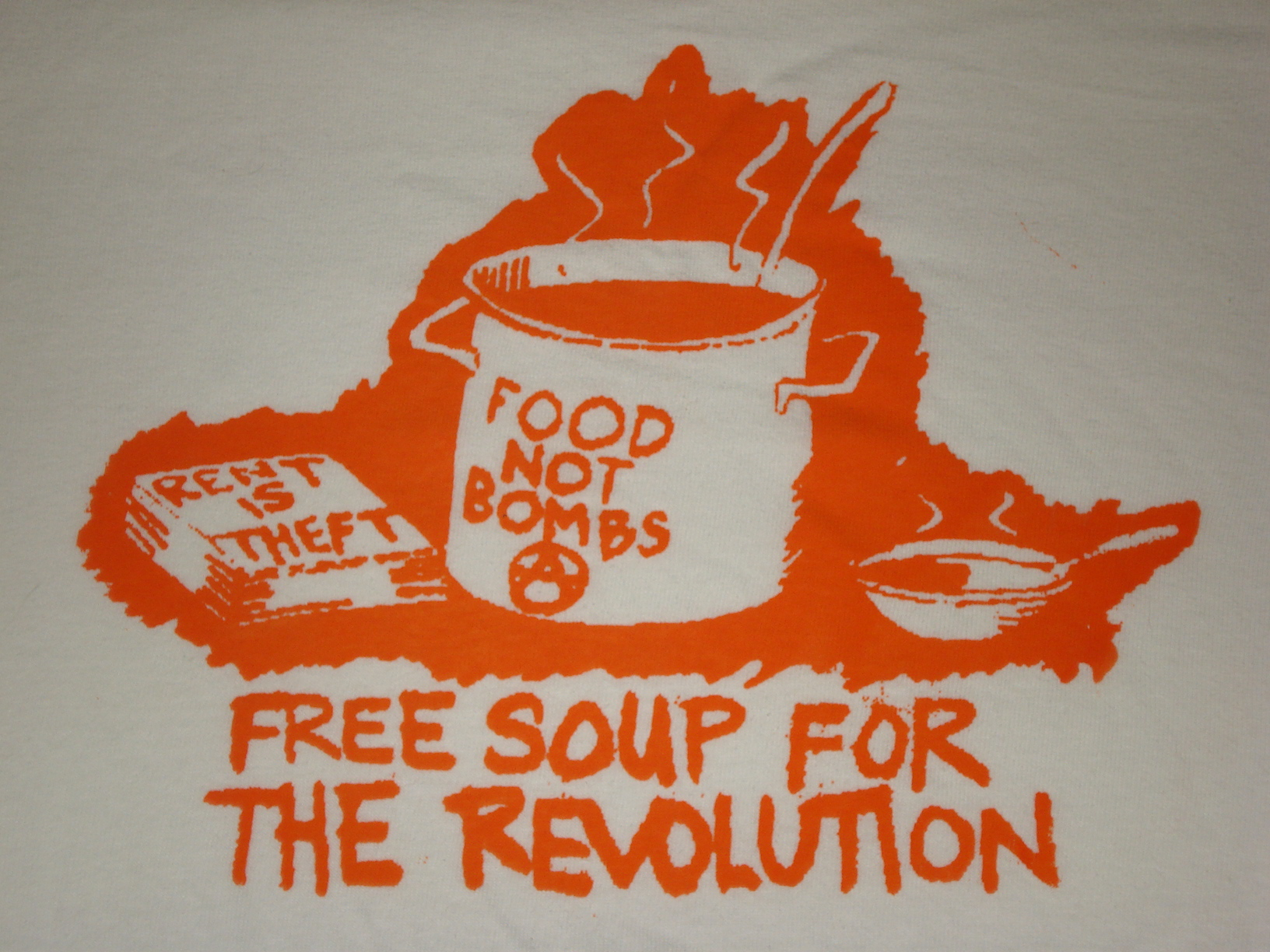
Food Not Bombs, a food bank and distribution cooperative

In the 1980s, US food banks began to grow rapidly. A second response to the "rediscovery" of hunger in the mid-1960s had been extensive lobbying of politicians to improve welfare. Until the 1980s, this approach had a greater impact. In the 1970s, US Federal expenditure on hunger relief grew by about 500%, with food stamps distributed free of charge to those in greatest need. According to Poppendieck, welfare was widely considered preferable to grassroots efforts, as the latter could be unreliable and did not give recipients consumer-style choice in the same way as did food stamps. It also risked recipients feeling humiliated by having to turn to charity. In the early 1980s, Ronald Reagan's administration scaled back welfare provision, leading to a rapid rise in activity from grassroots hunger relief agencies. According to a comprehensive government survey completed in 2002, over 90% of food banks were established in the US after 1981. Poppendieck says that for the first few years after the change, there was vigorous opposition from the left, who argued that state welfare was much more suitable for meeting recipients needs. But in the decades that followed, food banks have become an accepted part of America's response to hunger. Demand for the services of US food banks increased further in the late 1990s, after the "end of welfare as we know it" with the Personal Responsibility and Work Opportunity Act was signed into law by President Bill Clinton in 1996.

Food aid for pets

Some US cities have organizations that provide dog and cat food for pets whose owners qualify for food assistance. For example, Daffy's Pet Soup Kitchen in Lawrenceville, Georgia, is considered the largest pet food aid agency in Georgia, distributing over 800,000 pounds of dog and cat food in 2012. Daffy's Pet Soup Kitchen was started in 1997 by Tom Wargo, a repairman who was working in an elderly woman's home when he noticed her sharing her Meals on Wheels lunch with her pet cat because she could not afford cat food. Daffy's was one of seven non-profit organizations recognized by Barefoot Wine in 2013 through a $10,000 donation and by being featured on labels of the vintner's Impression Red Blend wines. Pet Buddies Food Pantry in Atlanta, Georgia, is another example of an establishment that provides food aid for pets. The St. Augustine Humane Society in St. Augustine, Florida, distributes over 1,600 pounds of pet food each month to families who are experiencing economic hardship and cannot afford to feed their pets.

Food pantries for students

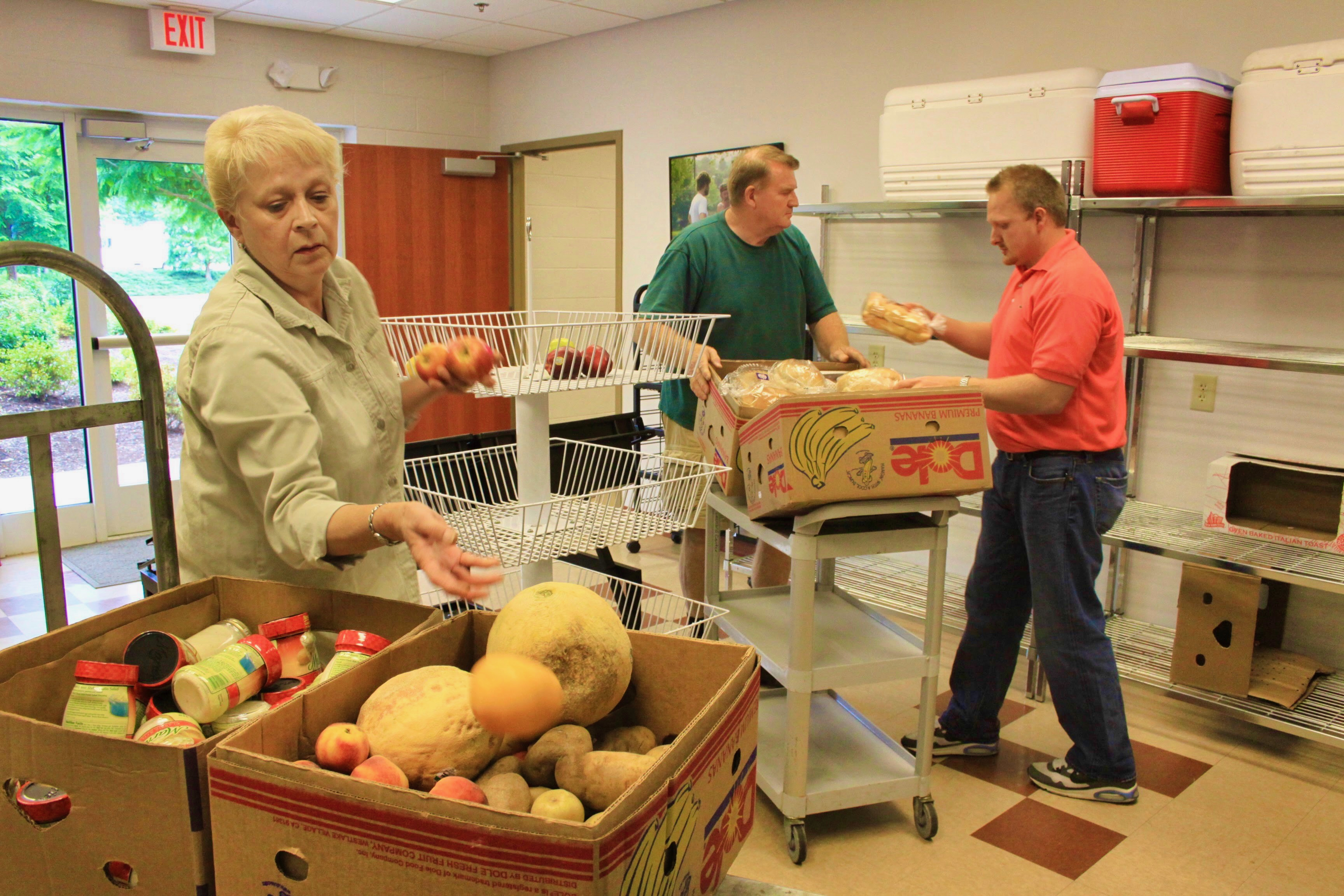
A food bank at Lee University in Cleveland, Tennessee

The college and University Food Bank Alliance, which was formed in 2012, has 570 campus food pantries nationwide. On-campus food pantries were available at 70% of State University of New York locations by 2019.

After the 2008 financial crisis

Following the 2008 financial crisis, and the lasting inflation in the price of food that began in late 2006, there has been a further increase in the number of individuals requesting help from American and Canadian food banks. By 2012, according to Food Banks Canada, over 850,000 Canadians needed help from a food bank each month. For the United States, Gleaners Food Bank of Indiana reported in 2012 that there were then 50 million Americans struggling with food insecurity (about 1 in 6 of the population), with the number of individuals seeking help from food banks having increased by 46% since 2005. According to a 2012 UCLA Center for Health Policy Research study, there has been a 40% increase in demand for Californian food banks since 2008, with married couples who both work sometimes requiring the aid of food banks. Dave Krepcho, Director of the Second Harvest Food Bank in Orlando, has said that college-educated professional couples have begun to turn to food pantries.

By mid-2012, US food banks had expressed concerns about the expected difficulty in feeding the hungry over the coming months. Rapidly rising demand has been coinciding with higher food prices and with a decrease in donations, partly as the food industry is becoming more efficient and so has less mislabelled and other slightly defective food to give away. Also, there has been less surplus federal food on offer. Additionally, there have been recent decreases in government funding, and Congress has been debating possible further cuts, including potentially billions of dollars from the Supplemental Nutrition Assistance Program (food stamp program). In September 2012, Feeding America launched Hunger Action Month, with events planned all over the nation. Food banks and other involved agencies expected to raise awareness of the fact that approximately 16% of Americans are struggling with hunger, as well as to get more Americans involved in helping out.

Food banks and COVID-19

The COVID-19 outbreak impacted European food banks since value chains were notably disrupted and food banks lacked the support of volunteers. Compared to 2019, the amount of food distributed increased in 2020. Possibly through an increase in people in need. At the same time, the deliveries of shelf-stable food decreased by 20% due to panic buying, especially at the beginning of the crisis.

Health consequences

Food insecure individuals have turned to food banks, which in turn has led to a rise in obesity and diabetes within the food insecure community. Many foods offered to clients in food banks are high in processed sugars and salts and low in vitamin and mineral content. The low nutritional quality of foods available to clientele at food banks has led to further health effects. A study showed 33% of American households visiting food pantries had diabetes.

Since the 1980s, the change in governmental agricultural policy has led to the processing of soybeans and corns into high fructose corn syrup. This cheap ingredient is widely used in many high fat, processed foods which are priced to be affordable for low income consumers and are also distributed in food banks.

Individuals in lower income areas are dependent on food banks and because of that are not getting foods that are high in nutrients. Food insecure individuals, who live in low-income communities experience higher rates of chronic disease, leading to healthcare costs which create more financial hardships.

Gallery

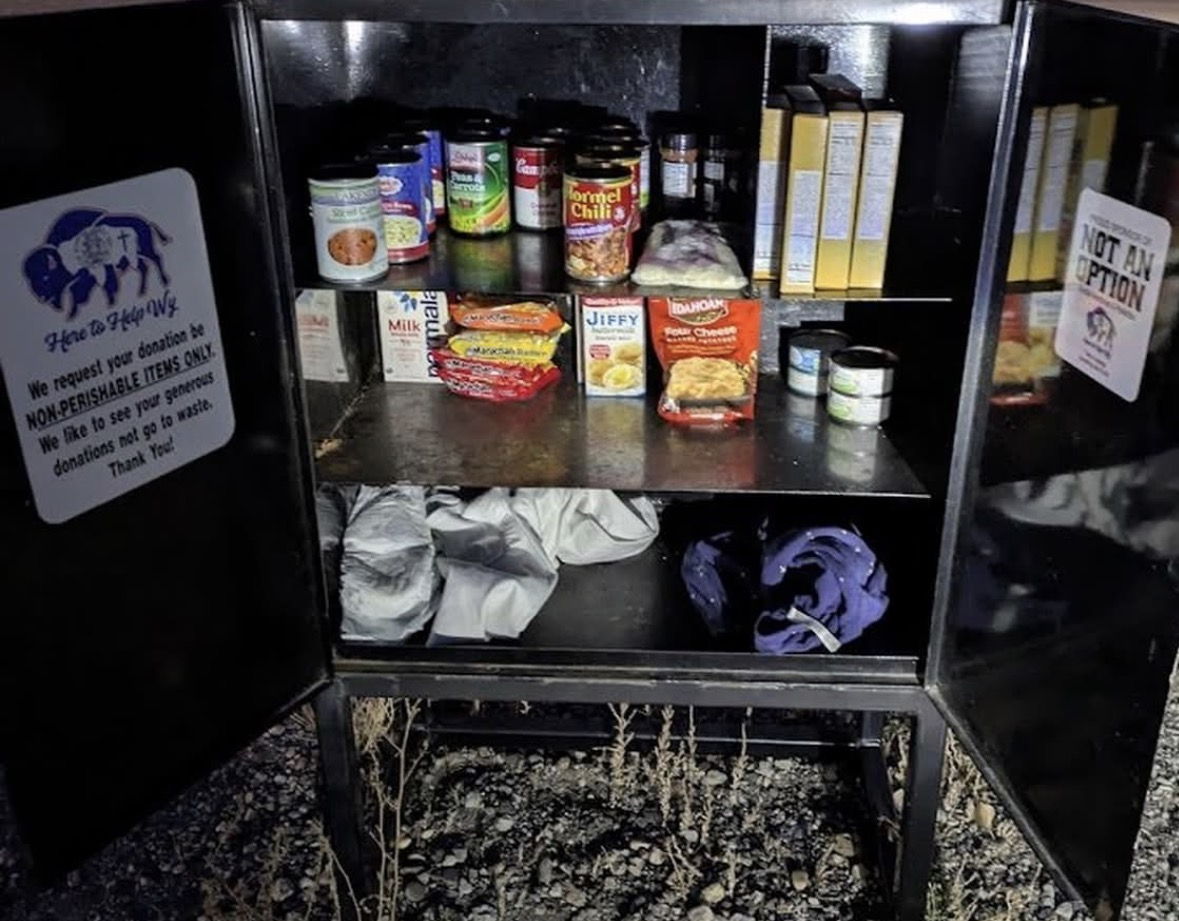
Outdoor Food Pantry in Mills, Wyoming (2025)

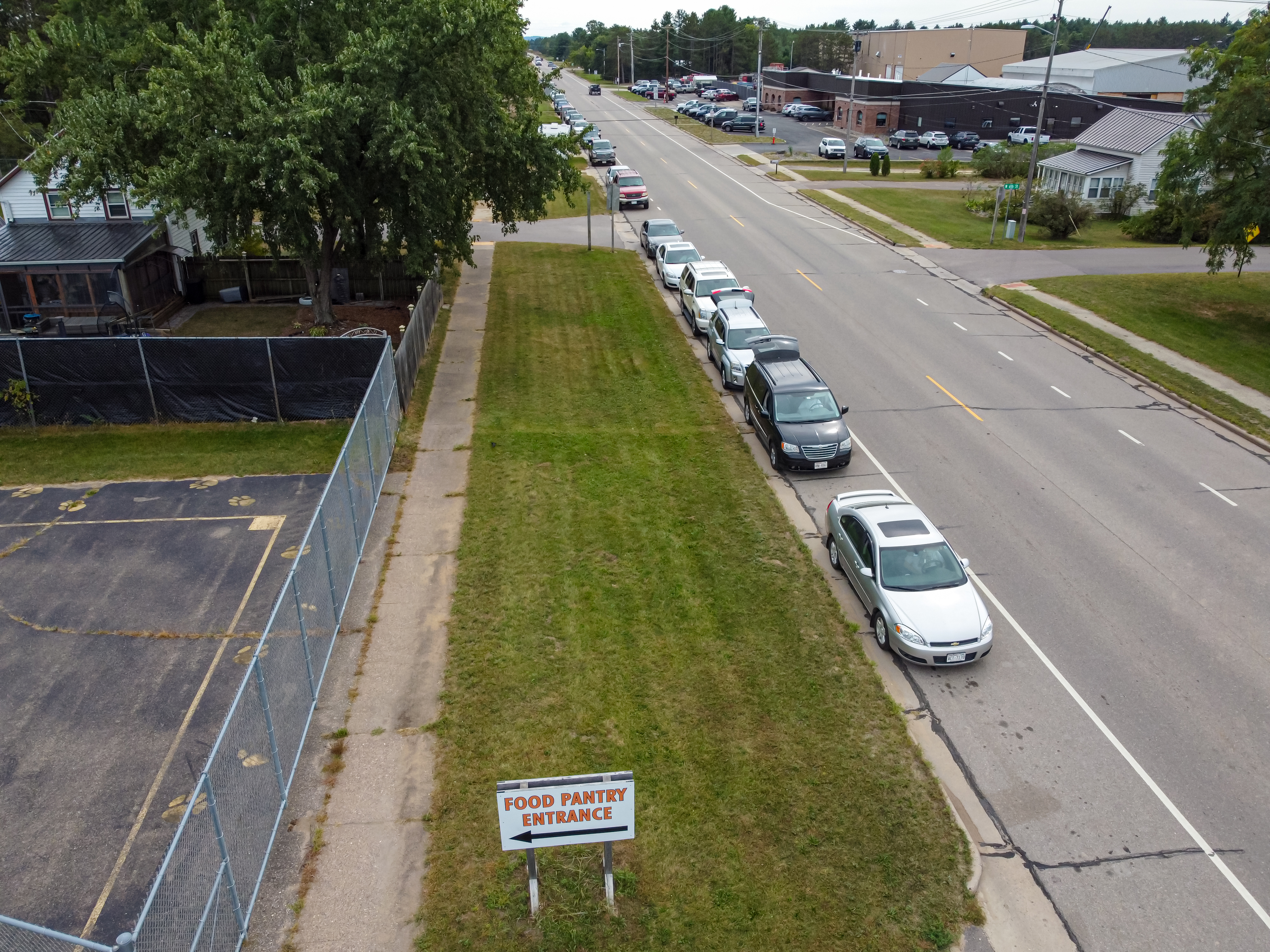
Food pantry car line

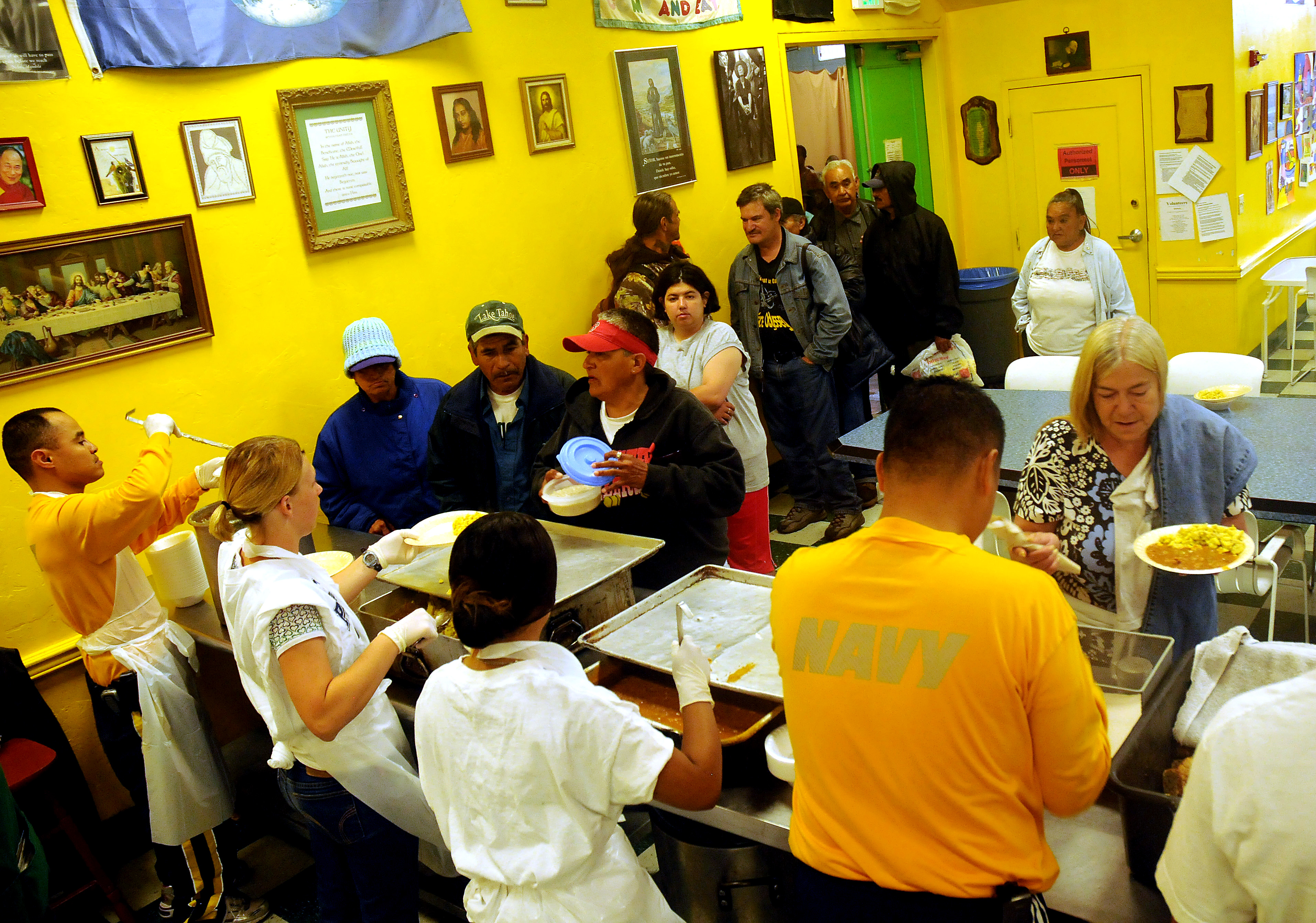
Members of the United States Navy serving visitors

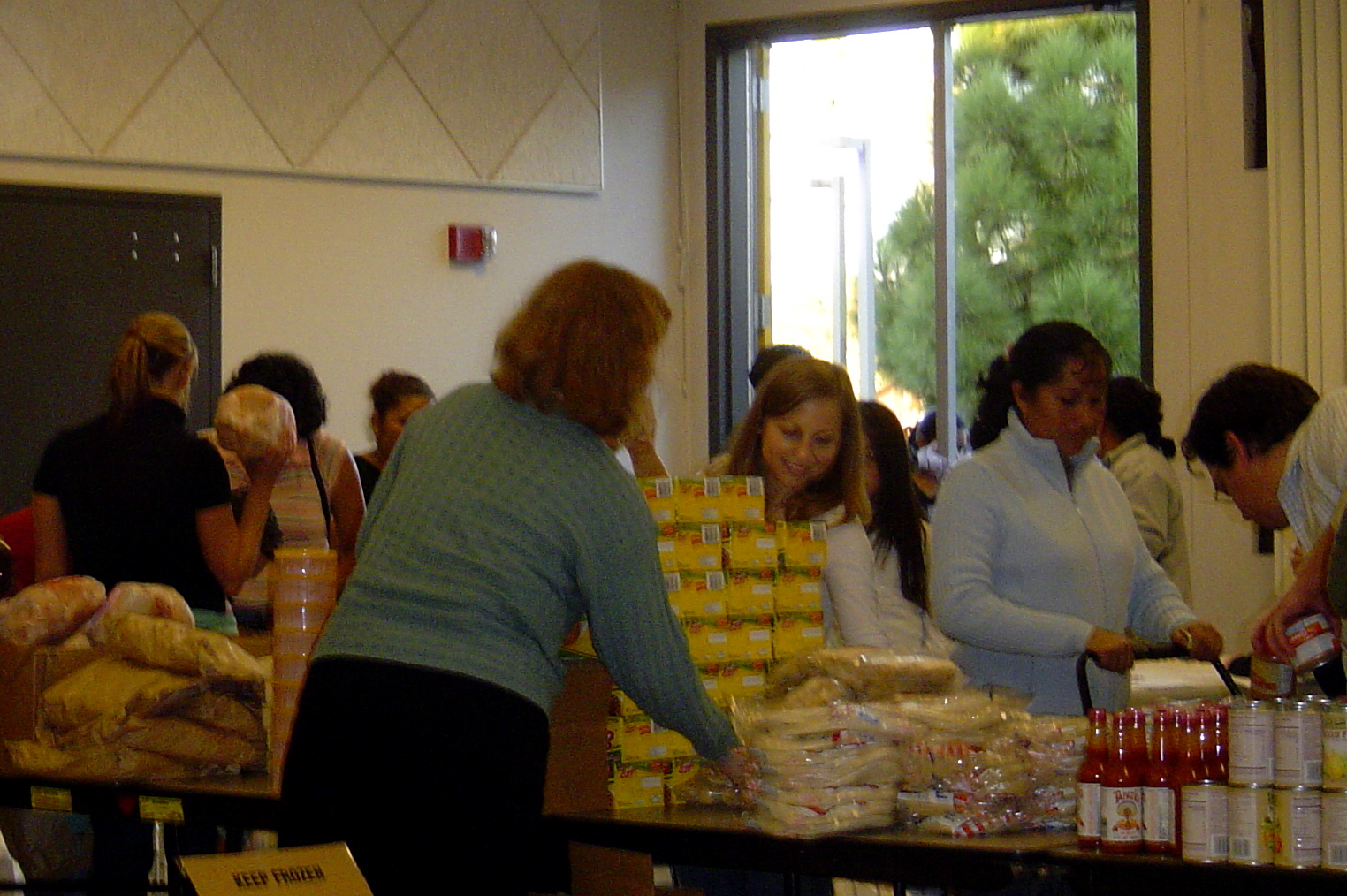
Volunteers pass out food items from a food pantry run by Feeding America

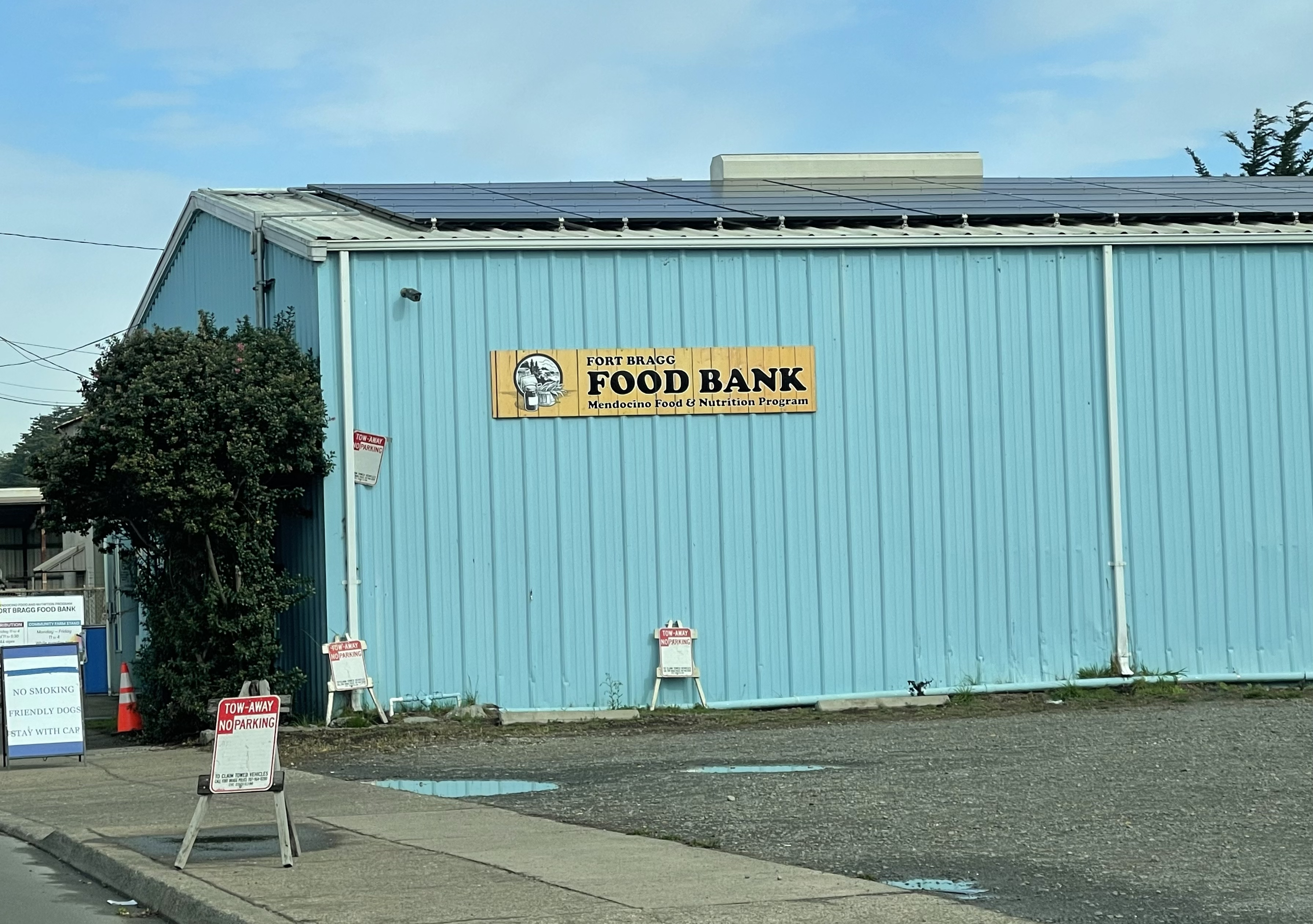
Fort Bragg Food Bank in Fort Bragg, California

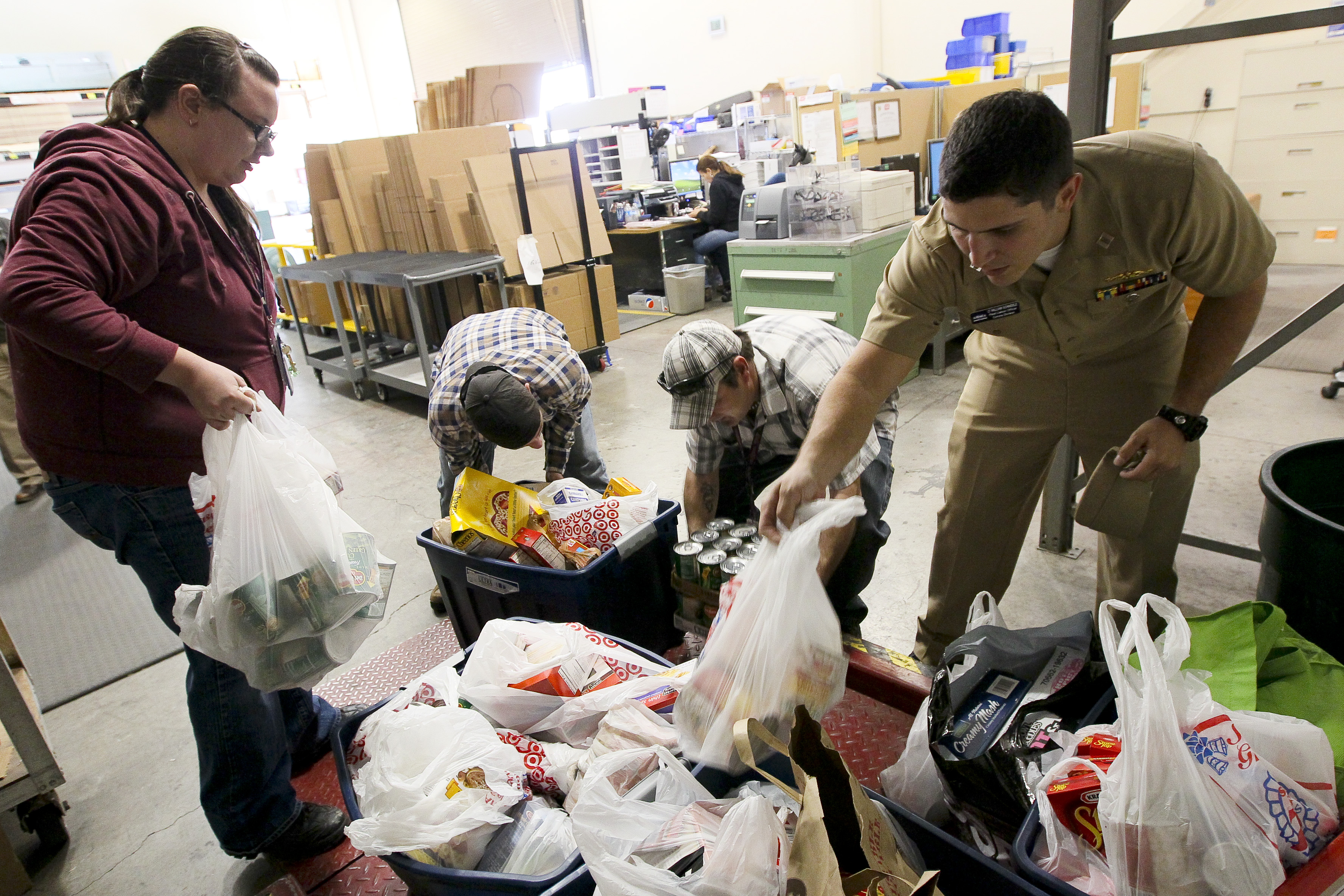
Volunteers weigh food drive donations.

== Europe ==
The first European food bank was opened in France in 1984. The first food bank in Italy was established in 1989. Similar to the UK's experience, food banks have become much more common across continental Europe since the crisis that began in 2008.

In Spain, food banks can operate on the warehouse model, supplying a network of surrounding soup kitchens and other food relief agencies. The Spanish federation of food banks helped to feed about 800,000 people during 2008–2011, according to the Carrefour Foundation. By October 2014, Spain had 55 food banks in total, with the number who depend on them having increased to 1.5 million.

In Belgium, food banks helped about 121,000 people in 2012. That was an increase of about 4,500 compared with 2011, the biggest increase since the start of the 2008 crisis. Belgian food banks account for about 65% of all food aid given out within the country.

The number of food banks has increased rapidly in Germany, a country that weathered the crisis relatively well, and did not implement severe austerity measures. In 2012, professor Sabine Pfeiffer of the Munich University of Applied Sciences said there has been an "explosion" of food bank usage.

=== European Union programs ===
While many European food banks have long been run by civil society with no government assistance, an EU-funded project, the Most deprived persons program (MDP), had specialized in supplying food to marginalized people who are not covered by the benefits system and who were in some cases reluctant to approach the more formal food banks. The program involved the EU buying surplus agricultural products, which were then distributed to the poor largely by Catholic churches. The MDP was wound down in late 2013 and was replaced by the Fund for European Aid to the Most Deprived (FEAD), which is set to run until at least 2020. The FEAD program has a wider scope than the MDP, helping deprived people not just with food aid, but with social inclusion projects and housing. The actual methods employed by FEAD tend to vary from country to country, but in several EU states, such as Poland, its activities include helping to fund local food bank networks.

=== United Kingdom ===
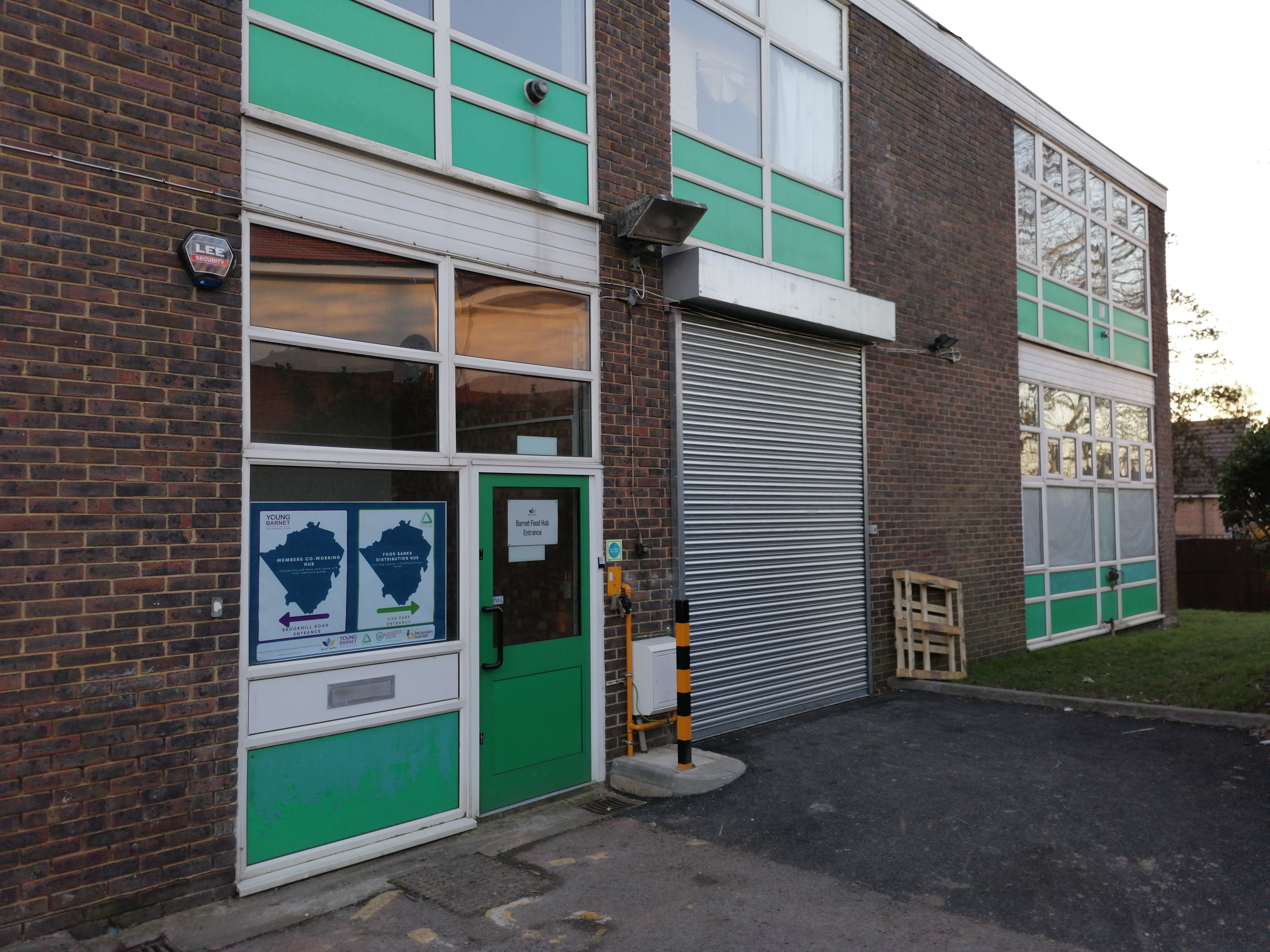
Barnet Food Hub, supplying food banks in the London Borough of Barnet. March 2021.

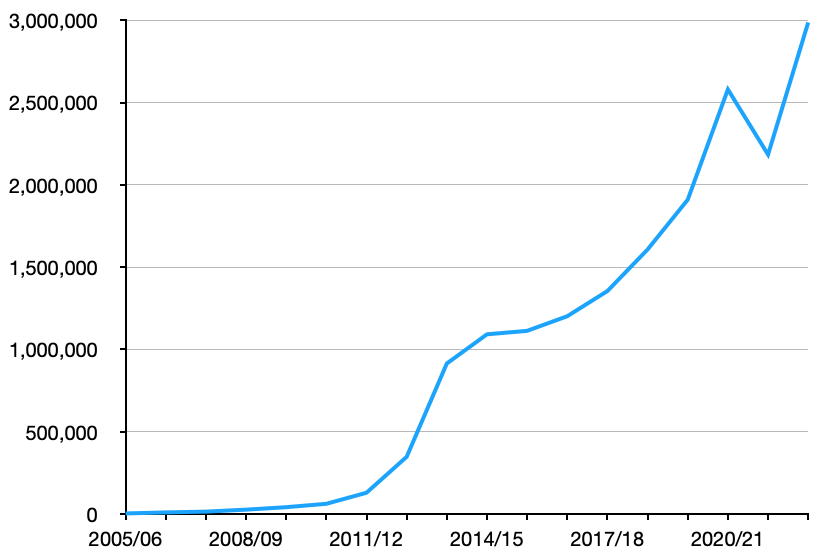
Food parcels given out by the Trussell Trust from 2005/06 to 2019/20

In 2022 there were over 2,572 UK food banks in the UK.

Professor Jon May, of Queen Mary University of London and the Independent Food Aid Network, said statistics showed a rapid rise in several food banks during the last five years.

There are now food banks in almost every community, from the East End of London to the Cotswolds. The spread of food banks maps growing problems of poverty across the UK, but also the growing drive among many thousands of people across the country to try and do something about those problems.

Though food banks were rarely seen in the UK in the second half of the twentieth century, their use has started to grow, especially in the 2000s, and have since dramatically expanded. The increase in the dependency on food banks has been blamed by some, such as Guardian columnist George Monbiot, on the 2008 recession and the Conservative government's austerity policies. These policies included cuts to the welfare state and caps on the total amount of welfare support that a family can claim. The OECD found that the number of people who answered yes to the question "Have there been times in the past 12 months when you did not have enough money to buy food that you or your family needed?" has decreased from 9.8% in 2007 to 8.1% in 2012, with Spectator editor Toby Young speculating in 2015 that the initial rise was due to both more awareness of food banks, and Jobcentres referring people to food banks when they were hungry.

Rachel Loopstra, lecturer on nutrition at King's College London and food insecurity expert, said:

Recent national survey data suggests that 8% of adults experienced not having enough money for food over 2016 – this figure is likely to be many times more than the number helped by food banks. We need ongoing national survey monitoring to understand the scale of food insecurity, who is at risk, and the implications for child and adult health and wellbeing.

Those who are short of food are likely to frequently also be short of other essential products, like shampoo and basic hygiene products (e.g. soap, toilet rolls and sanitary products). Some people must choose between buying food and buying basic toiletries.

As of January 2014, the largest group co-ordinating UK food banks was The Trussell Trust, a Christian charity based organization in Salisbury. About 43% of the UK's food banks were run by Trussell, about 20% by smaller church networks such as Besom and Basic, about 31% were independent, and about 4% were run by secular food bank networks such as Fare Share and Food Cycle.

Before the 2008 credit crunch, food banks were "almost unheard of" in the UK. In 2004, Trussell only ran two food banks. In 2011, about one new food bank was being opened per week. In 2012, the Trussell Trust reported that the rate of new openings had increased to three per week. In August, the rate of new openings spiked to four per week, with three new food banks being opened in that month for Nottingham alone. In 2022 the number of food banks run by Trussell had risen to over 1,400.

Most UK food banks are hosted by churches in partnership with the wider community. They operate on the "frontline" model, giving out food directly to the hungry. Over 90% of the food given out is donated by the public, including schools, churches, businesses and individuals. The Trussell Trust had aimed to provide short-term support for people whose needs have not yet been addressed by official state welfare provision; those who had been "falling into the cracks in the system". The Trussell franchise has procedures which aim to prevent long-term dependency on their services and to ensure that those in need are referred to qualified outside agencies. The charity suggests that the credit crunch caused an upsurge in the number of people needing emergency food.

Since 2010, demand for food banks continued to increase, and at a more rapid rate, partly as austerity began to take effect, and partly as those on low incomes began to draw down savings and run out of friends of whom they were willing to ask for help. Unlike soup kitchens, (Note: Soup kitchens will typically feed anyone if they have food available, but they can often only provide a single meal. A food bank on the other hand will typically give a package of food sufficient to last for several days.) most, but not all UK food banks are unable to help people who come in off the street without a referral – instead, they operate with a referral system. Vouchers are handed out to those in need by various sorts of frontline care professionals, such as social workers, health visitors, Citizens Advice Bureaux, Jobcentres and housing officials. The voucher can typically be exchanged at the food bank for a package of food sufficient to last three days. The year to April 2013 saw close to 350,000 referrals to Trussell Trust foodbanks, more than double the amount from the previous year.

Several food banks have been set up outside of the Trussell system, some faith-based, others secular in part as they do not like having to turn away people without referrals, although Trussell Trust food banks do help clients in need without vouchers to get one as quickly as possible. There is also FareShare, a London-based charity which operates some nineteen depots on the American-style warehouse model. Rather than giving out food directly to individuals, FareShare distributes food to over 700 smaller agencies, mainly smaller independent operations like soup kitchens and breakfast clubs. Great emphasis is placed on reducing food waste as well as relieving food poverty. FareShare operates on a business basis, employing several Managers to oversee operations alongside their army of volunteers. Employee costs constituted over 50% of their expenditure in both 2011 and 2012.

People who turn to food banks are typically grateful both for the food and for the warmth and kindness they receive from the volunteers. However, sometimes food banks have run out of supplies by the time they arrive. Some find it humiliating to have to ask for food, and the packages they receive do not always seem nutritious. Some food banks have tried to respond with innovative programs; London Street Food bank for example began asking donors to send in supermarket vouchers so that those they serve will be able to choose food that best meets their nutritional needs.

The Trussell Trust revealed a 47% increase in several three-day emergency supplies provided by their food banks in December 2016 compared to the monthly average for the 2016–17 financial year. Public donations in December 2016 meant foodbanks met the increased need in that month, but donations in January, February and March 2017 all fell below the monthly average of 931 tonnes for the 2016–17 financial year.

Although going for a few years by various small charities around the world, 2017 saw a significant increase in media coverage and take up of the reverse advent calendar. The UK Money bloggers campaign encouraging the public to give something to a food bank every day for 25 days was covered by The Mirror, The Guardian and others. Emma Revie of The Trussell Trust said, "for too many people, staying above water is a daily struggle".

Food bank use has increased since Universal Credit was implemented as part of the Welfare Reform Act 2012. Delays in providing the first payment force claimants to use food banks, also Universal Credit does not provide enough to cover basic living expenses. Claiming Universal Credit is complex and the system is hard to navigate, as many claimants cannot afford internet access and cannot access online help with claiming. A report by The Trussell Trust says:

Rather than acting as a service to ensure people do not face destitution, the evidence suggests that for people on the very lowest incomes ... the poor functioning of universal credit can actually push people into a tide of bills, debts and, ultimately, lead them to a food bank. People are falling through the cracks in a system not made to hold them. What little support available is primarily offered by the third sector, whose work is laudable, but cannot be a substitute for a real, nationwide safety net.

UK food banks appealed for volunteers and supplies, fearing an increase in demand for food as Universal Credit was rolled out further.

UK food bank users

According to a May 2013 report by Oxfam and Church Action on Poverty, about half a million Britons had used food banks. The Trussell Trust reports that their food banks alone helped feed 346,992 people in 2012–13. Numbers using food banks more than doubled during the period 2012–13. Reasons why people have difficulty getting enough to eat include redundancy, sickness, delays over receiving, domestic violence, family breakdown, debt, and additional fuel costs in winter. Some clients of foodbanks are at work but cannot afford everything they need due to low pay.

Close to half of those needing to use food banks have had issues with their benefit payments. Sanctioning benefits was the single most frequent reason for food bank referrals and there has been criticism over sanctions being imposed for allegedly spurious reasons.

A joint report from the Trussell Trust, the Church of England, and the charities Oxfam and Child Poverty Action Group found that food bank users were more likely to live in rented accommodation, be single adults or lone parents, be unemployed, and have experienced a "sanction", where their unemployment benefits were cut for at least one month.

Delays in payment of Housing Benefit, disability benefits and other benefits and general bureaucratic issues with benefits can force people to use food banks. Many further people who need food banks have low-income jobs but struggle to afford food after making debt repayments and all other expenses. Low-paid workers, part-time workers and those with zero-hour contracts are particularly vulnerable to financial crisis and sometimes need the assistance of food banks. As had been predicted, demand for food banks further increased after cuts to welfare came into effect in April 2013, which included the abolition of Crisis loans. In April 2014, Trussell reported that they had handed out 913,000 food parcels in the last year, up from 347,000 the year before. Several councils have begun looking at funding food banks to increase their capability, as cuts to their budgets mean they will be less able to help vulnerable people directly.

Sabine Goodwin, an Independent Food Aid Network researcher, said most food bank workers reported increasing demand for food aid.

Many feel they are firefighting, finding a way to deal with the logistics of feeding more and more people, with no time to advocate for changes that would eradicate the need for food banks in the first place.

UK government

According to an all-party parliamentary report released in December 2014, key reasons for the increased demand for UK foodbanks are delays in paying benefits, welfare sanctions, and the recent reversal of the post-WWII trend for poor people's incomes to rise above or in line with increased costs for housing, utility bills and food.

In 2013, the UK Government blocked a £22,000,000 European Union fund to help finance food banks in the UK. This disappointed Labour MEP, Richard Howitt, who assisted in negotiating the fund. Howitt stated:

It is very sad that our government is opposing this much-needed help for foodbanks on the basis that it is a national responsibility, when in reality it has no intention of providing the help itself. The only conclusion is that Conservative anti-European ideology is being put before the needs of the most destitute and deprived in our society.

Haroon Siddiqui said that the rise in food bank use coincided with the imposition of austerity and feels the government is reluctant to admit the obvious link. Siddiqui said that during the 2017 general election campaign, Conservative Prime Minister Theresa May was asked about even nurses (then subject to a 1% annual pay freeze) using food banks and May merely replied,

"There are many complex reasons why people go to food banks." Siddiqui wrote further, "[...] the reasons people turn to food banks are quite plain (and there have been studies that support them). The Trussell Trust, the UK's biggest food bank network, has said that they help people with "nowhere else to turn". Earlier [in 2018] it said that food banks in areas where the full Universal Credit service had been in place for 12 months or more were four times as busy.

Then-UK Prime Minister David Cameron said in the House of Commons in 2012 that he welcomed the efforts of food banks. Caroline Spelman, his Secretary of State for Environment, Food and Rural Affairs, has described food banks as an "excellent example" of active citizenship. Labour MP Kate Green has a different view, feeling that the rise of food banks reflects people being let down by the state welfare system, saying: "I feel a real burning anger about them ... People are very distressed at having to ask for food; it's humiliating and distressing." Cookery writer and poverty campaigner Jack Monroe wrote that those referred to food banks or given vouchers were "the lucky ones with a good doctor or health visitor who knows us well enough to recognize that something has gone seriously wrong" and expressed concern for those who lack this support.

Food banks need extra donations during the summer holidays because school children do not receive free school meals during that time.

=== Germany ===
As of 2013, there were over 900 food banks (called "Tafel") in Germany, up from just 1 in 1993. In 2014, 1.5 million people a week used food banks in Germany. In 2022, that rose to nearly two million people.

=== France ===
In total, around 3.5 million people rely on food banks in France. One provider, the Banque Alimentaire, has over 100 branches in France, serving 200 million meals a year to 1.85 million people.

== Asia ==
Several Asian places have begun to use food banks; these include Nepal, South Korea, Japan, Taiwan and Singapore.

=== Hong Kong ===
The first food bank in Hong Kong is Feeding Hong Kong, which was founded in 2009. Food Angel is also a food bank in Hong Kong, as is the Foodlink Foundation.

=== Japan ===
According to the Ministry of Agriculture, Forestry and Fisheries in Japan, the number of such organizations stood at 178 in the 2022 fiscal year through March, marking a significant increase from the 120 seen two years earlier. As of 2022, there is at least one food bank organization in every prefecture in Japan. The importance of food banks has become more recognized during the COVID-19 pandemic.

=== Singapore ===
Founded in 2012, Food Bank Singapore is a registered charity and part of the Global Food Banking Network that has an outreach of over 50 countries. Food from the Heart and Jamiyah FoodBank are two other food banks in the food-insecure nation of Singapore.

== Africa ==
The Egyptian Food Bank was established in Cairo in 2006, and less than ten years later, food banks run on similar principles spread to other Arab countries in North Africa and the Middle East.

In Sub-Saharan Africa, there are charity-run food banks that operate on a semi-commercial system that differs from both the more common "warehouse" and "frontline" models. In some rural least developed countries such as Malawi, food is often relatively cheap and plentiful for the first few months after the harvest but then becomes more and more expensive. Food banks in those areas can buy large amounts of food shortly after the harvest, and then as food prices start to rise, they sell it back to local people throughout the year at well below market prices. Such food banks will sometimes also act as centres to provide smallholders and subsistence farmers with various forms of support.

Formed in 2009, Food Bank South Africa is South Africa's national food banking network and a member of the Global Food Banking Network.

== Climate change ==
Food banking and related models have been proposed as a key solution to the reduction greenhouse gas emissions. Around 8% of total emissions are due to food loss and waste. Through food rescue programs, food banks help reduce emissions by ensuring the productive use of energy involved in the production of food and by diverting food away from landfills, where it would have spoiled and generated methane and other greenhouse gasses. One estimate puts the greenhouse gas avoidance from food banks at more than 1.7 million tons in 2021.

== Reactions and concerns ==
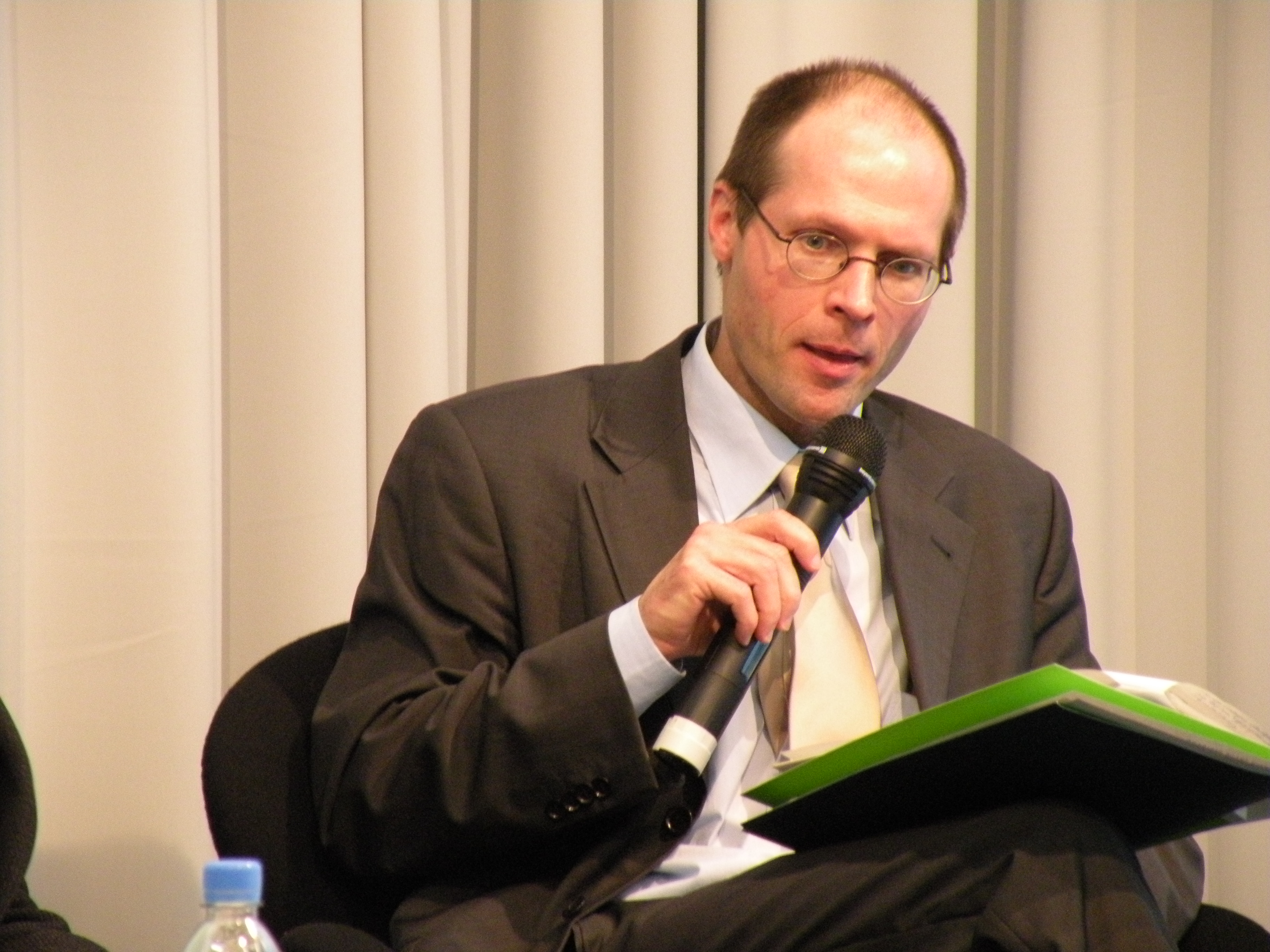
Olivier De Schutter, a senior United Nations official, has cautioned Europe against allowing food banks to become a permanent partial replacement for welfare provision, as is the case in the US and Canada.

The rise of food banks has been "broadly welcomed". For it is said that "not only do they provide a solution to the problem of hunger that does not require resources from the state", but they can be viewed "as evidence of increasing community spirit and of active, caring citizenship". In the UK for example, Patrick Butler, society editor for The Guardian, has said that:

"Many politicians and campaigners are fascinated by the possibilities of food banks. After the initial shock that "things have come to this" there is, on the left of the political spectrum, a nervous excitement about the potential for community self-help. On the right, there is outright enthusiasm for what is seen as "big society" welfare in its purest form."

There has also been concern expressed about food banks by some researchers and politicians. Drawing on the United States's experience after the rapid rise of food banks in the 1980s, American Sociology professor Janet Poppendieck warned that the rise of food banks can contribute to the long-term erosion of human rights and support for welfare systems. Once food banks become well established, it can be politically impossible to return responsibility for meeting the needs of hungry people to the state.

Poppendieck says that the logistics of running food banks can be so demanding that they prevent kind-hearted people from having time to participate in public policy advocacy; yet she also says if they can be encouraged to lobby politicians for long-term changes, that would help those on a low income. They often have considerable credibility with legislators. As of 2012, senior US food bank staff members have "expressed a preference" to remain politically neutral/refused to take a stand, which political activists have suggested may relate to their sources of funding/political pressure.

The emergence of "Little Free Food Pantries" and "Blessing Boxes", modelled on the "Little Free Libraries" boxes, has been criticized as "feel-good local philanthropy" which is too small to make a significant impact on hunger, for its lack of access to fresh foods, for food safety concerns, and as a public relations effort by Tyson Foods, which seeks to cut federal SNAP food assistance in the US.

Rachel Loopstra from University of Toronto has said food banks are often inefficient, unreliable and unable to supply nutritional food. She said a survey in Toronto found that only 1 in 5 families suffering from food insecurity would turn to food banks, in part because there is a stigma associated with having to do so. Elizabeth Dowler, Professor of Food & Social Policy at University of Warwick, said that most British people prefer the state to take responsibility for helping the hungry. Hannah Lambie-Mumford, from University of Sheffield, echoed the view that some users of food banks find having to ask for food humiliating, and also that food bank volunteers should be encouraged to advocate for long-term solutions to the underlying causes of poverty and hunger.

Olivier De Schutter, a senior United Nations official charged with ensuring governments honour their obligation to safeguard their citizens' right to food, has expressed alarm at the rise of food banks. He has reminded the governments of the advanced economies in Europe and Canada that they have a "duty to protect" their citizens from hunger, and suggested that leaving such an obligation to food banks may be an abuse of human rights.

Other criticism expresses alarm at "transnational corporate food banking which construct[s] domestic hunger as a matter for charity, thereby allowing indifferent and austerity-minded governments to ignore increasing poverty and food insecurity and their moral, legal and political obligations, under international law, to realize the right to food."

== See also ==
- Ag Against Hunger
- Canstruction
- Bill Emerson Good Samaritan Act of 1996
- Food Not Bombs
- Food security
- Gleaners
- Good Shepherd Food Bank
- Hopelink
- List of food banks
- National Association of Letter Carriers' Stamp Out Hunger Food Drive
- Northwest Harvest
- Olio (app)
- Poverty
