= Vicky Lau =

Hong Kong Chinese chef

- Born: Hong Kong
- Education: New York University / Le Cordon Bleu
- Culinary career
- Cooking style: Innovative French / Chinese
- Current restaurants: TATE Dining Room ( ); Mora (Green Michelin Star)
- Awards won: Asia’s Best Female Chef 2015; Chef of the Year Tatler 2023
- Website: www.tate.com.hk/links

Vicky Lau, a culinary entrepreneur born in Hong Kong, is the founder and head chef of Tate Dining Room, a restaurant awarded two-Michelin star, and green Michelin star Mora. In 2015, she was named the Best Female Chef in Asia by Asia's 50 Best Restaurants.

== Early life ==
Hong Kong-native Vicky Lau moved to the United States at the age of 15, where she attended a boarding school in Connecticut. She attended New York University, studying graphic communication. Following this she worked in advertising for six years and became graphic designer of a design agency.

After returning to Hong Kong in 2010, she enrolled in a nine-month course at Le Cordon Bleu in Bangkok, Thailand, and earned a Grand Diplôme. She then entered the fine dining sector to increase her experience in culinary expertise.

== Culinary career ==
Following her graduation from Le Cordon Bleu, Vicky Lau pursued a culinary career at Cepage, a restaurant awarded one Michelin star, under the guidance of Chef Sebastien Lepinoy. After a year, she established her own restaurant, TATE Dining Room & Bar, which was originally positioned on Elgin Street in Central, Hong Kong.

== TATE Dining Room ==
TATE Dining Room & Bar opened its doors on Elgin Street in 2012 and received a one Michelin Star rating in 2013. Initially, the cuisine offered by Cheffe Lau featured a fusion of French and Japanese influences.
In 2016, the restaurant relocated to a larger venue on Hollywood Road, where Lau began to incorporate more elements of her Chinese heritage into the menu.
The restaurant became a member of the Relais & Châteaux association in 2018.
TATE Dining Room was recognized with two Michelin star in 2021, marking Cheffe Lau as the first female chef in Asia to achieve this level of distinction. As of 2024, TATE Dining Room continues to offer an innovative dining experience that marries various Chinese culinary traditions with Western techniques.

== MORA ==
Mora, founded by Cheffe Lau, began operations in 2021 on Upper Lascar Row, a historic street. The restaurant's culinary concept is focused on dishes that highlight the versatility of soy. Since 2022, Mora has held a Michelin Green Star, reflecting its commitment to sustainability in its operations.

== Accolades & Roles ==
・ 2015, Asia’s best female chef by The World's 50 Best Restaurants.
・ 2021, The Best Chef Food Art Award by The Best Chef.
・ 2021, Board Member of Feeding Hong Kong.
・ 2021, Woman of Power by Prestige Hong Kong.
・ 2023, Chef of the Year by Tatler.
