= John van Hengel =

Inventor of food banks (1923–2005)

- Born: February 21, 1923; Waupun, Wisconsin
- Died: October 5, 2005 (aged 82); Phoenix, Arizona
- Education: Lawrence College
- Known for: Father of Food Banking
- Children: 2
- Awards: See honors and awards

John Arnold van Hengel (February 21, 1923 – October 5, 2005) was a grassroots activist and entrepreneur credited as being the "Father of Food Banking". In 1967, van Hengel founded St. Mary's Food Bank, the world's first food bank in Phoenix, Arizona. He would later go on to create Feeding America, helping to spread the food banking concept across the United States, and eventually the rest of the world.

== Early years ==
John van Hengel was born in Waupun, Wisconsin. Of Dutch ancestry, he was the son of a nurse and the town pharmacist. He graduated from Lawrence College in Appleton, Wisconsin with a degree in Government. There, He was a member of Delta Tau Delta fraternity. John then attended graduate school at University of Wisconsin but moved to Southern California before finishing. Spending time as a self-described "first-rate beach bum", van Hengel moved on to study broadcasting at UCLA.

His odd jobs included driving a beer truck in Beverly Hills, designing plastic rainwear, a sales manager for Bear Archery and a magazine publicist. John married his wife and had two sons. In 1960 his marriage ended in divorce, and he headed back to Wisconsin and went to work in a rock quarry. He became partially paralyzed while breaking up a bar fight. He was sent to Arizona for rehabilitation through the guidance of Barrows Neurological Institute.

John regained his strength swimming laps in a YMCA swimming pool and at the age of 44 became the oldest public lifeguard in Phoenix, Arizona.

== Start of the Food Bank journey ==
John took a vow of poverty upon starting his life in Phoenix. A devout Roman Catholic, John began working at Immaculate Heart Church where he drove the bus and coached sports. He also began volunteering at the very busy St. Vincent de Paul Soup Kitchen.

John bought an old milk delivery truck for $150 and used it to gather gleaned citrus fruit and other foods to bring to the soup kitchen. Every evening John would deliver any surplus to the homeless missions in downtown Phoenix. Searching for an efficient, less time consuming method of distributing this food, John approached Father Ronald Colloty from St. Mary's Basilica in regards to setting up a warehouse where the missions could come and pick up the food. The church responded by loaning John $3000 and an inherited bakery building near skid row.

In this first year of using this building, around 250,000 pounds of food was distributed to 36 charities.

John expanded his food resources upon a discovery behind local grocery stores. A destitute mother of 10 well-fed children pointed out “a bank of food” from which she fed her family. Huge amounts of surplus food were being thrown out by grocery stores, food that was frozen but still edible, loose vegetables, stale bread. Inside stores John found less perishable throwaways such as dented cans and leaky bags of rice and sugar.

Within a year, in 1967, John had established the location at which all the food that grocery stores could not sell would be housed and distributed. He named it St. Mary's Food Bank in honor of the donation provided by St. Mary's Basilica. In accordance with his vow of poverty, John took no salary during his first decade at St. Mary's. He wore secondhand clothes, got his food at the food bank and lived in a donated room above a garage.

== Second Harvest and Global Food Banking ==
In 1975 John accepted a $50,000 federal grant which would be utilized to establish 18 food banks across America. In 1979 John established America's Second Harvest (now known as Feeding America since 2008). Guided by John, this organization established food banking standards and training as well as acquisition and distribution of food from large national manufacturers. Businesses were able to cut the costs of disposing unusable but edible food as well as taking tax breaks by helping multiple charities.

In 1983 John left America's Second Harvest to establish Food Banking Inc. (which became International Food Bank Services in 1991 and is now known as Global FoodBanking Network). John served as a consultant to food banks around the world, traveling to Canada, Mexico, Belgium and Spain to oversee the start up of their food banks. John also helped establish food banks throughout Africa, Eastern Europe, Asia, South America and Australia.

== Death ==
Van Hengel died of Parkinson's disease on October 5, 2005.

== Honors and awards ==
- 1972 Phoenix Valley Leadership Man of the Year
- 1972 Phoenix Advertising Club Man of The Year
- 1972 National Center for Volunteer Action National Volunteer Award
- 1980 Salvation Army Centennial Award
- 1989 Pillsbury's Pioneer Award at US Conference of Mayors
- 1992 Norman Vincent Peale's America Award for Ingenuity presented at the Kennedy Center
- 1992 National Caring Award
- 1994 Commendatory Knight of the Papal Order of St. Gregory the Great
- 2003 108th Congress Congressional Record Award for humanitarian work
- 2003 National Association of Home Care and Hospice – Mother Teresa Lifetime Achievement Award
