= Family centre =

Community resources that provide services to parents, children, and spouses

Family centres are community resources that provide services to parents, children, and spouses.

Family centres exist to provide need-based aid to families affected by a range of events, including death, physical and mental illness, divorce, unemployment, child abuse and child neglect. They have been created by different local government departments, or by different agencies, in order to fulfill three basic functions:

- Social services
- Education
- Training

The social services initiative focuses on creating better relationships within the family, providing preventative services to children in need or at risk, and providing companionship to seniors. The Education initiative focuses on improving the interaction between families and the local schools as well as providing remedial facilities to children. The training initiative focuses on providing parenting and job training classes.

== Services ==
Family centers typically include a range of services intended to help families, particularly in poverty-stricken areas. They typically focus on improving communications between family members, and between family members and social service organisations. Centres often encourage their clients to participate in volunteer work and assist them in doing so. Many family centres are intended to be a safe space for families that are frequently in a crisis mode. The centres are intended as a place of stability and support, and include mediation training and services.

Specific services include daycares, classes, and activities.

There are three typical approaches used by individual family centres. The social service approach focuses on supporting families, including offering classes and activities and counseling for those who want it. The education approach focuses on teaching families to navigate the social service and school systems. The training approach focuses on providing skills to family members. Despite these different focuses, the goals are typically the same, and usually involve teaching families better ways to communicate with each other and society.

Many clients at family centres are struggling through personal crises, such as divorce, illness, or depression. They often have poor educational backgrounds and a history of low-skill and low-wage jobs. Family centres aim to build confidence and skills allowing their clients to seek education and better job opportunities.

== Outcomes ==
A 2005 study showed that family centres provide positive results for individuals, families, and communities. The improvement for individuals is largely through the free education programs. Improvement for families is through improved communications. And improvement for communities is through the additional volunteer work by clients in family centre programs.

While most family centres prefer to work with entire families, in practice, they typically only work with one member of a family, typically the mother. Even when other family members are involved, fathers often do not participate because they do not believe it is their role to be involved. Many of the mothers involved in such programs were seeking to depart from the traditional authoritarian styles they had been raised in.

Studies find benefits for most, but not all, families involved in family centre programs.

== History ==
The earliest predecessors to family centres were children's houses. These actively encouraged children to volunteer to maintain the house while offering them training and transportation. They also allowed the children to participate in the governance of the houses. The houses would grow food and distribute them for free to those who help cultivate it. They also offered free training to children in how to make repairs and manage a household, with the children doing the maintenance, cooking, and cleaning.

Beginning in the 1950 were established in poor areas of English cities. These offered free classes, activities, and provided nurses and legal aid to families. They also offered the use of equipment and supplies, such as for carpentry or sewing.

By the 1980s, both children's houses and urban centres had adopted the name community social centres. The current name of family centre became prominent in the 1990s. While family centres in urban areas are successful and expanding, many in rural areas have been closing down, or converted to part-time status.
