= Feeding Hong Kong =

Food bank in Hong Kong

- Founded: 2011
- Founder: Gabrielle Kirstein
- Type: Food Bank
- Purpose: Fight hunger, reduce food waste
- Location: Unit 715-717, Block A2, Yau Tong Industrial City, 17-25 Ko Fai Road, Yau Tong, Kowloon, Hong Kong
- Key people: Gabrielle Kirstein (Executive Director)
- Website: feedinghk.org

Feeding Hong Kong (Chinese: 樂餉社; Jyutping: lok6 hoeng2 se5) is a food bank in Hong Kong. It is an accredited member of The Global FoodBanking Network.

Feeding Hong Kong is regarded as a food recycling operation, rather than a welfare group, so it does not receive public funding and relied on help from volunteers and donors.

== History ==
Feeding Hong Kong was founded as an independent registered charity in 2011 by Gabrielle Kirstein.

== Food Rescue ==
Feeding Hong Kong works with over 400 food companies and 150 charities to collect and redistribute surplus food. Food that is safe to eat but not sold during business hours is collected and distributed to partner charities. Canned and packaged food items with approaching sell-by dates, labeling errors, discontinued brands, surplus inventory, minor recipe variations or damaged packaging are also donated. The food is sorted and delivered to a network of partner charities, such as Bethune House, Crossroads Foundation, and Pok Oi Hospital, who provide food to the hungry in Hong Kong. Each consignment is tailored to meet the needs of the individual charity and those that rely on it.

Bread Run Logo

=== Bread Run ===
Twice a week, fresh bread and salads are rescued by volunteer "Bread Runners" from partner food stores such as Pret a Manger, Maxim's Cakes and Arome Bakery, that would typically be thrown away due to their short shelf life. Bread Runners visit 1–2 stores at closing time to pick up the surplus food and deliver them to a designated Feeding Hong Kong drop-off point. Feeding Hong Kong has a warehouse facility in Yau Tong and Tsuen Wan, which stores the collected food. All bread run donations are redistributed amongst their charity network the same night or first thing the following morning. Volunteers sign up for the bread run online through Eventbrite.

== Programmes ==
Feeding Hong Kong also raises awareness about poverty and food insecurity in Hong Kong and promotes healthy eating and nutritional education to vulnerable groups in Hong Kong. Two of their nutritional programs are 'Chefs in the Community' and 'Edible Gardens'.

‘Chefs in the Community’ is a volunteer scheme, which aims to pair culinary professionals with local charities to develop their existing food programmes. The Feeding Hong Kong Cookbooks collection contains recipes that have been specifically developed by some of Hong Kong’s leading culinary and nutrition professionals. It aims to support Feeding Hong Kong’s charity partners to provide nutritious, affordable and effortless recipes that can be used to create delicious dishes at home. They can be prepared with limited ingredients, equipment and space, making them suitable for food kitchens and food parcel distributors, as well as other cooks on a budget. They also teach and share the recipes through their Nutrition and Cooking Class series.

The 'Edible Garden' programme helps convert unused roof tops and other urban spaces into edible gardens that grow herbs, fruit and vegetables.

== See also ==
- List of food banks
