= Maxim's Cakes =

Hong Kong bakery chain

- Logo of Maxim's Cakes
- Native name: 美心西饼
- Type: Subsidiary
- Industry: Bakery
- Founded: 1972
- Founders: Wu Shun Tak and James Wu
- Headquarters: Hong Kong
- Parent: Maxim's Caterers
- Website: maximscakes.com.hk

Maxim’s Cakes is a Hong Kong-based bakery chain founded in 1972 under the Maxim’s Caterers group. As of 2023, it operates 148 outlets across the city, including 26 “Maxim’s Live Bakery” locations where baked goods are prepared on-site. Its presence is especially notable in MTR stations, where many branches cater to daily commuters.

== History ==
In 1963, the Hilton and Mandarin Hotels opened in Central Hong Kong, each featuring Western-style nightclubs. Maxim’s Group, which had originally planned to open a high-end Western nightclub in the same area, found itself unable to compete in terms of décor, celebrity performers, and other aspects. As a result, the company decided to close the nightclub and shift its focus to opening cafés. In 1964, Maxim’s Bakery was launched in Tsim Sha Tsui. When Ocean Terminal was completed in 1966, the first Maxim’s Café—Maxim’s Boulevard—opened there, also selling pastries, laying the foundation for what would become "Maxim’s Cakes." Following that, Maxim’s successively launched Maxim’s Bar, Maxim’s Coffee Corner, Maxim’s Fast Food, and Maxim’s Delicatessen.

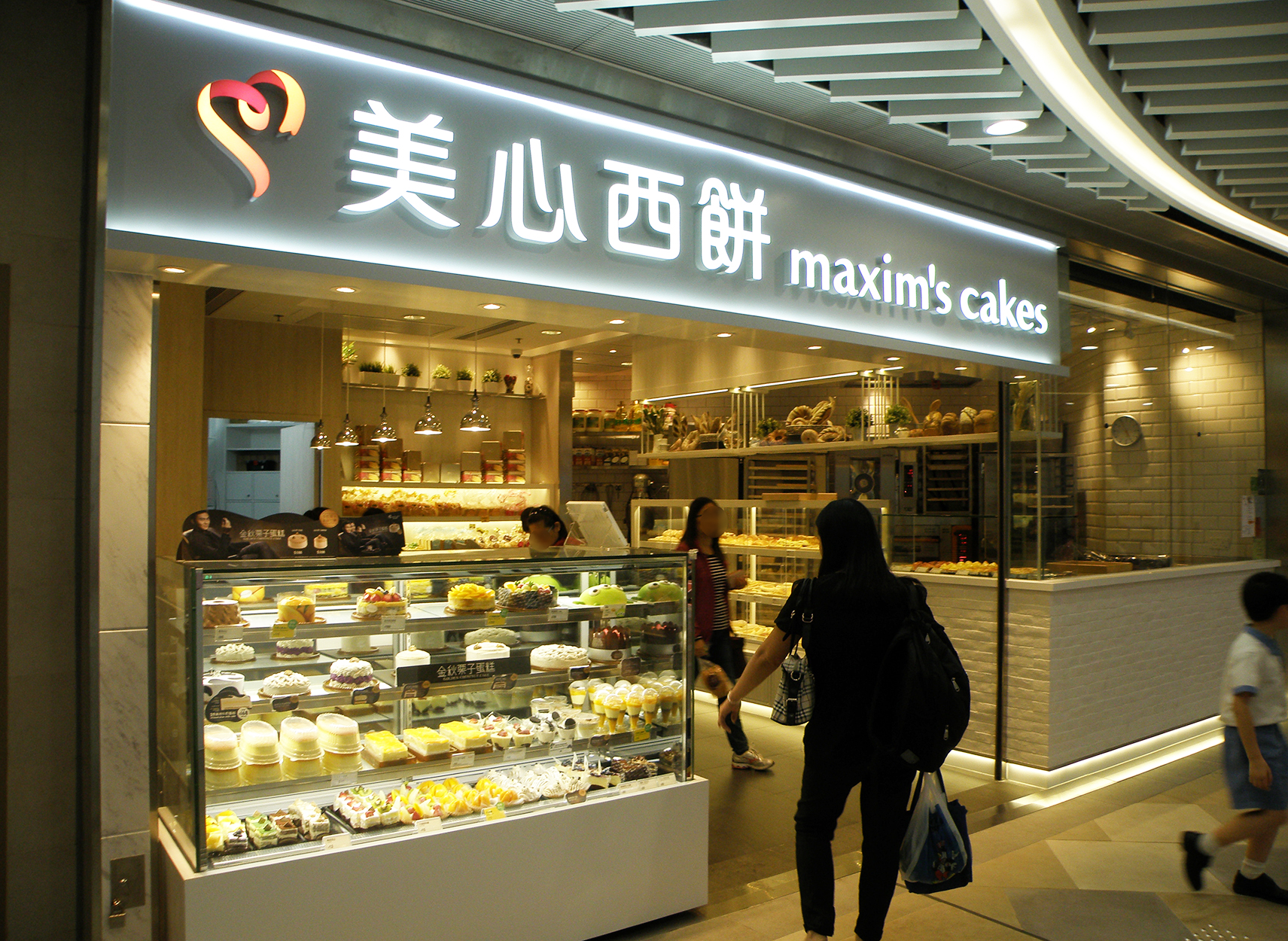
Maxim's Cakes in Yuen Long, Hong Kong.

In 1982, the MTR (then known as the Mass Transit Railway) issued a public tender for the operation of bakeries at stations along its line, but the industry showed little interest. Seizing the opportunity, Maxim’s became the sole bidder and leased shop spaces at multiple stations. By September of that year, Maxim’s Cakes had opened outlets at key MTR stations such as Mong Kok, Prince Edward, Wong Tai Sin, Choi Hung, Kowloon Bay, and Kwun Tong, becoming a pioneer in this business model. By the end of 1985, Maxim’s operated 33 bakery outlets in MTR stations, along with 37 additional outlets outside the stations—totaling 70 across Hong Kong—making it the bakery chain with the most locations in the city at that time. Wu Chim Tak, one of Maxim’s founders, explained that they anticipated customers would prefer buying pastries conveniently at stations like Shau Kei Wan on their way home, instead of carrying them all the way from Central. This was seen as a major opportunity, and the station-based shops were therefore designed to focus primarily on takeaway service. Later, in 1988 and again in 2003, Maxim’s expanded into all stations along the Kowloon–Canton Railway (now the MTR East Rail Line) and the Kowloon–Southern Railway (now the MTR West Rail Line, excluding Kam Sheung Road Station).

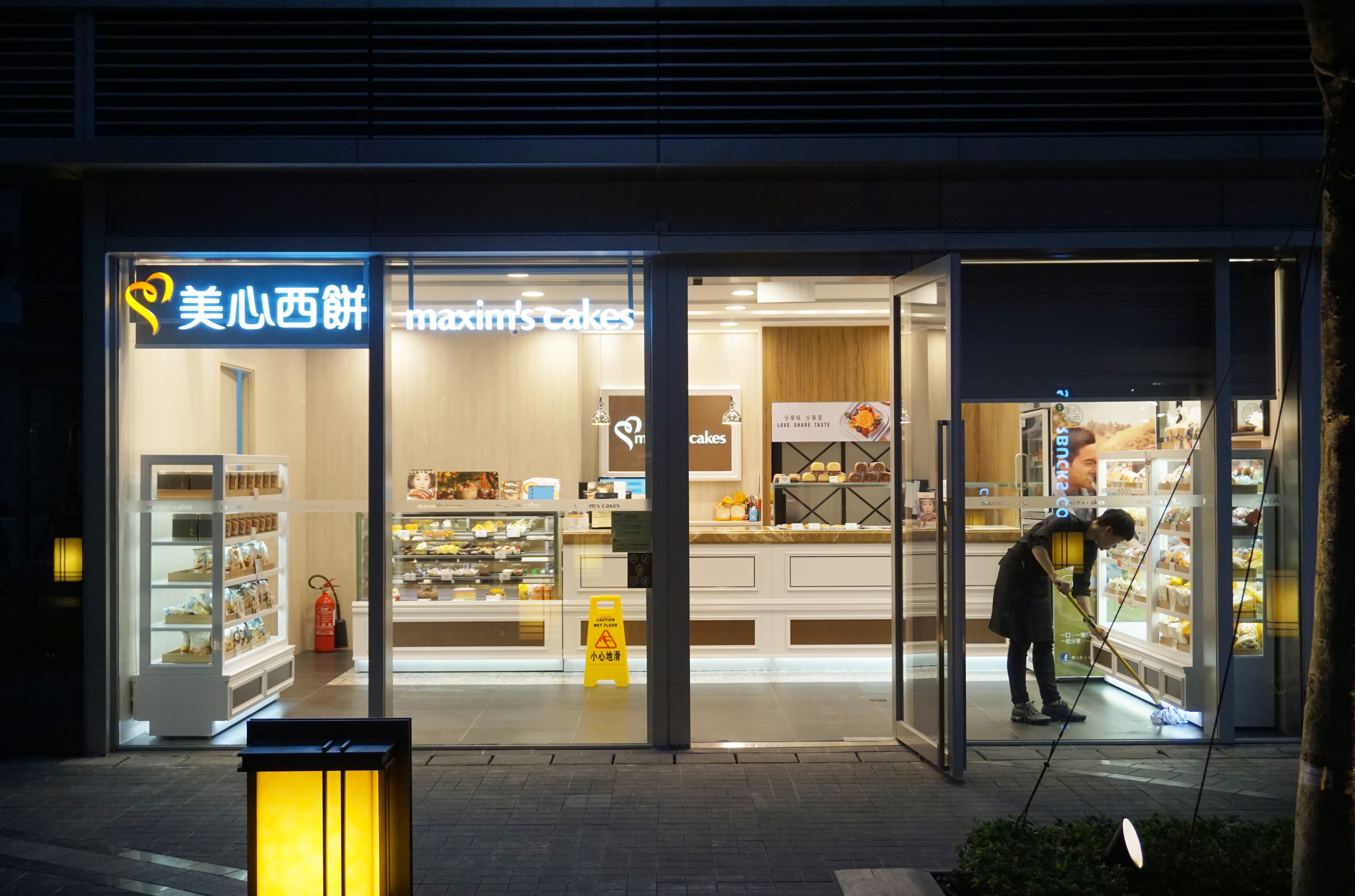
Century Link in Tung Chung, Hong Kong.

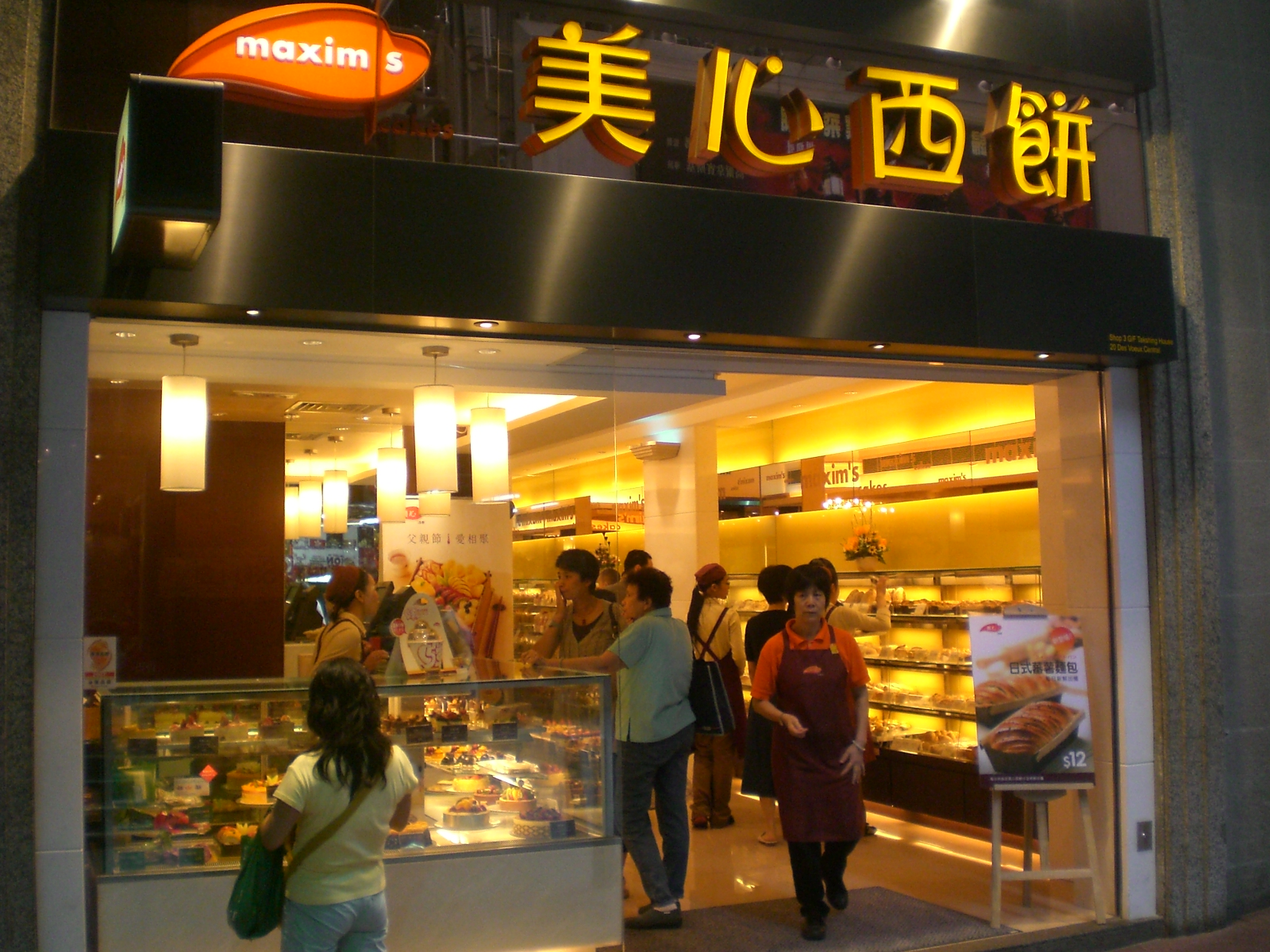
HK Central Theatre Lane Maxims shop

In 1993, Maxim’s opened bakeries in two prime locations: Huanshi Station in Guangzhou and North Sichuan Road in Shanghai. In early 1994, additional outlets were launched in the Hongmian District of Guangzhou and the Xuhui Districtof Shanghai. By mid-1994, more bakeries were opened in Foshan and on Tianshan North Road in Shanghai. Unfortunately, the company’s operations in the Chinese market suffered financial losses, ultimately leading to its withdrawal. Reflecting on the experience, Wu Chim Tak explained that although foreign investment was permitted to operate restaurants through joint ventures at the time, the general managers Maxim’s sent to oversee product quality and operations often struggled to coordinate with the Chinese counterparts responsible for human resources and government affairs. This lack of alignment led to operational difficulties. Additionally, the high-end consumer market in China was still in its infancy. At that time, most people could get full at a local restaurant for six or seven yuan, while a Maxim’s meal in Guangzhou cost fifteen yuan. Since the market was not yet ready, the company had no choice but to temporarily exit.

In the 1990s, Maxim’s Cakes adopted a rose motif as its new logo, replacing the previous design that shared the same branding as the rest of the group. In 2001, the logo was redesigned into a gender-neutral heart-shaped leaf by designer Alan Chan Yung-choon, a design that has remained in use to this day.

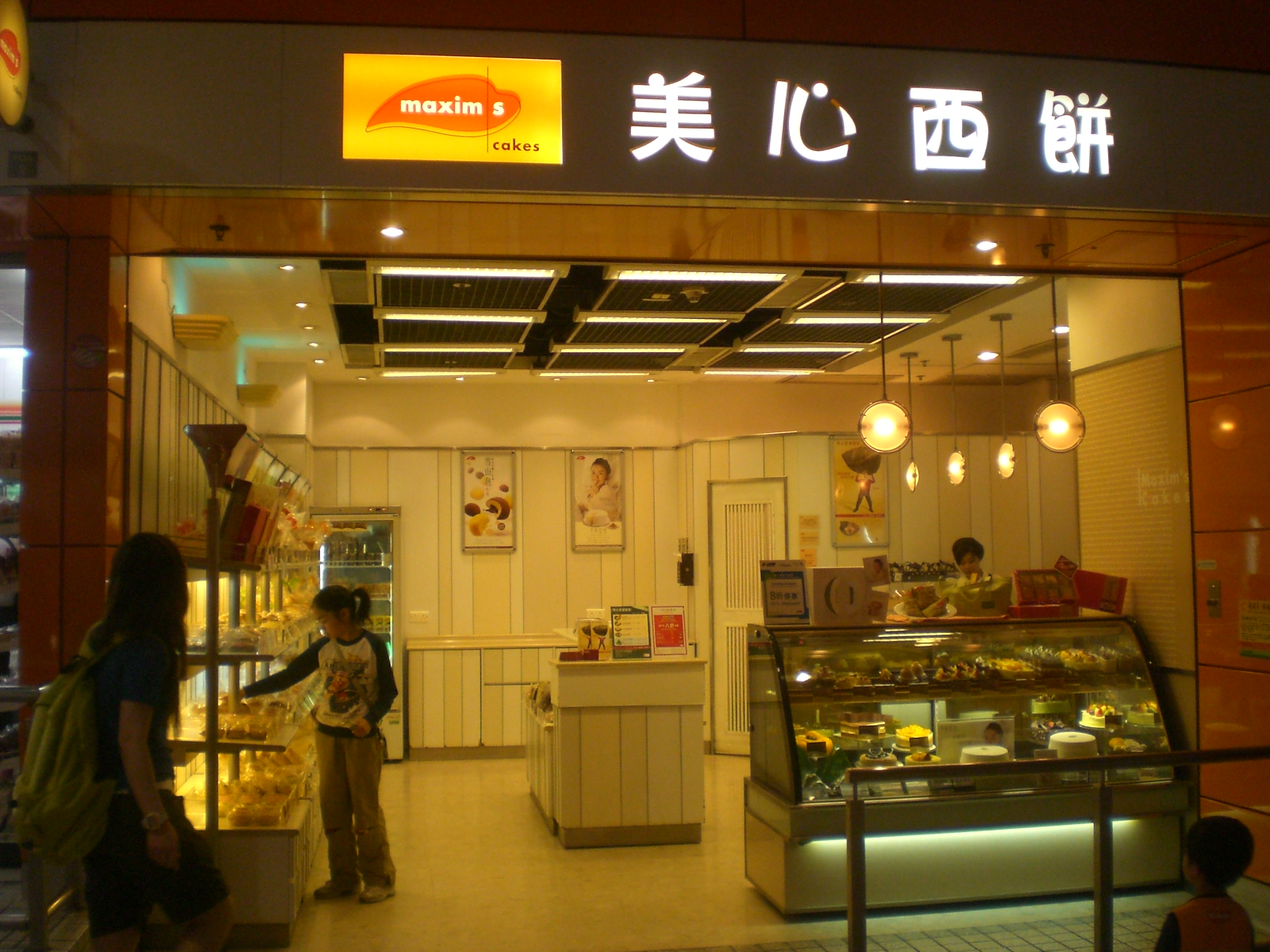
HK Tseung Kwan O Po Lam Metro City 2 Shop Maxim s Cakes

In the 1990s, Maxim’s launched bakery brands such as “Honey Maid Bakery” and “Bread House,” but these were gradually phased out in the 2000s as the company reverted to the “Maxim’s Cakes” brand.

In June 2005, under the Closer Economic Partnership Arrangement (CEPA), Maxim’s Cakes returned to Guangzhou, establishing a large-scale bakery facility and opening multiple retail outlets.

In September 2008, coinciding with mooncake ambassador Kelly Chen’s wedding in October, several branches offered special “Maxim’s Wedding Pastries.”

== Other Brands ==
=== Maxim's Deluxe ===
Maxim's Deluxe is a Hong Kong bakery and pastry chain under the Maxim’s Caterers brand, operating five outlets. The brand is also used for seasonal and festive products. The first store was established at Hong Kong International Airport, offering standard “Maxim’s Cakes” items along with additional options such as toasted bread and hot beverages. Other urban branches are largely indistinguishable from regular Maxim’s Cakes stores.

== Controversies ==
On October 2, 2019, a customer purchased a pork floss seaweed mochi bun from a Maxim’s Cakes branch at Butterfly Plaza in Tuen Mun. After storing it properly for two days, they discovered a 4-centimeter-long gecko inside the bun. When the customer returned to the store to complain, staff offered an apology. The Food and Environmental Hygiene Department later prosecuted Maxim’s, and the case was brought before the Tuen Mun Magistrates' Court in January 2021. The company pleaded guilty to one charge of selling food that did not meet the purchaser's expectations regarding quality. Magistrate Leung Nga-yan described the incident as “somewhat exaggerated” and emphasized that the company must ensure that “foreign insects or creatures don’t end up in the food.” Maxim’s was fined HKD 9,000. The prosecution also revealed that the company had 55 previous convictions for similar offenses, though none were related to this specific store.

== See also ==
- Maxim's Caterers
- Hong Kong cuisine
- List of bakeries
