= Food Angel =

Food rescue organization in Hong Kong

- Chinese: 惜食堂
- Formation: 2011 (15 years ago)
- Founder: Bo Charity Foundation
- Headquarters: Hong Kong
- Region served: Kowloon and Hong Kong Island
- Website: www.foodangel.org.hk

Food Angel (Chinese: 惜食堂) is a Hong Kong–based food rescue organization. Food Angel was launched in 2011 (15 years ago) by the Bo Charity Foundation. The organization is supported by local and international food donors, sponsors, and charity partners.

Located in Kowloon and Hong Kong Island, Food Angel has independent offices, kitchens, and a community center. The program rescues approximately 35 tonnes of edible surplus food from the industry, and renders this material into some 10,000 meal boxes and 2,000 food packs which it distributes to the underprivileged.

== Objectives ==
Food Angel has the goals of reducing food waste at source, alleviating hunger, relieving poverty, and educating the next generation. The idea of Food Angel originated from the pressure on landfills in Hong Kong. When the organization started to grow, it began addressing other food-related social problems, such as poverty.

Food Angel works with 150 partners. The goal of the organization is to minimize food waste and to encourage volunteers to give a hand to people in need.

== Services ==
Food Angel rescues surplus food to relieve the landfill pressure in Hong Kong. The organisation collects surplus food from suppliers, supermarket, wet markets, and donation partners. It receives food donations, including fresh food, canned/non-perishable food, oils and seasoning, cooked foods, and frozen/chilled foods, to prepare meal boxes to then distribute to people in need.

Besides distributing meal boxes at the center, Food Angel also visits the elderly and delivers meal boxes to those who are disabled. It also provides elderly care workshops like literacy classes, Chinese opera, and Erhu performances. It receives support from more than 60 companies and organizations.

=== Corporate Angel ===
Corporate Angel supports Food Angel's campaign "Waste Not, Hunger Not". It organizes internal fundraising events to raise money for Food Angel's program.

=== Green Angel ===
Green Angel teaches children to cherish food and preserve the natural resources on Earth. The program offers school-based educational activities over an academic year, including introductory talks, puppet shows, animations, green lessons, food upcycling workshops, field trips, inter-school competitions, and a rewards system.

=== Outreach Angel ===
Outreach Angel delivers free hot meals in boxes and non-perishable food packs, and provides care to singletons and deprived elderly living in the Eastern District. Outreach Angel provides home delivery service and regular home visits to the single, physically frail, or disabled elderly five days a week.

=== Community Angel ===
Community Angel provides free dine-in food assistance service in the Sham Shui Po District for the vulnerable and frail elderly who are aged 65 or above.

== Timeline and news ==
Food Angel was founded in 2011 and has started several campaigns since.

News about Food Angel's activities has been in the media since 2012. For example, there was wide media coverage about the plan to give lunch boxes to the people in need by using food waste, which was introduced in 2015. The three events of Construction Hong Kong appeared in newspapers, such as Apple Daily, Oriental Daily, and Skypost.

	Time	Events
2011	March	The establishment of Food Angel
2012	July	Chai Wan Central Kitchen
2012	August	Food Angel Kitchen Grand Opening
2012	November	1st Canstruction Hong Kong
2013	February	Green Angel - School-Based Education Programme
2013	April	Corporate Angel - Corporate Society Responsibility Program
2013	June	Outreach Angel - Community Outreach Food Assistance Service; Bread Angel - Bread Rescue Volunteering Program
2013	July	Park n Shop 40th Anniversary Food Drive for Food Angel
2013	September	Outreach day with Park n Shop - Shau Kei Wan; Golf 2013 Press Conference
2013	October	Food Angel's Canstruction Rice Bowl by BNY Mellon
2013	December	Sham Shui Po Central Kitchen; MCP X Food Angel - Dine and Give event
2014	February	2nd Canstruction Hong Kong
2014	March	Food Angel Kowloon Kitchen Grand Opening
2014	August	Food Angel x Maxim - Birthday Party
2015	April	3rd Construction Hong Kong
2016	Jan	HKCEC charity lunch
2016	July	ParknShop City Food Drive
2016	Oct	Lai Chi Kwok Food Station
2017	May	ParknShop City Food Drive
2017	Oct	4th Canstruction Hong Kong
2017	Dec	Sham Shui Po Footstep Journey
2018	May	ParknShop City Food Drive
2019	Feb	HKCEC charity lunch
	April	Kwun Tong Harvest Mill
