= Domestic military deployments by the second Trump administration =

2025 political-military campaign

- Part of the second presidency of Donald Trump
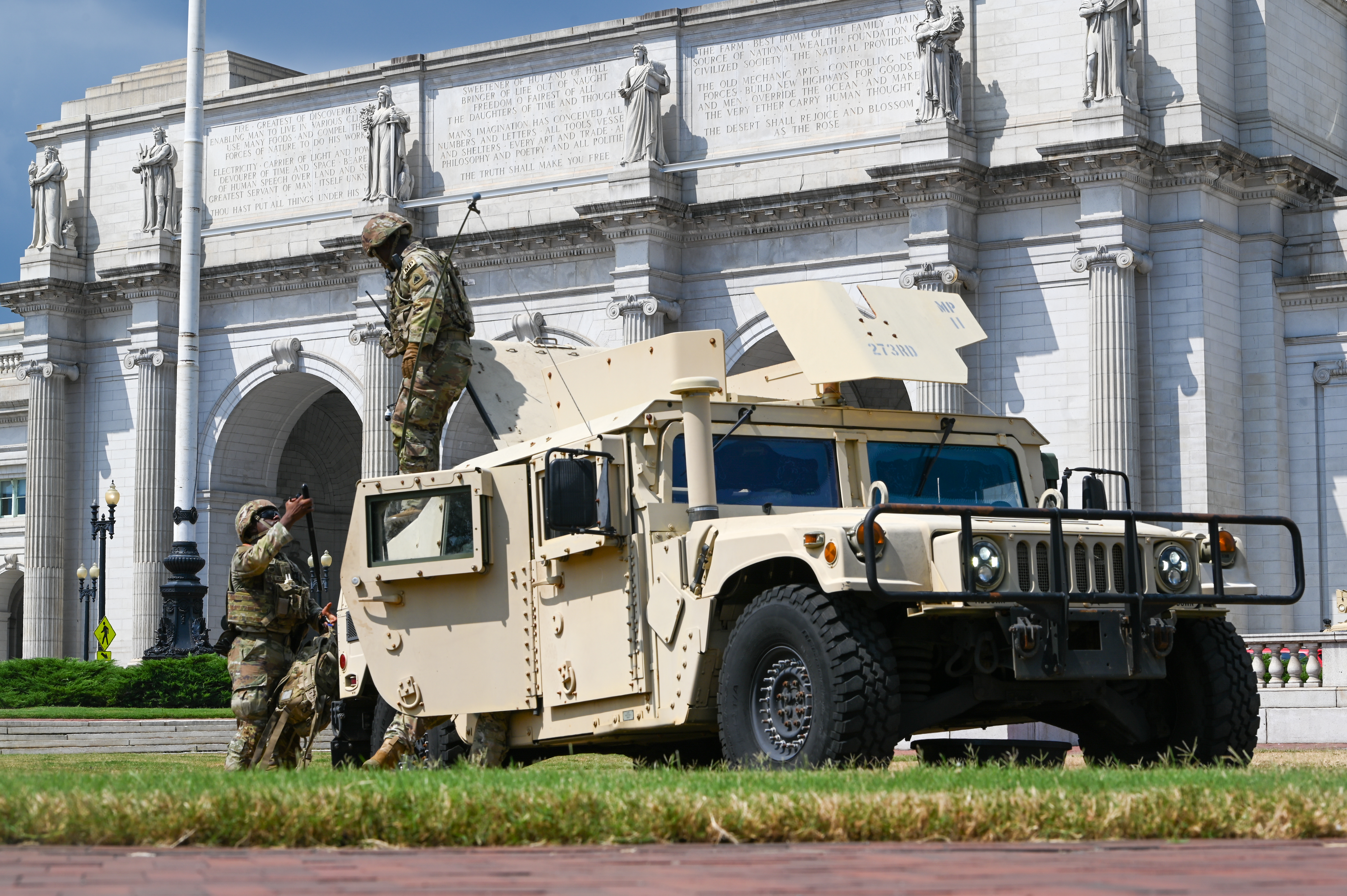
- District of Columbia National Guard members stationed in front of Union Station in Washington D.C.
- Date: June 7, 2025 – present (1 year, 5 months and 6 days)
- Location: Los Angeles, Washington, D.C., Memphis, Tennessee, Minneapolis, Chicago, and New Orleans
- Motive: Crime reduction; Supporting Dept. of Homeland Security and local police forces engaging in deportation operations and civil unrest suppression
- Deaths: 2 (1 civilian, 1 National Guard member)
- Injuries: 1 (National Guard member)

During his second presidency, Donald Trump ordered deployments of National Guard troops to select U.S. cities in 2025 and certain deployments have continued into 2026. Trump has given multiple explanations for the deployments, saying they are officially part of crackdowns on protests, civil unrest, crime, homelessness, and illegal immigration. The actions targeted Democratic Party-led cities and sparked significant controversy, with critics labeling them as abuses of power and potential violations of laws like the Posse Comitatus Act, which limits military involvement in domestic law enforcement. The moves came amidst broader expansions of the military's domestic use during the second Trump administration, and Trump's prior comments during his presidential campaign to use the military to end civil unrest and protests without consent from state governors and target "the enemy within".

Deployments began in Los Angeles in June 2025 and expanded to Washington, D.C., in August 2025, before presidential authorizations were issued to expand to Memphis, Tennessee, and Portland, Oregon, in September 2025. Federal forces arrived in Memphis in October 2025. Plans were underway for Chicago and potentially other cities like New York, Baltimore, San Francisco, and Oakland, California. In September 2025, Trump told military leaders to view the deployments as "training grounds for our military" and described America as under "invasion" and waging "a war from within". In October 2025, Trump authorized federal troop deployments in Chicago as part of Operation Midway Blitz, a multi-agency surge aimed at "criminal illegal aliens" in Illinois and moved on to New Orleans in December.

On September 2, 2025, a federal judge ruled that the administration had illegally sent troops into Los Angeles in violation of the Posse Comitatus Act, a development described as potentially complicating Trump's threats for further military deployment. Further court cases and appeals questioned the legality of the deployments, with the U.S. Supreme Court rejecting an administration emergency appeal of a lower court ruling blocking the National Guard deployment to Chicago. On December 31, Trump announced that the administration would be ending its efforts to deploy the National Guard to Los Angeles, Portland, and Chicago, while suggesting that future National Guard deployments in those cities were still possible. In January 2026, all troops deployed to Chicago, Portland, and Los Angeles were withdrawn, while the National Guard deployment to the District of Columbia was extended to the end of the year.

In the same month, the Congressional Budget Office estimated that the deployments to Los Angeles, Memphis, Portland, Chicago, and the District of Columbia cost $496 million from June through December 2025, and would cost $93 million per month if all five deployments and the deployment in New Orleans were continued in 2026 (which would amount to $1.1 billion in total if continued for the whole year). A minority staff report issued by the Senate Homeland Security Committee in February 2026 estimated that the deployment to the District of Columbia alone from August 2025 through the end of the month would cost $332 million (or $602 million on an annualized basis), which compared with a $599 million budget for the Metropolitan Police Department for fiscal year 2026. As noted by local elected and law enforcement officials, crime statistics from before the National Guard deployments showed falling violent crime and property crime rates in Portland, Los Angeles, Chicago, Memphis, New Orleans, and the District of Columbia.

== Background ==
"I have the right to do anything I want to do. I'm the president of the United States. If I think our country is in danger, and it is in danger in these cities, I can do it."

— Trump's explanation of his power to send the military into American cities during a cabinet meeting on August 26, 2025.

During his 2024 presidential campaign, Trump said he would use the military to end protests without consent from state governors, actions which his aides had talked him out of during his first term. He also stated he would use the military against "the enemy within", which Trump described as "radical left lunatics", Democratic politicians, and those opposed to his candidacy.

Following his election, the Trump administration launched successive purges of top military and intelligence leadership whose views were seen as being at odds with Trump. As early as February 2025, Defense Secretary Pete Hegseth fired multiple military lawyers, saying that "we want lawyers who give sound constitutional advice and don't exist to attempt to be roadblocks to anything". Trump expanded the domestic use of the military, which former military officials and experts on civil–military relations described as an attempt to get Americans used to seeing troops in major American cities and allow Trump to more aggressively quell unrest and dissent. In August, Trump signed an executive order directing the National Guard to create specialized military units to quell civil disturbances in American states to be deployed at his command.

In September 2025, Pentagon leadership unveiled a draft of the National Defense Strategy, which in a dramatic shift from prior plans, prioritized domestic and regional missions rather than combating Russia and China. During a September 30 meeting with over 800 generals and admirals, Trump stated that the deployments should be used as "training grounds for our military" and described America as waging "a war from within"; saying that "America is under invasion from within" and that it was "No different than a foreign enemy, but more difficult in many ways because they don’t wear uniforms."

== Deployments ==
=== Los Angeles ===
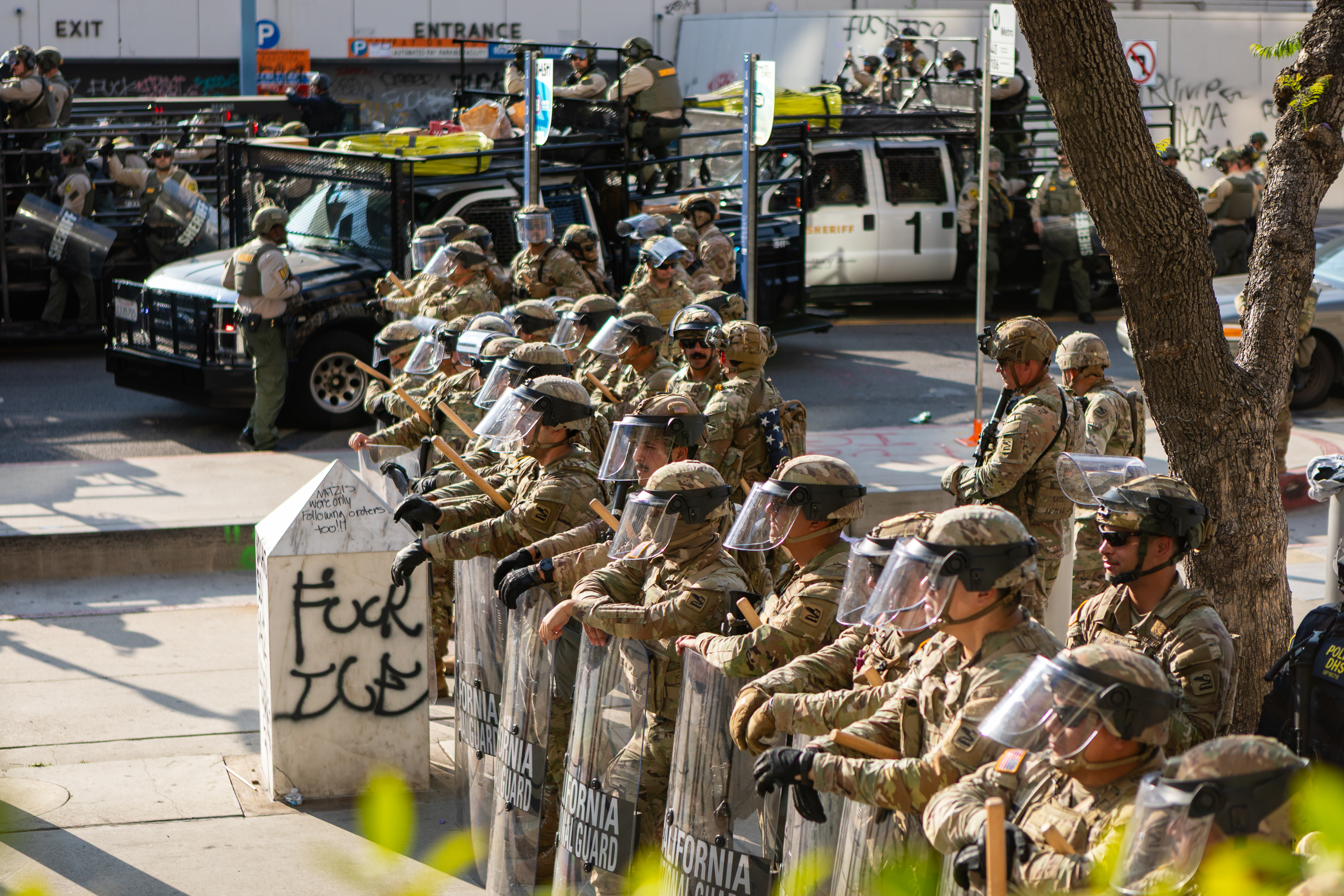
California National Guard soldiers deployed in Los Angeles on June 12, 2025

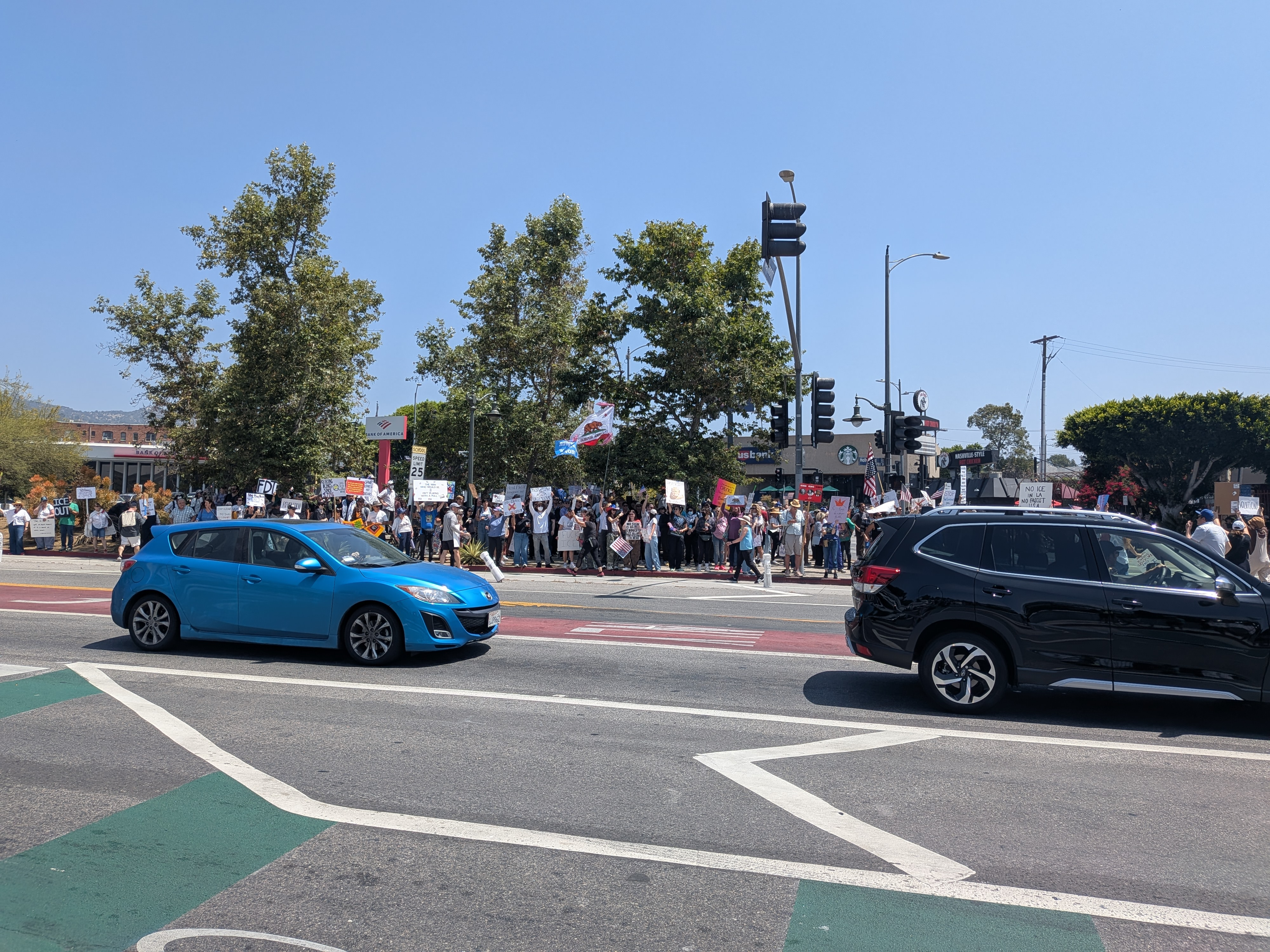
Hollywood and Vermont protest

In June 2025, Trump ordered 700 Marines and 4,000 National Guard troops to Los Angeles amid protests against immigration raids, overriding California governor Gavin Newsom's objections. On September 2, U.S. district judge Charles Breyer ruled that the Trump administration had violated the Posse Comitatus Act in its deployment of military forces, and that the rationale for deployment was contrived, writing that there "was no rebellion, nor was civilian law enforcement unable to respond to the protests and enforce the law".

The New York Times described the federalization and deployment of the California National Guard as Trump "pushing the boundaries of presidential authority and stoking criticism that he is inflaming the situation for political gain" by portraying the events as an "existential threat to the country," and embracing the rhetoric of a nation under siege with Trump saying he needed to "liberate Los Angeles" from a "migrant invasion." Communications experts described the language as militaristic, hyperbolic, inflammatory, and designed to discourage dissent.

The Economist described the response as only barely concerned with restoring order, and stated its purpose was to "create confrontation" and fuel a "cycle of protest, violence and repression" to the administration's benefit. Politico described Trump's response as motivated by attempting to avoid a repeat of the George Floyd protests when he was advised against deploying the military, as acting in his belief of a governing mandate by voters that fueled his 2024 election victory, and serving as a warning to other city and state leaders. Internal military communications expressed concerns of "far-reaching social, political and operational" impacts of the deployment, and that use of military forces posed "extremely high" risk to civilians, troops, and the military's reputation.

On December 15, National Guard troops left the city following a court order for the deployment to end.

=== Washington, D.C. ===
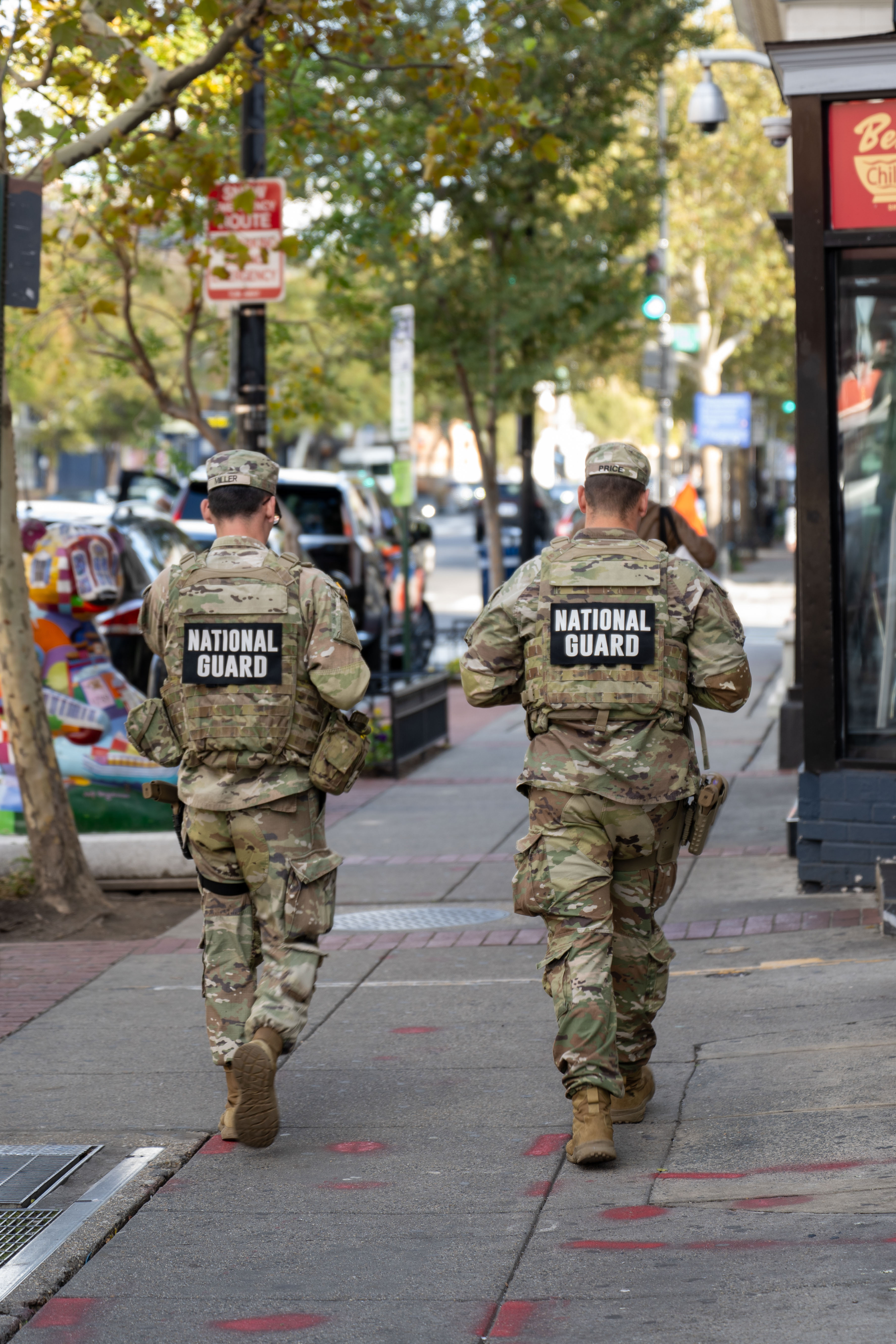
West Virginia guardsmen patrolling U Street station in Washington, D.C., October 20, 2025

Approximately 2,000 National Guard troops, including about 800 from the District of Columbia National Guard, were deployed in August 2025 under a presidential memorandum and Executive Order 14339. Under Executive Order 14333, the administration federalized the D.C. Metropolitan Police Department (MPDC) for 30 days and armed the troops for patrols in tourist areas rather than high-crime zones. Trump claimed this had brought "total safety" and a "miracle" reduction in crime, citing a week without murders. Before the military intervention, crime statistics showed D.C. being in a 30-year low in crime, although there was a small spike in lethality in 2023 that since came down. However, a Washington, D.C., police commissioner was placed on leave for allegedly falsifying crime data in mid-May, and the city police union has claimed that underreporting of crime is a systemic problem. Over 700 arrests and 91 illegal firearms seizures were reported by August 24. A CNN poll conducted showed that nearly 80% of D.C. residents opposed the deployment. Troops were mobilized from Republican-led states which had 10 cities with higher crime rates than D.C.

The federalization of the MPDC ended on September 10, but the National Guard deployment was initially extended to November 30 and subsequently to February 2026. On November 26, a shooting took place outside of Farragut West station, leaving one soldier from the West Virginia National Guard dead and another injured. In response, Trump ordered the deployment of 500 additional National Guard troops.

=== Memphis ===
ICE officers carrying out a raid during the Memphis Safe Task Force, October 2026

On September 12, 2025, Trump announced the deployment of National Guardsmen to Memphis, Tennessee, saying that "Memphis is deeply troubled" and that he would have preferred deploying the troops to Chicago. He did not specify when the troops would be deployed to the city. In 2025, FBI statistics indicated that Memphis was among the cities with the highest rates of violent crime. Compared to previous years, Memphis' crime was at a 25-year low according to the Memphis Police Department. Trump did not indicate under what authority the troops would be deployed in Memphis.

On September 15, 2025, Trump signed a presidential memorandum directing the Secretary of Defense to request that the Governor of Tennessee deploy the Tennessee National Guard to Memphis and coordinate with other state governors to mobilize other state National Guards for deployment to Memphis, and ordering the deployment of federal law enforcement as part of a task force to coordinate operations with the National Guard. Members of the Memphis municipal government, including Memphis mayor Paul Young and Memphis city council members, spoke against the planned deployment. The Shelby County Board of Commissioners voted on a pair of resolutions to either support a ninety-day deployment or call on Tennessee Governor Bill Lee to oppose the deployment. Both resolutions were rejected by the Shelby County Board of Commissioners. Shelby County mayor Lee Harris was less willing to compromise than Young in his opposition to the planned deployment of federal forces to Memphis.

On October 1, 2025, an increased presence of federal law enforcement was visible in Memphis. The same day, Homeland Security Advisor Stephen Miller told officers of the Memphis Safe Task Force that they were "unleashed". The task force incorporated at least 219 federally deputized officers at the beginning of October. Governor Lee indicated that he believed that any deployment of National Guard troops would include no more than 150 unarmed personnel who would not make arrests unless requested to do so by local authorities.

As of July 2026, at least four people have been shot and killed by federal authorities as part of the Safe Task Force operations.

=== Chicago ===
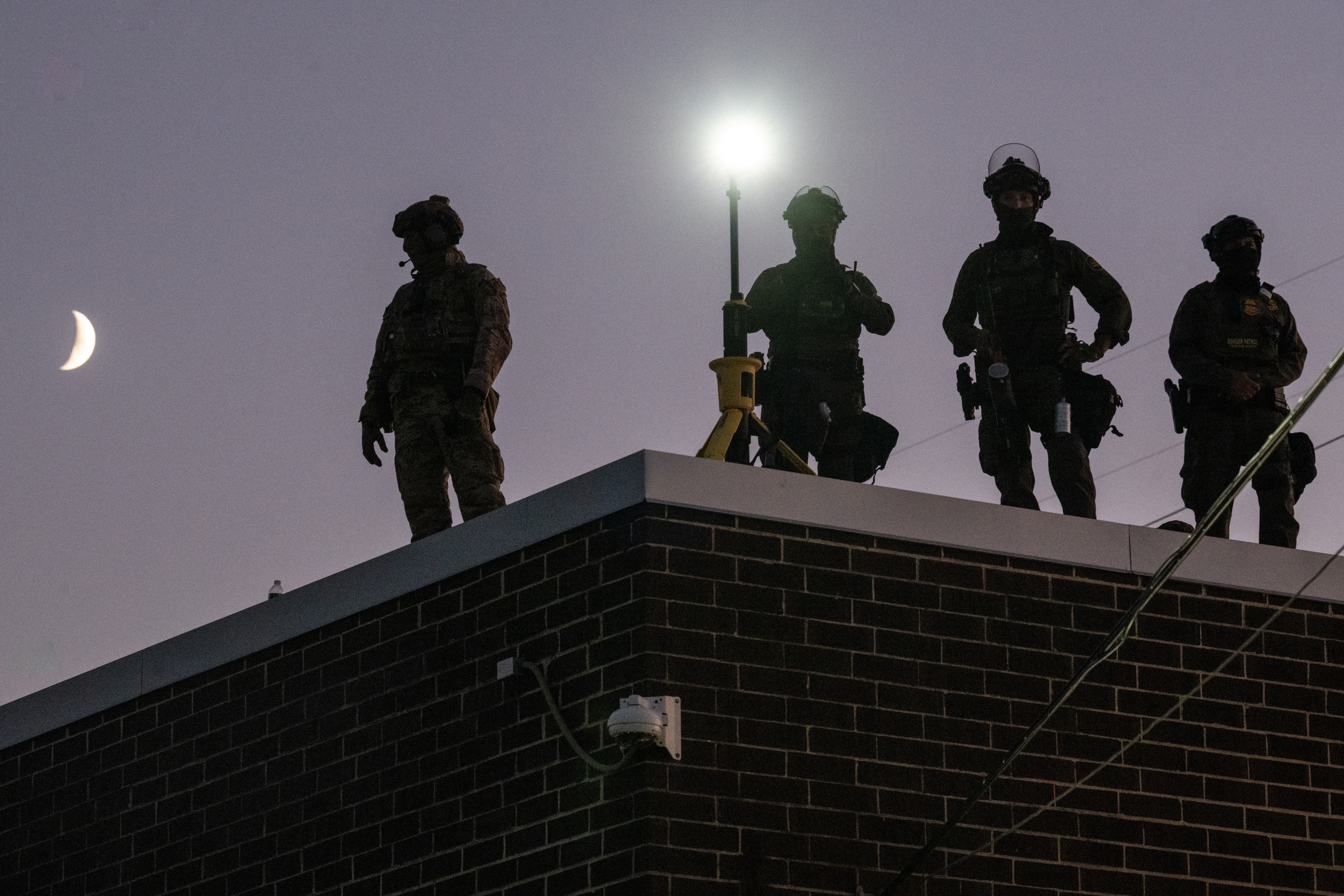
ICE agents on top of the Broadview ICE Detention Center on September 9, 2025

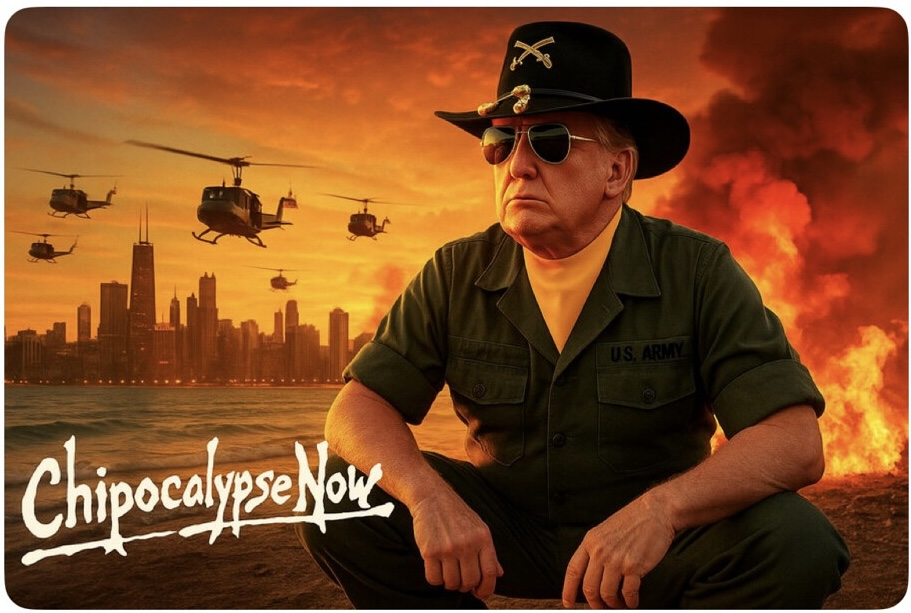
AI-generated image published on X by The White House on September 6, 2025

The Pentagon was planning a military deployment in Chicago, Illinois, for weeks ahead of August 2025, with reports at the time stating that thousands of National Guard troops could be mobilized by September 2025. However, by October 11, no such deployment had occurred. Trump has repeatedly singled out Chicago as "next," calling it a "mess" and claiming residents are "screaming" for federal intervention. No formal request has been made to Illinois officials, and crime data shows significant declines (homicides down 30%, shootings down 40% in the past year).

On September 6, Trump threatened "Apocalypse Now"-style action against Chicago, writing "I love the smell of deportations in the morning" amid an AI-generated picture of himself as Lt. Col. Bill Kilgore in front of a burning Chicago skyline with helicopters and that "Chicago [is] about to find out why it's called the Department of WAR". The post was criticized by local elected leaders, with Governor of Illinois JB Pritzker writing, "The President of the United States is threatening to go to war with an American city. This is not a joke. This is not normal." Trump's threat came amidst large citywide celebrations and parades.

On September 28, Customs and Border Protection and Immigration and Customs Enforcement agents with automatic weapons and full combat gear patrolled high-visibility tourist areas in downtown Chicago. An investigation was launched by Broadview police into an "unprovoked attack" by ICE who allegedly shot a chemical munition at a WBBM-TV Chicago news van.

In early October, Trump officially authorized the National Guard to be deployed to Chicago. On November 15, a Department of Defense official stated that hundreds of National Guard troops that were dispatched to Chicago and Portland, Oregon, but not deployed due to legal challenges would be returning to Texas and California.

=== New Orleans ===
On December 2, 2025, Trump announced plans to send the National Guard to New Orleans. The previous September, Louisiana Governor Jeff Landry requested 1,000 troops in September citing elevated levels of crime in New Orleans, Shreveport, and Baton Rouge. Landry said the troops would likely arrive before Christmas and would not be deployed only to New Orleans. The announcement came a day before a separate deployment of 250 Border Patrol agents by the Department of Homeland Security (called the "Swamp Sweep") began.

Outgoing New Orleans Mayor LaToya Cantrell said before Trump's announcement that she was open to working with the administration to improve public safety in the city, while the assistant superintendent of the New Orleans Police Department (NOPD) said in September that crime rates in the city were falling. Incoming Mayor Helena Moreno opposes the National Guard deployment and has expressed concerns about potential due process violations with the Border Patrol deployment, but stated that NOPD policy is that immigration law is outside of its jurisdiction to enforce. Baton Rouge Mayor Sid Edwards expressed support for the National Guard deployment to his city after Trump's announcement due to a police shortage, while the Baton Rouge City Council issued a press release in September expressing opposition to Landry's request. In October, Shreveport Mayor Tom Arceneaux said that while crime was already falling in his city and that he would prefer greater deployments of Louisiana State Police officers, he was willing to receive the National Guard deployment.

On December 23, Trump approved the deployment of an additional 350 National Guard troops to New Orleans. On December 29, NOPD officials announced that the National Guard would be patrolling New Orleans during the upcoming New Year's celebrations, but would not be assisting with immigration law enforcement, would be confined to the French Quarter, and would be conducting operations similar to those after the 2025 New Orleans truck attack. 350 Louisiana National Guard troops arrived in New Orleans on December 30.

== Potential deployments ==
=== Portland ===
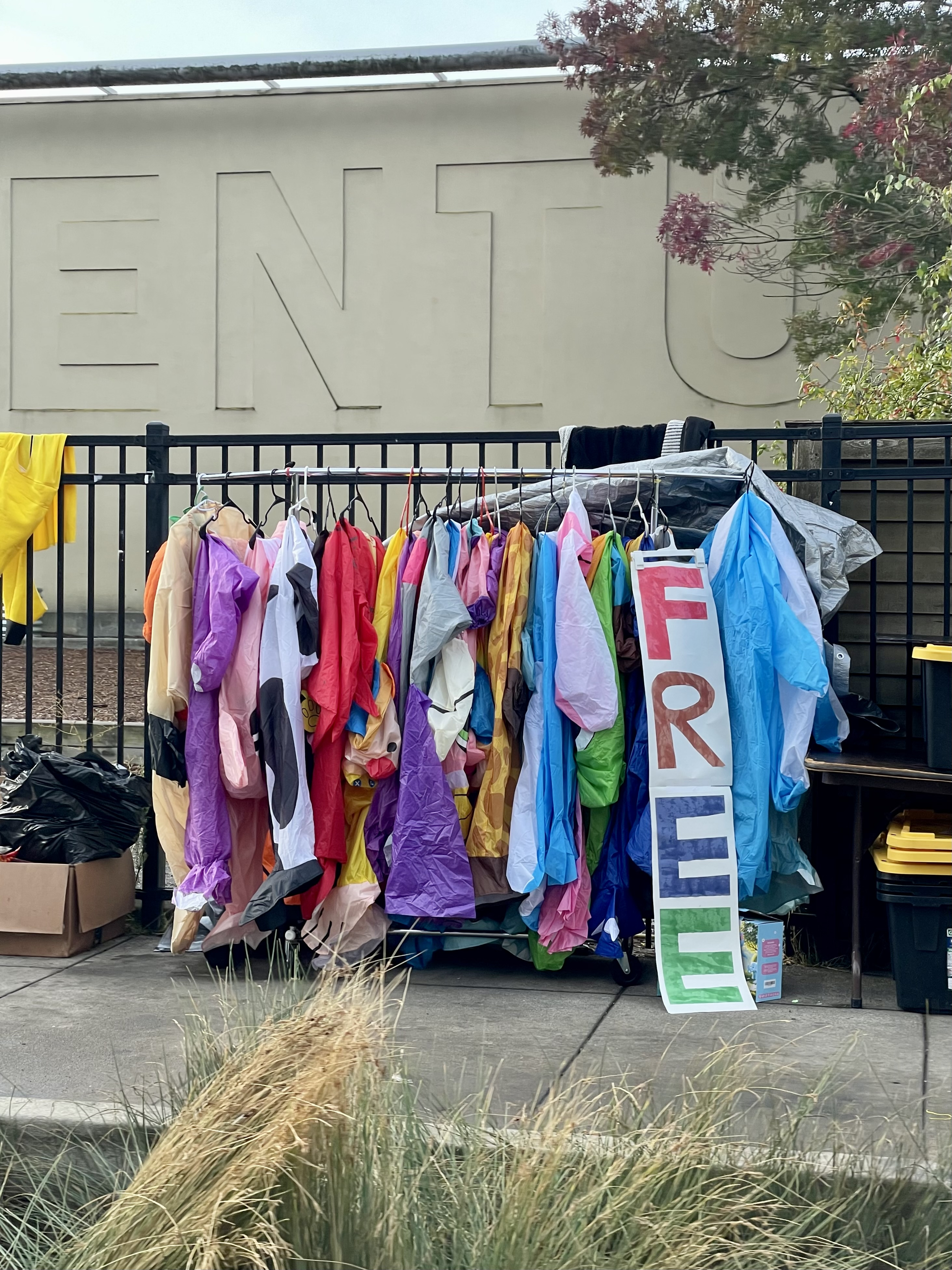
Inflatable costumes made available by Operation Inflation

On September 27, Trump announced on Truth Social that he had ordered the U.S. Department of Defense to deploy troops to Portland to counter what he called "domestic terrorists" in "war-ravaged Portland". Trump stated that he was authorizing the use of "full force," if necessary, in order to protect Portland-based ICE facilities. On September 28, it was revealed that Oregon state leaders received a memo from Trump where he noted that he had ordered the deployment of 200 National Guard members to Portland, and that they were authorized to "perform federal functions for 60 days."

Ongoing riots occurred around an ICE facility in the city for several months with few incidents. The movement peaked in June 2025, and by September, the Portland Police Bureau estimated that activity was limited to 100s demonstrators per night, and booths placed by religious organizations during the daytime hours to provide spiritual support to those attending appointments at the facility.

Portland mayor Keith Wilson suspected that Trump's decision to send troops to Portland was based on his viewing of file footage of past unrest in the city; on September 26, Fox News aired interviews with Newt Gingrich and DHS assistant secretary Tricia McLaughlin to discuss Trump's recent declaration of "Antifa" as a domestic terrorist group, both of which containing B-roll of unrest during Portland's George Floyd protests in 2020. In a phone interview with NBC News correspondent Yamiche Alcindor on September 28, Trump seemingly questioned his decision to deploy troops, stating "I spoke to the governor [Tina Kotek], she was very nice. But I said, 'Well wait a minute, am I watching things on television that are different from what's happening? My people tell me different.' They are literally attacking and there are fires all over the place ... it looks like terrible." Residents on social media called out the claims that Portland was "war-ravaged", with some posting photos of everyday scenes of the city to disprove and comment upon it. Protesters responded with tactical frivolity, wearing inflatable animal costumes and dancing to "deflate" the narrative of a war zone of violent antifa protesters.

As of October 23, 2025, 200 federalized Oregon National Guard troops were on standby near Portland, though they had not been deployed to the city. On January 15, 2026, about 100 National Guard members returned from Portland to Fort Bliss in El Paso, Texas.

=== Minneapolis ===
On January 15, 2026, Trump threatened to invoke the Insurrection Act of 1807 in response to the Renée Good protests in Minneapolis against ICE operations in the city, which Minnesota Attorney General Keith Ellison has said he will challenge in court if Trump does so. Legal scholars dispute that the conditions that permit invocation of the Insurrection Act have occurred in Minneapolis based on historical precedent despite the law's facially broad language. Trump backtracked from the threat the next day, saying there was not a "reason right now" to do so but reiterated that "It's been used a lot, and if I needed it, I'd use it".

On January 18, the United States Department of Defense reportedly ordered 1,500 active-duty soldiers to prepare for a possible deployment to Minnesota, including two battalions from the 11th Airborne Division of the United States Army based in Alaska. In an emailed press statement, department spokesperson Sean Parnell stated: "The Department of War is always prepared to execute the orders of the Commander-in-Chief if called upon", but unnamed Trump administration sources have said that the standby order does not guarantee a deployment will occur or is imminent. An unnamed Defense Department source has confirmed that the standby order was issued in response to Trump's threats to invoke the Insurrection Act. On January 20, the Defense Department reportedly issued a second standby order to a brigade of the Military Police Corps stationed at Fort Bragg in North Carolina to prepare for potential deployment to Minneapolis.

On February 3, ABC News reported that the United States Northern Command had issued a stand down order the previous weekend to the service members that had been mobilized by the standby orders.

=== Other cities ===
President Trump has mentioned expanding to other cities, including New York City; Baltimore, Maryland; and Oakland, California. Up to 1,700 National Guard troops are mobilizing across 19 states (e.g., Texas with the most) to support ICE on immigration enforcement, though the White House claims this is separate from the crime crackdown. These could serve as a "reaction force" for rapid deployments.

State and local leaders in several cities, including Boston, Detroit, New Haven, and Seattle, have rejected the possibility of the National Guard being sent to their cities.

== Response ==
=== Political leaders ===
Local leaders denounced the moves. Chicago mayor Brandon Johnson warned it could "inflame tensions between residents and law enforcement". Pritzker calls it an "authoritarian power grab" with no emergency justification. House Minority Leader Hakeem Jeffries accuses Trump of manufacturing a crisis. D.C. mayor Muriel Bowser and others highlight pre-existing crime drops and argue troops lack proper training for policing.

Six Democratic lawmakers urged members of the U.S. military to disobey illegal orders in a video posted on social media. Later, they said that the FBI had opened an investigation into them. Senator Elissa Slotkin of Michigan, one of the six, called the move a "scare tactic" by Trump.

On December 11, the Senate Armed Services Committee held a hearing where USNORTHCOM Commander Gregory Guillot and Defense Department officials were questioned about the National Guard deployments and service members being given orders that violate the enlistment oath.

=== Legal challenges ===
Some legal commentators have suggested that the deployments in the District of Columbia leverage unique federal control over the capital, but expansions elsewhere may require invoking the Insurrection Act or declaring emergencies to federalize state National Guards, potentially bypassing governors. Critics argue these are politically motivated, targeting Democratic cities for "theater and intimidation."

==== California ====
On June 9, 2025, California Attorney General Rob Bonta filed a lawsuit against the Trump administration to block the California National Guard deployment with an emergency restraining order, which was denied by Northern California U.S. District Court Judge Charles Breyer the next day. On June 12, Breyer ruled that the federalization of the California National Guard violated the Tenth Amendment and the deployment was not authorized in accordance with Title 10 of the United States Code, but Breyer's ruling was appealed by the Trump administration and was stayed on the same day by the United States Court of Appeals for the Ninth Circuit. The Ninth Circuit extended the stay on June 19, and denied rehearing of the stay on October 22.

On September 2, Breyer ruled that the Trump administration had violated the Posse Comitatus Act and ordered the administration not to use National Guard or military troops for civilian law enforcement in California with that prohibition to take effect on September 12. Breyer described the administration's actions and rhetoric of further domestic military deployments as an apparent attempt at "creating a national police force with the President as its chief" and described the rationale for deployment as contrived, writing that "There was no rebellion, nor was civilian law enforcement unable to respond to the protests and enforce the law". He said the Trump administration, if it wished to argue, would have to "satisfy the requirements of a valid constitutional or statutory exception, as defined herein, to the Posse Comitatus Act." On September 4, the Ninth Circuit stayed the decision after the administration appealed.

On December 10, Breyer ordered the Trump administration to end the deployment of the California National Guard to Los Angeles and return control of its units to the state government, but stayed his ruling for 5 days to allow for an appeal. On December 12, the Ninth Circuit upheld Breyer's December 10 ruling for the federalized troops to leave the city by noon on December 15 while allowing the federalization to continue.

==== District of Columbia ====
On September 4, 2025, the Attorney General for the District of Columbia filed a lawsuit against the administration to block the National Guard deployment in the District. On November 20, a District of Columbia U.S. District Court Judge Jia Cobb ruled that the deployment was not lawful and ordered the administration to end the deployment, but stayed the decision for 21 days to allow for an appeal. The Trump administration filed an appeal on November 26. On December 4, the United States Court of Appeals for the District of Columbia Circuit issued an administrative stay of the D.C. District Court ruling. On December 17, a panel of D.C. Circuit judges issued a further stay of the lower court ruling.

==== Illinois ====
On October 4, 2025, the state of Illinois and city of Chicago filed a lawsuit against the Trump administration against the deployment of the National Guard, stating it was unlawful and asking for it to be halted. On October 9, District Judge April Perry blocked the federalization and deployment in Illinois through October 23. On October 11, the U.S. Court of Appeals for the 7th Circuit temporarily stayed the district court ruling "to the extent it enjoined the federalization of the National Guard of the United States within Illinois" but upheld the lower order denying the deployment of the National Guard. On October 16, the 7th Circuit issued a ruling upholding the federalization of the National Guard but blocking the deployment after finding the administration's claims of rebellion and lawlessness were exaggerated, stating that "we emphasize that the critical analysis of a 'rebellion' centers on the nature of the resistance to governmental authority", and that lacking violence, "Political opposition is not rebellion." On October 17, the Trump administration petitioned the Supreme Court seeking to overturn the ruling. On December 23, the Supreme Court rejected the administration's request for an emergency stay.

==== Oregon ====
On October 4, 2025, U.S. district judge Karin Immergut—who was appointed by Trump in 2019—granted a motion for a temporary restraining order on the deployment in Portland pending further hearings, ruling that the protest activity did not constitute a "rebellion" under the Posse Comitatus Act, and that Trump had exceeded his statutory authority under Title 10 of the United States Code. Immergut wrote that Trump's narrative of Portland as a "war-ravaged" city was "untethered to facts", the incidents which did occur were "nowhere near the type of incidents that cannot be handled by regular law enforcement forces", and that "this country has a longstanding and foundational tradition of resistance to government overreach, especially in the form of military intrusion into civil affairs. This historical tradition boils down to a simple proposition: this is a nation of Constitutional law, not martial law."

The next day, amid reports that the administration was preparing to deploy the California and Texas National Guard in an attempt to sidestep the restraining order, California governor Gavin Newsom joined Kotek in the suit and jointly requested emergency relief. Judge Immergut issued an emergency ruling and second restraining order, prohibiting any National Guard deployments to Portland regardless of origin. On October 15, Immergut issued a procedural ruling to extend the restraining orders by 14 additional days.

On October 20, the Ninth Circuit Court of Appeals overturned the first restraining order in a 2-1 decision. Judges Ryan D. Nelson and Bridget S. Bade wrote that "even if the President may exaggerate the extent of the problem on social media, this does not change that other facts provide a colorable basis to support the statutory requirement." This ruling only affects the first restraining order; the second restraining order issued on October 5 was not part of the challenge and remains in effect, and a spokesperson for United States Northern Command told Oregon Public Broadcasting that federalized troops "are not conducting any operational activities at this time". On October 28, the Ninth Circuit vacated the ruling and approved a request for an en banc review. The en banc order included a 64-page statement by Judge Jay Bybee urging the court to account for the Constitution's Domestic Violence Clause. The order also includes a response by Judge Eric Tung, who was confirmed on November 7, 2025.

==== Tennessee ====
On November 17, 2025, a Tennessee Chancery Court judge for Davidson County issued a ruling blocking the deployment of the Tennessee National Guard by Governor Bill Lee to Memphis. However, the judge stayed the ruling to allow the state government to appeal, which Lee's office and the Tennessee Attorney General's office stated they would the day after the ruling. The appeal was filed on November 21.

== See also ==
- 2020 deployment of federal forces in the United States
- Civil–military relations
- Democratic backsliding in the United States
- Martial law (United States)
- Militarization of police
- Military aid to the civil power (United States)
- Military dictatorship
- Military operations other than war (United States)
- Military response to protest
- Police power (United States constitutional law)
- Police state
- Separation of military and police roles
