= Martial law in the United States =

Martial law in the United States refers to times in United States history in which a region, state, city, or the whole United States was placed under the control of a military body. On a national level, both the US President and the US Congress have the power, within certain constraints, to impose martial law since both can be in charge of the military. In nearly every state, the governor has the power to impose martial law within the borders of the state. In the United States, martial law has been used in a limited number of circumstances, such as New Orleans during the Battle of New Orleans; after major disasters, such as the Great Chicago Fire of 1871, the 1906 San Francisco earthquake, the Great Flood of 1913, or during riots, such as the Omaha race riot of 1919 or the 1920 Lexington riots; local leaders declared martial law to protect themselves from mob violence, such as Nauvoo, Illinois, during the Illinois Mormon War, or Utah during the Utah War; or in response to chaos associated with protests and rioting, such as the 1934 West Coast waterfront strike, in Hawaii after Japan's attack on Pearl Harbor, and during the Civil Rights Movement in response to the Cambridge riot of 1963.

== Legal basis ==
The martial law concept in the United States is closely tied to the right of habeas corpus, which is, in essence, the right to a hearing and trial on lawful imprisonment, or more broadly, the supervision of law enforcement by the judiciary. The ability to suspend habeas corpus is related to the imposition of martial law. Article 1, Section 9 of the US Constitution states, "The Privilege of the Writ of Habeas Corpus shall not be suspended, unless when in Cases of Rebellion or Invasion the public Safety may require it." There have been many instances of the use of the military within the borders of the United States, such as during the Whiskey Rebellion, President Lincoln's suspension of habeas corpus in 1861 in order to arrest of one-third of the Maryland state assembly, and in the South during the Civil Rights Movement, but those acts are not tantamount to a declaration of martial law.

In United States law, martial law is limited by several court decisions that were handed down between the American Civil War and World War II. In 1878, Congress passed the Posse Comitatus Act, which forbids US military involvement in domestic law enforcement without congressional approval.

Throughout history, martial law has been imposed at least 68 times in limited, usually local areas of the United States. Martial law was declared for these reasons: Twice for war or invasion, seven times for domestic war or insurrection, eleven times for riot or civil unrest, 29 times for labor dispute, four times for natural disaster and fifteen times for other reasons. Habeas corpus was suspended federally only once; in 1863, during the Civil War.

== History ==
=== American Revolution ===
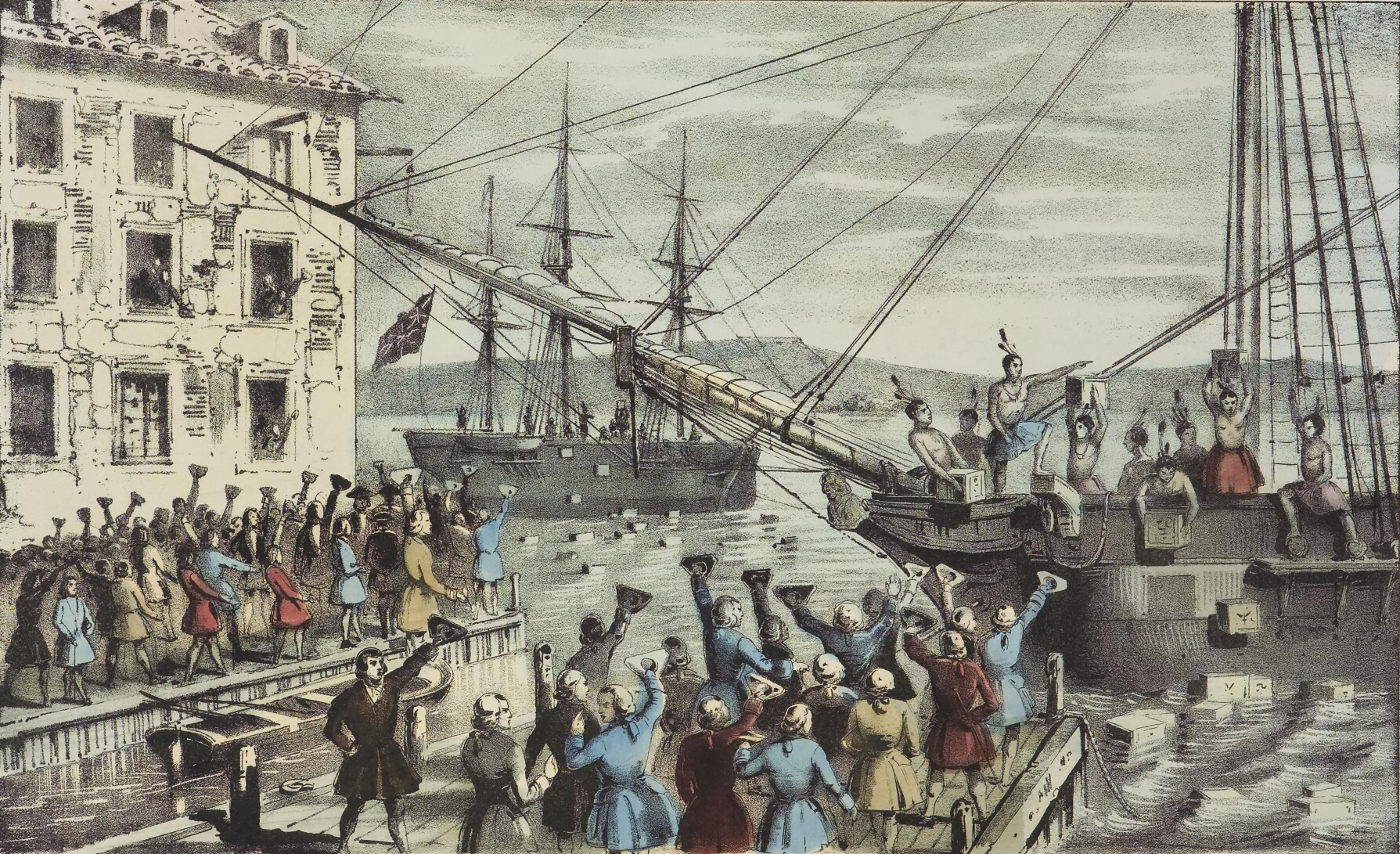
The Boston Tea Party prompted Great Britain to pass the Massachusetts Government Act.

During the American Revolutionary period, British authorities imposed martial law in several instances to suppress colonial resistance and maintain control. Notable examples include:

- Boston (1774) — In response to the Boston Tea Party, the British Parliament passed the Intolerable Acts, one of which — the Massachusetts Government Act — effectively placed Boston under martial law by closing its port and restricting town meetings. General Thomas Gage, appointed as the military governor, enforced these measures to quell dissent.
- Virginia (1775) — On November 7, 1775, Lord Dunmore, the royal governor of Virginia, issued a proclamation declaring martial law and offering freedom to indentured servants and enslaved individuals who joined British forces against the rebelling colonists. This move aimed to weaken the colonial rebellion by disrupting the labor force and encouraging enslaved people to support the British cause.
- New York (1776) — Following the British capture of New York City in September 1776, martial law was imposed to restore order and assert British authority. Governor William Tryon, though retaining his title, had limited power as military commanders took control of the city’s administration.

=== New Orleans in War of 1812 ===
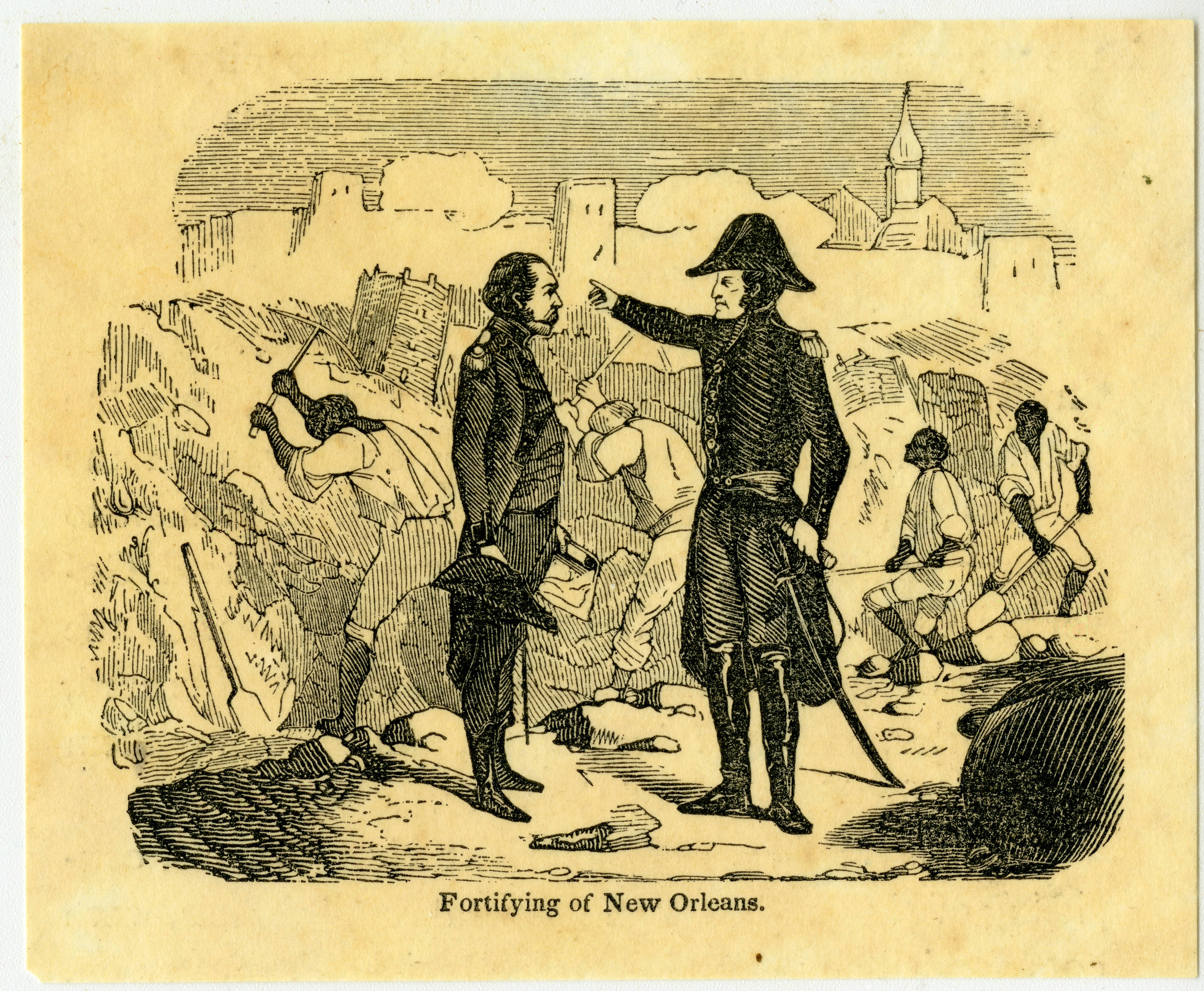
Andrew Jackson imposed martial law in New Orleans during the War of 1812.

During the War of 1812, General Andrew Jackson imposed martial law in New Orleans. Upon arriving in the city on December 1, 1814, Jackson encountered a diverse and divided populace, including Anglo-Americans, Creoles, freedmen, and slaves. Concerns about potential disloyalty and panic among residents led him to declare martial law on December 16. Jackson imposed several measures:

- Strict curfews and travel restrictions were imposed on all residents. Jackson declared that anyone challenging his authority would be considered a spy or traitor, leading to mass arrests and overcrowded jails. These rules remained in effect for several months after hostilities had ended. When district and federal judges ruled against his actions, Jackson imprisoned them as well.
- Jackson warned newspapers not to publish information about the Treaty of Ghent unless he approved the content. He arrested a prominent legislator and banished several officials for criticizing his heavy-handed enforcement of martial law. Jackson later defended these actions, claiming that unrestricted press freedom could endanger military operations by conveying intelligence to the enemy or inciting unrest.
- Individuals expressing opposition to martial law, including Louisiana State Senator Louis Louaillier and U.S. District Court Judge Dominic A. Hall, were arrested. Louaillier criticized Jackson’s policies in a newspaper article, leading to his arrest on Jackson’s orders. Judge Hall issued a writ of habeas corpus for Louaillier’s release, prompting Jackson to arrest Hall as well.

=== Dorr Rebellion (1842–1843) ===
By 1842, Rhode Island was the only one of the original thirteen states which continued to operate under its colonial charter instead of a state constitution. This charter restricted legal and legislative rights to "freemen" who were white males who owned real estate and who formally requested membership in the corporation. Non-freemen who resided in the state constituted a second-class of citizenship who were barred from participation in the court system unless they were sponsored by a freeman. After multiple failed attempts to expand suffrage rights and update the charter, a group of non-freemen, under the leadership of Thomas Wilson Dorr assembled in a people's convention to write their own constitution. Subsequent elections resulted in there being two rival governments in the state, one under the freemen's charter, the other under the Dorrite constitution. The charter government passed legislation which criminalized participation in the Dorrite organization. Militiamen sympathetic to the Dorrites in response led an assault on the State Arsenal in an attempt to seize weapons. Governor Samuel Ward King sought help from President John Tyler to suppress the rebellion and placed the state under martial law. Tyler sent in additional troops to the local fort, but maintained that this was a state issue.

Martial law existed until a subsequent convention adopted a new constitution which incorporated many of the Dorrites' demands. Dorr was arrested for treason against the state, but was later released under a general amnesty law. This was the first instance of martial law upheld by the United States Supreme Court in the case Luther v. Borden (1849), which held that the maintenance of a republican form of government and the control of domestic violence were inherently political questions outside of the court's jurisdiction.

=== Nauvoo, Illinois, during the Illinois Mormon War (1843) ===
In 1843, Missouri sought to extradite Joseph Smith, the founder of Mormonism, for allegedly attempting to murder Missouri governor Lilburn Boggs. He escaped arrest with the help of members of his church, and was discharged on a writ of habeas corpus in the Municipal Court of Nauvoo, where he was mayor, even though it was outside the court's jurisdiction. People in the neighboring town of Carthage, Illinois, felt that Smith was abusing his position in order to avoid arrest. They requested that Governor Ford call out the militia to take Smith into custody, which Governor Ford declined to do. A group of ex-Mormons published a paper called the Nauvoo Expositor which detailed Smith's alleged abuse of power. Together with the Nauvoo City Council, Smith ordered the destruction of the Nauvoo Expositor. This caused an uproar in neighboring towns, which interpreted the order as an attack on the freedom of speech. Smith was charged with causing a riot, which the Nauvoo courts dismissed. Neighboring cities raised money for a militia to go and capture Smith. Governor Ford arrived in Carthage and sent word to Smith that if he did not surrender, Ford would call out the militia. On June 18, Smith declared martial law in Nauvoo and called out the Nauvoo Legion, an organized city militia of about 5,000 men, to protect Nauvoo from outside violence. Ford sent a group of men and abolished martial law. By this time, Smith had escaped into Iowa but was convinced by his supporters to return. He was arrested for treason against the state of Illinois for declaring martial law. While awaiting trial in Carthage Jail, Smith was murdered by a mob. In 1845, Nauvoo was stripped of its charter for abuse of authority. This led to a series of conflicts known as the Illinois Mormon War.

=== Utah War (1857) ===
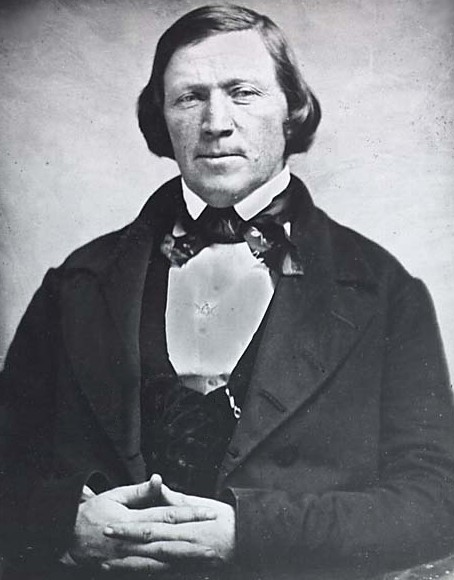
Governor Brigham Young declared martial law on September 15, 1857 in Utah shortly before being removed as governor.

Tension between Utah Territory and the federal government was strained in 1858 due to the influence of theodemocracy in Governor Brigham Young's semi-theocratic government, Utah's rejection of federal appointees, and Utah's acceptance of polygamy. In 1857, President James Buchanan sent U.S. forces to the Utah Territory in what became known as the Utah War. The Mormons, fearing that the large U.S. military force had been sent to annihilate them, made preparations for defense. On 15 September, Young publicly declared martial law in Utah. It was widely circulated throughout the territory and was delivered by messenger to Col. Alexander with the approaching army. The most important provision forbade "all armed forces of every description from coming into this Territory, under any pretense whatsoever". It also commanded that "all the forces in said Territory hold themselves in readiness to march at a moment's notice to repel any and all such invasion". But more important to California- and Oregon-bound travelers was the third section that stated, "Martial law is hereby declared to exist in this Territory...and no person shall be allowed to pass or repass into, through or from this territory without a permit from the proper officer." Brigham Young ordered the people in Salt Lake City, Utah, to burn their homes and retreat south to Provo, Utah. Meanwhile, the Mormons harassed the approaching army. Eventually, Brigham Young was removed as governor and replaced by Alfred Cumming.

=== American Civil War (1861–1865) ===
- Baltimore (1861) — In April 1861, secessionists severed railroad links around Baltimore to prevent the passage of federal troops and materiel southward. Union general Benjamin Butler entered the city the following month and took over administration from civilian authorities, despite having no federal authority to do so.
- St. Louis (1861) — Several days after the Battle of Fort Sumter Missouri Governor Claiborne Jackson, who while elected on a pro-Union platform secretly supported secession, initiated a plan to seize the St. Louis Arsenal and align the state with the Confederacy. The plot used the Camp Jackson militia camp as a staging ground. Captain Nathaniel Lyon, acting commander of the Department of the West, uncovered the plot and forced the militia to surrender. While marching the prisoners to the Arsenal to be paroled, a secessionist mob confronted the soldiers and the situation soon escalated to a riot in which 28 people were killed and over 75 were wounded. The violence in the city continued for several days until martial law was declared and federal troops were sent in. The Camp Jackson Affair as it was known triggered a crisis in the state as Governor Jackson and other pro-confederate officials went into exile and Union troops took over Jefferson City. Several months later the declaration of martial law was expanded throughout the state by Major General John C. Frémont in order to combat the secessionist militias in the state. Controversially, the declaration of martial law also included an emancipation provision which stated, "The property, real and personal, of all persons in the State of Missouri who shall take up arms against the United States, ... is declared to be confiscated to the public use; and their slaves, if any they have, are hereby declared free".
- Ex parte Milligan (1863) — On September 15, 1863, President Lincoln imposed Congressionally authorized martial law in the border states of Kentucky, Maryland and Missouri. The authorizing act allowed the President to suspend habeas corpus and civil rights throughout the entire United States (which he had already done under his own authority on April 27, 1861). Lincoln imposed the suspension on "prisoners of war, spies, or aiders and abettors of the enemy," as well as on other classes of people, such as draft dodgers. The President's proclamation was challenged in court case Ex parte Milligan, 71 US 2 [1866]. The Supreme Court ruled that Lincoln's imposition of martial law (by way of suspension of habeas corpus) was unconstitutional in areas where the local courts were still in session.

=== Reconstruction Era (1866–1877) ===
Following the end of the Civil War and the assassination of Abraham Lincoln the federal government began a process of reintegrating former Confederate states into the Union. President Johnson's approach focused on reconciliation and allowed the civilian governments in the south to restrict the rights of newly free people of color. After the election of 1866, Radical Republicans took control of Congress and inaugurated a new period of Reconstruction through the passage of legislation which placed all of the former confederate states, except Tennessee, into military districts in order to ensure the protection of civil rights in the region and the adoption of new amendments to the US Constitution. There were five districts in total, and each was administered by a military governor who oversaw the replacement of local officials who were seen as standing in the way of the objectives of Reconstruction. Once these goals were achieved the state would be readmitted to a civilian government.

All of the former Confederate states were readmitted by 1870. However, there continued to be a large military presence and portions of the region would be periodically placed under martial law to tamp down on civil unrest or racialized violence conducted by groups like the Ku Klux Klan. The President was authorized to suspend habeas corpus through legislation like the Enforcement Acts. Reconstruction ended with the withdrawal of federal troops by President Hayes following the Compromise of 1877.

=== The Great Chicago Fire (1871) ===
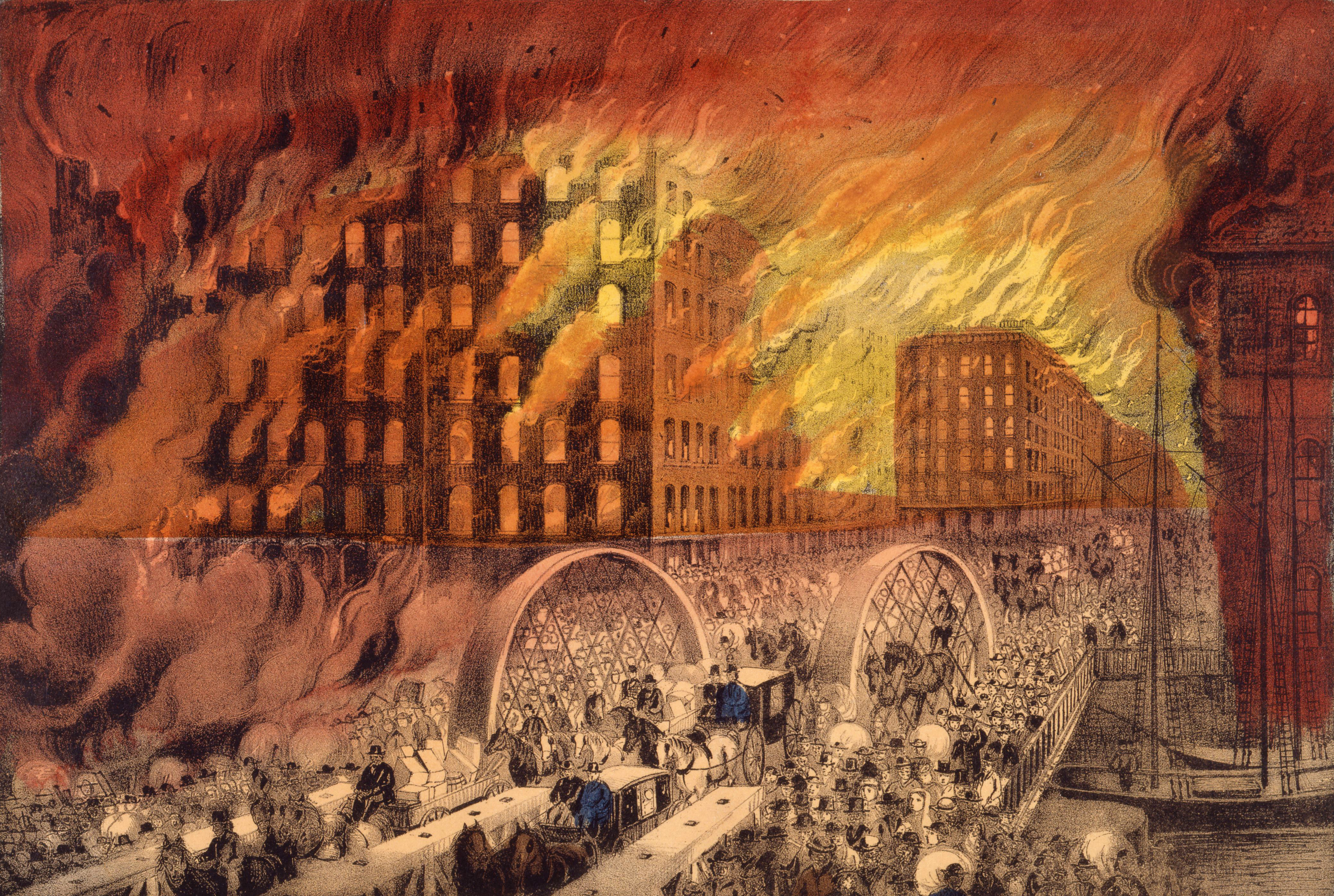
Artist's rendering of the Great Chicago Fire

In response to the Great Chicago Fire of 1871, Chicago mayor Roswell B. Mason declared a state of martial law and placed General Philip Sheridan in charge of the city on October 9, 1871. After the fire was extinguished, there were no widespread disturbances and martial law was lifted within a few days.

=== Seattle Riot of 1886 ===
Following the Chinese Exclusion Act in 1882, the Seattle riot of 1886 attempted to expel every Chinese person from the city. The previous November, white men raided Chinatown and forced the residents to a train station. The secretary of war had dispatched troops (many of which joined in the anti-Chinese activities), but by February the troops had left. This time, the white rioters forced the Chinese residents to pack and wait for a steamship, but when at least 300 of them could not afford the tickets, the mob kept them trapped on the docks. President Grover Cleveland declared martial law within the city and sent federal troops to stop the violence.

=== Coeur d'Alene, Idaho (1892) ===
In 1892, in Coeur d'Alene, Idaho, striking mineworkers blew up a mill and shot at strike-breaking workers. The explosion leveled a four-story building and killed one person. The governor declared martial law. At the same time, a request was made for federal troops to back guardsmen. Over 600 people were arrested. The list was whittled down to two dozen ringleaders who were tried in the military court. While in prison, the mine workers formed a new union, the Western Federation of Miners.

=== Galveston Hurricane of 1900 ===
The Galveston Hurricane of 1900 was the deadliest natural disaster in United States history. In the aftermath, Mayor Walter C. Jones declared martial law to facilitate recovery efforts and prevent looting. When not enough volunteers were found to clear the dead bodies, about 50 African Americans were forced at gunpoint to load corpses onto barges who were tasked with dumping bodies into the ocean. In the end, 43 African Americans were convicted by court martial and executed.

=== San Francisco earthquake of 1906 ===
Following the earthquake of 1906, the federal troops stationed in the Presidio were pressed into martial law service. They were posted throughout the city, and all dynamite was confiscated. The dynamite was used to destroy buildings in the path of fires to prevent the fires from spreading.

=== Colorado Coalfield War (1914) ===
In 1914, the imposition of martial law climaxed during the Colorado Coalfield War. Dating back decades, the conflicts came to a head in Ludlow, Colorado, in 1913. The Colorado National Guard was called in to quell the strikers. For a time, the peace was kept, but it is reported that the make-up of the Guard stationed at the mines began to shift from impartial normal troops to companies of loyal mine guards. Clashes increased and the proclamation of martial law was made by the governor, eventually resulting in the Ludlow Massacre. President Wilson sent in federal troops, eventually ending the violence.

=== Butte, Montana (1914) ===
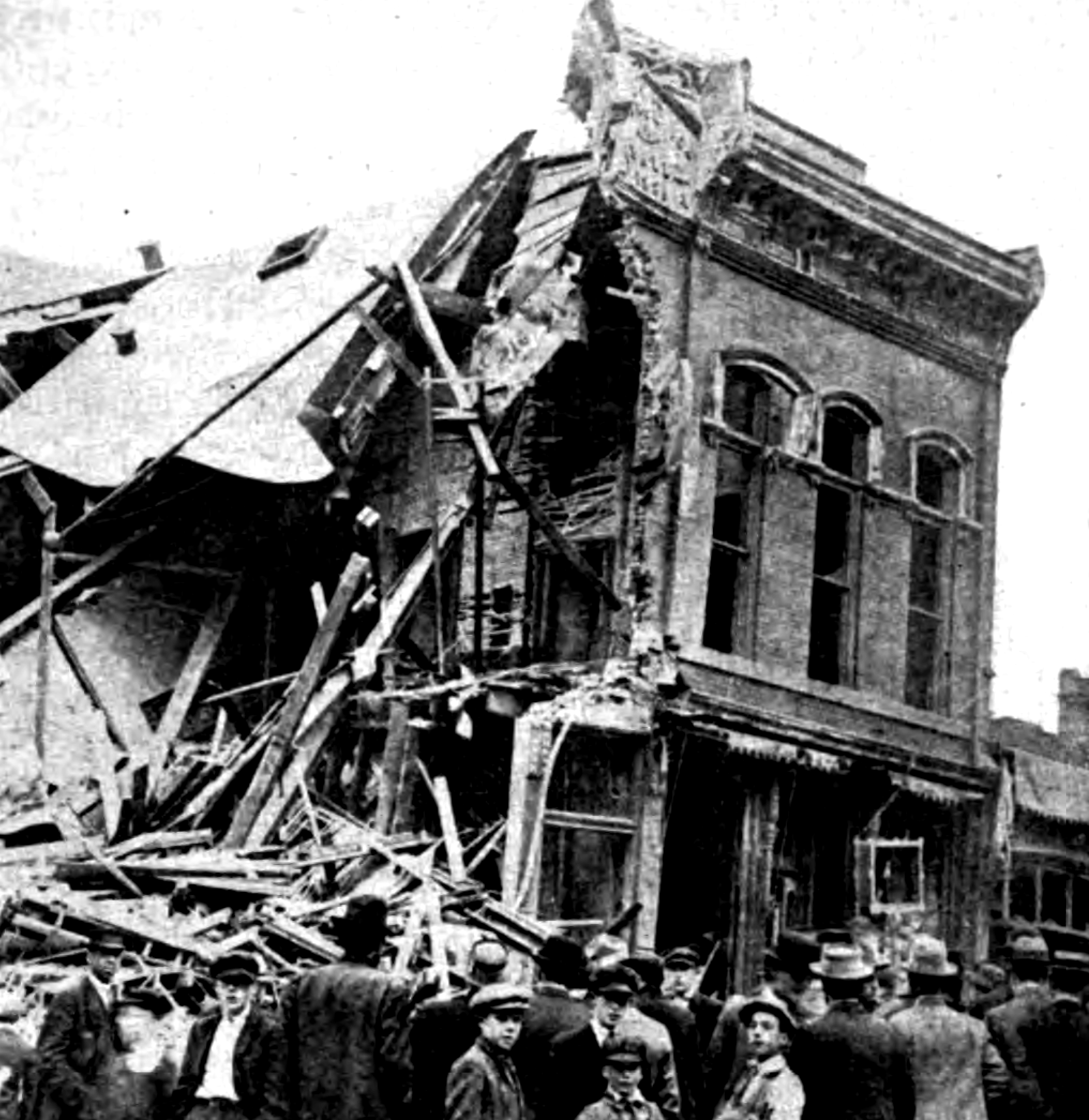
Union hall of the Western Federation of Miners local at Butte, Montana, after its destruction by dissident miners on 23 June 1914.

In 1914, mineworkers in Butte, Montana faced increasing divisions between the workers and the union leadership of the Western Federation of Miners (WFM) which had in recent years left the IWW and affiliated with the more conservative American Federation of Labor (AFL) over the IWW's more radical and openly militant rhetoric. Dissatisfied miners believed union leadership was in the pay of the Amalgamated Copper Company and accused the leadership of the WFM local of stuffing ballot boxes in union elections. On June 13, 1914, during the annual Miner's Union Day parade, dissident miners amassed and stormed the WFM's local headquarters, stole a safe containing $1,600, and destroyed records. When acting mayor Frank Curran went to the union hall to calm the crowds, he was thrown out of a second-story window. The riot grew and men were sprung from jail, newspapers were intimidated, and the home of a local union official was dynamited. Socialist mayor Lewis Duncan defended his decision to keep the police from interfering because he agreed that the WFM local leadership was corrupt, and he said that police involvement would have escalated the violence.

A week later several thousand miners formed an independent union called the Butte Mine Worker's Union (BMWU) and its leadership threatened direct action against anyone who opposed their formation or continued to be a member of the WFM. On June 23, WFM national president Charles Moyer arrived in Butte to try and resolve differences between the WFM and the new union. While conducting a meeting in the union hall, the building was surrounded by a mob and when one miner attempted to enter the building he was shot, initiating a gunfight. Some members of the mob stole dynamite from the nearby copper mine and set it off destroying the building. While the crowd had been preventing the WFM members from leaving the hall, the people inside had managed to escape out the back down a fire escape before the detonation. Local authorities insisted to the state government that the situation did not require the use of the National Guard. On August 30, another dynamite explosion blew up an office of the Amalgamated Copper Company. The next day, Governor Sam V. Stewart declared martial law in Butte. National guardsmen were sent in and the leaders of the BMWU were arrested and the publication of the local socialist newspaper was halted. Mayor Duncan and the local sheriff were removed from office for failing to perform their duties. The local mines stopped recognizing union membership and returned to running as open shops.

Martial law ended on November 12, 1914, but over the next several years the National Guard would periodically return to Butte as the result of strikes and riots.

=== Spokane, Washington (1917) ===
On August 19, 1917, the Spokane office of the Industrial Workers of the World (IWW, or Wobblies) was raided, leaders arrested, and martial law was declared. The military authority was the National Guard, controlled by the U.S. War Department. This occurred in reaction to a demand by IWW leader James Rowan that all prisoners of the "class war" (he meant Wobbly strikers and strike leaders involved in a statewide lumber strike) be released or Spokane would face a general strike. The repression of the democratic, radical union in Spokane and across the state took place in the context of the Wobbly-led loggers' and sawmill workers' ongoing strike for the eight-hour day and sanitary conditions in the camps. The IWW was militant, radical, vocal and consistently nonviolent. The larger context of the repression of the union was war hysteria, combined with employer opposition to union demands. The nationwide suppression of the IWW during the war involved physical violence, vandalism, and the imprisonment of hundreds of union members and leaders.

=== West Virginia Coal Wars (1920–1921) ===
During the events of the West Virginia Coal Wars (1920–1921), martial law was declared in the state of West Virginia. At the behest of Governor Cornwell, federal troops had been dispatched to Mingo County to deal with the striking miners. The army officer in charge acted, ostensibly, under the Suspension Clause of Article I of the United States Constitution (selectively; accounts show that he jailed only union miners), and did not allow assembly of any kind. If his soldiers found any union miners, they immediately took them and imprisoned them. The jails filled up so quickly that he had to release miners. As it went, miners were arrested, jailed, and released without any sort of trial. After a time, when the trial of Sid Hatfield began, the military occupation and "veritable military dictatorship" (Governor Cornwell) of the army officer ended. Many of the miners were not released from jail. It was only the first of three times that federal troops would be called to quiet the miners in the West Virginia Mine War.

=== Texas and Oklahoma Oil Fields (1931–1933) ===
The discovery of the East Texas Oilfield caused a surge in production which caused a collapse in petroleum prices. The ongoing Great Depression multiplied economic concerns and many individuals began drilling for oil in violation of state and federal limits. In August 1931, in response to the crisis Texas Governor Ross Sterling ordered that wells be shut down using military force to limit "wasteful production". The order was in place for several months, but the United States Supreme Court intervened in the case Sterling v. Constantin, 287 U.S. 378 (1932). The unanimous decision ruled that the use of martial law in this case was not proper.

On multiple occasions in 1932 and 1933, Oklahoma Governor William H. Murray also placed several counties under martial law in order to enforce regulations in their own oil fields.

=== San Francisco, California (1934) ===
In 1934, California Governor Frank Merriam placed the docks of San Francisco under martial law, citing "riots and tumult" resulting from a dock worker's strike. The governor threatened to place the entire city under martial law. The National Guard was called in to open the docks, and a citywide institution of martial law was averted when goods began to flow. The guardsmen were empowered to make arrests and to then try detainees or turn them over to the courts.

=== Bismarck, North Dakota (1934) ===
On July 17, 1934 Governor William Langer of North Dakota was found guilty by the State Supreme Court of political corruption and defrauding the federal government. As a result of this conviction, the court ordered Langer was to be removed from office and Lieutenant Governor Ole Olson was now the governor. Langer contested this decision, barricaded himself in the governor's mansion and declared martial law throughout the state and mustered the national guard in order to prevent the enforcement of his removal. While barricaded, Langer drafted a "Declaration of Independence for the State of North Dakota" to circumvent federal authority. The leaders in the national guard however did not support Langer and the next morning he relented, vacating the office to Olson who was sworn in as governor and withdrew the declaration of martial law.

=== Minneapolis, Minnesota (1934) ===
In 1934, Minnesota Governor Floyd B. Olson placed the city of Minneapolis under martial law and deployed the National Guardsmen of the 34th Infantry Division due to escalating violence during the Minneapolis general strike of 1934 after Bloody Friday when police opened fire on picketers.

On July 26, and these deaths of protesters at the hands of the police, Farmer-Labor governor Olson declared martial law and mobilized four thousand National Guardsmen of the 34th Infantry. Following this mobilization, there was no further loss of life.

Between July 26 and August 1, the National Guard began issuing operating permits to truck drivers, and engaging in roving patrols, curfews, and security details. On August 1, National Guard troops seized strike headquarters and placed arrested union leaders in a stockade at the state fairgrounds in Saint Paul. The next day, the headquarters were restored to the union and the leaders released from the stockade, as the National Guard carried out a token raid on the Citizens Alliance headquarters.

The union appealed to the Central Labor Union for a general strike and the governor issued an ultimatum that he would stop all trucks by midnight, August 5, if there was no settlement. Nevertheless, by August 14, there were thousands of trucks operating under military permits. Although the strike was gravely weakened by martial law and economic pressure, union leaders made it clear that it would continue.

On August 21, a federal mediator got acceptance of a settlement proposal from A. W. Strong, head of the Citizens Alliance, incorporating the union's major demands. The settlement was ratified and the back of employer resistance to unionization in Minneapolis was broken.

=== Evansville, Indiana (1937) ===
During the Great Flood of 1937, since Evansville was submerged in about 54 feet of water, the city was placed under martial law until the area was drained of water.

=== Territory of Hawaii in World War II (1941–1944) ===
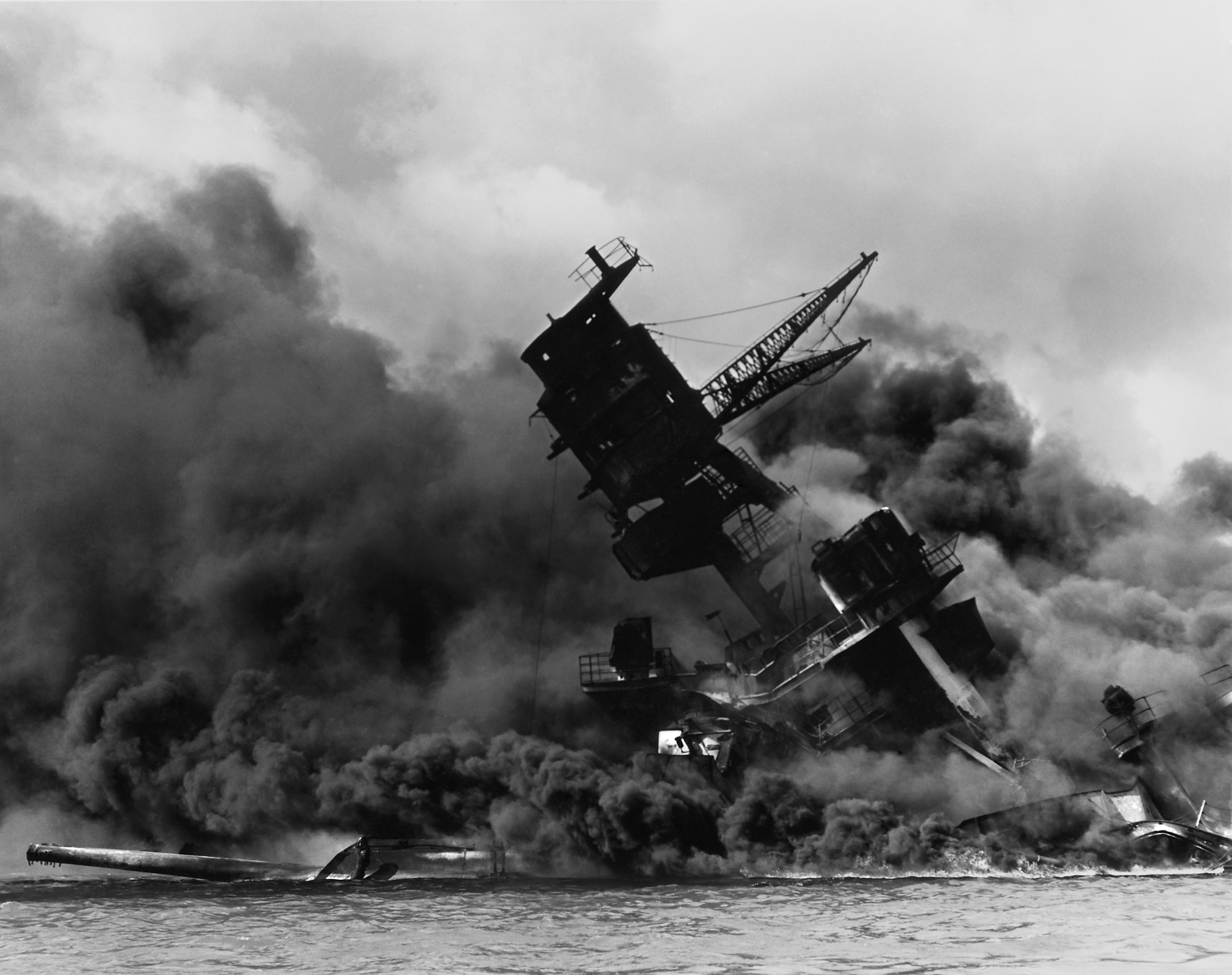
Hawaii was put under martial law after the Japanese attack on Pearl Harbor

During World War II (1939–1945) what is now the State of Hawaii was held under martial law from December 7, 1941, to October 24, 1944, following the Japanese attack on Pearl Harbor. During 1942, the army's Hawaii District was commanded by Ralph McT. Pennell, who coordinated the defenses of Hawaii and reported to the military governor. After the war, one of the federal judges for the islands, Judge J. Frank McLaughln, condemned the conduct of martial law, saying, "Gov. Poindexter declared lawfully martial law but the Army went beyond the governor and set up that which was lawful only in conquered enemy territory namely, military government which is not bound by the Constitution. And they ... threw the Constitution into the discard and set up a military dictatorship."

=== Russell County, Alabama (1954–1955) ===
Alabama Governor Gordon Persons placed Russell County under martial law in June 1954 due to the pervasive influence of organized crime gangs. The National Guard assumed law enforcement duties in the county for the remainder of the year, shut down gang-controlled establishments, and oversaw the first lawful elections in decades.

=== Freedom Riders (1961) ===
On May 21, 1961, Governor Patterson of Alabama declared martial law "as a result of outside agitators coming into Alabama to violate our laws and customs" which had led to "outbreaks of lawlessness and mob action." The "outside agitators" were "Freedom Riders", peaceful civil rights activists challenging the already-illegal racial segregation in the South.

=== Cambridge, Maryland (1963) ===
In response to anti-segregation protests in the city of Cambridge, Governor J. Millard Tawes declared martial law to prevent further clashes between pro-segregationists and the local chapter of the Student Nonviolent Coordinating Committee. The order remained in place for over a year, the longest stint since Reconstruction, and was the last incidence to date that martial law has been declared in the United States.

=== 2007 National Defense Authorization Act ===
H.R. 5122, also known as the John Warner National Defense Authorization Act for Fiscal Year 2007, was a bill passed in the United States Congress on September 29, 2006, and signed by President George W. Bush on October 17, 2006, becoming Public Law 109-364. In addition to allocating funding for the armed forces, it also gave the president the power to declare martial law and to take command of the National Guard units of each state without the consent of state governors.

On April 2, 2007, US Senate held hearings about recent changes to the Insurrection Act of 1807, (in Sec 1072 of Defense Authorization Act) where Sen. Patrick Leahy of Vermont sought to reverse the 2006 amendments to the Insurrection Act, which had given the US President new powers to use military for domestic disturbance, terrorism, insurrection, etc, and even changed the name from "Insurrection Act" to "Enforcement of the Laws to Restore Public Order." In the Senate Hearing, Senator Kit Bond testified: "Mr. Chairman, the measure that was included in last year's congressional Defense Authorization Act I think was ill-conceived, unnecessary, and dumb. Even some of the members of the SASC who should have did not know about it. But this is an influential panel, and you know how it has changed the old law, and we now know that all 50 of our Nation's Governors, Adjutants General, and local law enforcement are opposed to it. Nobody knows where it came from. Allowing the President to invoke the Act and declare martial law where public order breaks down as a result of natural disaster, epidemic, terrorist attack, is very ambiguous and gives him broad authority potentially to usurp the role of the Governors".

Based on opposition by Congress, individual state Governors, law enforcement community, and absence of clarity on who even introduced these changes, the 'Enforcement of the Laws to Restore Public Order' law was repealed on January 28, 2008, (based on Sen. Pat Leahy's S. 513 proposal to repeal) and the previous Insurrection Act was restored. As of 2020, the Insurrection Act of 1807 still applies in limiting a US President's ability under Title 10 to federalize National Guard troops for martial law purposes.

== See also ==
- District of Columbia Home Rule Act § Emergency takeover of police
