= Military aid to the civil power =

Use of armed forces to support bringing order and peace domestically

Aid to the Civil Power (ACP) or Military Aid to the Civil Power (MACP) is the use of the armed forces in support of the civil authorities of a state. Different countries have varying policies regarding the relationship between their military and civil authorities.

== Australia ==
Under certain circumstances, the Australian Defence Force can be called upon to assist with law enforcement. State or territory civilian police have primary responsibility for law and order. Under section 119 of the Constitution of Australia, "The Commonwealth shall protect every State against invasion and, on the application of the Executive Government of the State, against domestic violence." This is further explained in section 51 of the Defence Act which states that:

Where the Governor of a State has proclaimed that domestic violence exists therein, the Governor-General, upon the application of the Executive Government of the State, may, by proclamation, declare that domestic violence exists in that State, and may call out the Permanent Forces and in the event of their numbers being insufficient may also call out such of the Emergency Forces and the Reserve Forces as may be necessary for the protection of that State, and the services of the Forces so called out may be utilised accordingly for the protection of that State against domestic violence.

Military forces have been deployed twice on the request of state or territory governments, and deployment authorised on one other occasion but not required:

- September 1970: The governor-general signed an order-in-council authorising the deployment of the army to East New Britain Province of Papua New Guinea, then a territory of Australia, to assist local police with riot control if necessary. The army was not required and the order was revoked in April 1971.
- February 1978: Following the Sydney Hilton bombing, 2,000 armed soldiers were deployed to Bowral and Mittagong to protect the Commonwealth Heads of Government Regional Meeting and to protect the road and rail links between Sydney and the Southern Highlands.
- March 2002: 2,400 military personnel were deployed to protect the Commonwealth Heads of Government Meeting at Coolum Beach, Queensland, including armed F/A-18 Hornets patrolling overhead, just months after the September 11 terrorist attacks.

Australian military regulations also allow the federal government to use military forces "on its own initiative, for the protection of its servants or property, or the safeguarding of its interests". This has been done three times:

- April 1983: RF-111C reconnaissance aircraft were used to investigate construction work by the government of Tasmania which was preparing to dam the Gordon River in contravention of federal law. The evidence from the reconnaissance flights was used to gain an injunction from the High Court of Australia against the work.
- September 1989: Soldiers were deployed to Joint Defense Facility Nurrungar during a large political demonstration in which 300 protesters broke through the perimeter fence.
- August 2001: The Special Air Service Regiment was used during the Tampa affair.

In addition, unarmed troops and defence force equipment have been used in industrial disputes, such as the 1949 Australian coal strike and the 1989 Australian pilots' dispute, under the "safeguarding of its interests" provisions.

== Austria ==
The Austrian Armed Forces can be requested by all authorities on federal, state, district or municipal level in their respective sphere of competence in exceptional events. The federal government has to approve a deployment, if more than 100 soldiers are requested. ACP and MACP (called Assistenzeinsatz / AssE) can only be temporary, but are used extensively in Austria:

Deployments to support Law enforcement in Austria:

- in September 1990, after the end of the Cold War period, the Iron Curtain was demolished, but Austria had no border guard, so the military was ordered to guard the border lines. It was planned to end this deployment after 10 weeks, but it lasted until December 2011.
- in September 2013 military had to support the federal police during the Annaberg shooting, where three police officers and paramedic were murdered by a poacher.
- in September 2015 due to the European migrant crisis the Austrian military was deployed to the borders again. This deployment is still ongoing (in 2023)
- since August 2016 the military is guarding diplomatic missions and vulnerable institutions in Vienna
- in May 2020 soldiers and reservists started to support law enforcement during the COVID-19 pandemic in Austria. This deployment lasted until 2022.

Deployments to support civil authorities:

- in general, Austrian military is deployed in case of weather or environmental disasters
- in May 2020 soldiers and reservists started to support civil authorities and health care facilities during the COVID-19 pandemic in Austria. This deployment lasted until 2022.

== Canada ==
Canada has provisions, similar to the UK's military aid to the civil authorities, for military aid to the civil power inscribed in its National Defence Act, a historical inheritance from its days as a British dominion. However, the application is significantly different due to the federal nature of Canada, where the maintenance of law and order is the exclusive right and responsibility of the provinces.

The political authority empowered to requisition military aid to the civil power is therefore the solicitor general of the affected province in accordance with the National Defence Act, rather than the War Measures Act or its subsequent replacement, the Emergencies Act. This requisition is forwarded directly to the Chief of the Defence Staff (not to the federal government of Canada) who is obligated by law to execute the request. However, the Chief of the Defence Staff alone can determine the nature and level of forces to be committed.

The requesting province may subsequently be billed to pay the cost of the military aid, although the federal government most often waives it. One exception was when Toronto mayor Mel Lastman requested military assistance following the North American blizzard of 1999 and the Ontario government acceded. At least 438 Canadian Forces (CAF) members were deployed. This deployment was deemed by the Canadian government to be a trivialization of the military's emergency response role, and the requesting authority was billed accordingly.

While the military is legally free to decide how to deal with an issue in regard to which it has been called out, in practice it works under the direction of the police forces or government of the province that has requested its aid. Such requests are made relatively often for specialized resources such as armoured vehicles (e.g. hostage situations) and technical capabilities not possessed by police forces.

They are also called out in the case of police strikes in those provinces that have unionised provincial police forces. Quebec has not hesitated to call on the CAF for such help because the CAF is the only other agency with French-speaking units able to replace striking police; the Royal Canadian Mounted Police has few reserves able to provide a "surge" capability, and its French-speaking capability is limited.

Significant use of the CAF in aid of the Quebec civil power includes two major civil crises:

- the October Crisis of 1970
- the Oka Crisis of 1990

As well, the military has been called in to deal with labour crises, such as cavalry troops shipped to Edmonton to deal with an expected unemployed riot in 1931 and armoured cars against strikers at Stratford, Ontario, in 1934. As well, in 1837 prior to Confederation, British troops were used to put down domestic rebellions in Upper and Lower Canada, and in the early years of existence as a federation, the Canadian Militia was mobilized for First Nations and Métis insurrections in its territories, 1869 and 1885 (the first and second Riel Rebellions).

The federal government can and does use the military in aid of its own responsibilities, such as guarding federal buildings and facilities. Since 1993, the Canadian Armed Forces have also provided the country's federal counter-terrorism forces, replacing the Royal Canadian Mounted Police in that function. (See JTF2 for details of request and control of this capability.)

== Germany ==
The post-war Constitution of Germany strictly forbids the use of military force in police functions. In order to split the power of the government, the functions that MACP has in other countries are carried out by special or specialized police forces like the Bereitschaftspolizei units, each with a high number of officers, of each state police force, which are under the control of the state governments and not of the federal government.

For some actions, federal police forces can be used either by orders of the federal administration and federal judiciary or by request of the state government. The counter-terrorist unit GSG 9 is part of the Bundespolizei (until 2005 known as the Bundesgrenzschutz) and is well known in Germany for its antiterrorist missions. However, several state police corps maintains similar units, the SEK (Spezialeinsatzkommando). The Bundesgrenzschutz and the GSG 9 were historically combatants and they had military ranks, but have always been under the control of the Ministry of the Interior, similar to the internal troops in Eastern Europe during the Cold War period.

This strict separation between civil and military power was enacted to prevent the army from becoming a political power again in internal affairs and to secure its subordination to the civil power. Since the 1990s, a number of conservative politicians has called for an abolition of this rule, but there seems to be no majority for such a change.

But a new law was passed in September 2004, the Air Security Act (Luftsicherheitsgesetz). From September 24, 2004 until February 2005 there was an exception from the use of military force regarding air security: In a case of imminent danger, the Bundeswehr and its air force branch, the German Air Force were authorised to use force against an aircraft.

As ultima ratio, the Minister of Defense was empowered to give the order to shoot down an aircraft if the aircraft was used as a weapon against humans and there was no other way to repel the attack. Air policing is a traditional task of the German Air Force. However, the Luftsicherheitsgesetz was declared unconstitutional on February 15, 2006, by the Federal Constitutional Court of Germany (Bundesverfassungsgericht). The court held that no civil aircraft may be shot down, even if the aircraft is used as a weapon by terrorist. The court held that the passengers' dignity and right to life would be violated if the aircraft was shot down.

In 2012, the Bundesverfassungsgericht judged that the military may intervene in "exceptional, imminent incidents of catastrophic scale" as a last resort. In the case of a hijacked plane by terrorists, the German Air Force may force the plane back or fire warning shots – a downing of the plane remains forbidden, unless every passenger of the plane is a terrorist. Such a case of "exceptional, imminent incidents of catastrophic scale" has to be determined, as ruled by the Bundesverfassungsgericht in 2013, by the whole Cabinet of Germany (Bundesregierung), declaring a regulation void that previously allowed the Federal Minister of Defence (Bundesverteidigungsminister) to decide solely.

== Indonesia ==
In Indonesia, the Indonesian National Armed Forces (TNI) is regulated in the "Tri Darma Eka Karma" Doctrine of the TNI which states the role of the military to be involved in non-combat roles known as "OMSP" (Operasi Militer Selain Perang) translated: "Military operations other than war". This role is stated that the Military's purpose for conducting the "OMSP" is to basically maintain the country's sovereignty and territorial integrity and maintaining the safety of the nation as well as helping to improve the welfare of the people. According to the Commander of the Indonesian National Armed Forces General Hadi Tjahjanto, the tasks of the military in conducting the OMSP is to implement duties such as counter terrorism, border security, assisting regional governments, assisting the Indonesian National Police (Polri), disaster relief, assist security during state visits, as well as carrying out peacekeeping operations under the United Nations. The Indonesian National Armed Forces is also in charge and responsible for the security of the President and Vice President, Former President and Former Vice-President along with their families and foreign VVIPs (Head of state or head of government) visiting Indonesia.

The Indonesian military to this day continues to be heavily involved in state civil affairs. According to the TNI commander, one of the role of the military is to basically assist the Indonesian National Police in terms of national security and order. The military are also likely to be called upon in response to civil unrest incidents which happen in the country such as the incidents which took place in Papua, Aceh, Poso, and Jakarta, other than that, the military is also involved in many tasks concerning to assist in security during national civil occasions such as during the national elections. The military are also likely to be deployed to assist the police during big-scale riots and protests which occur in urban settings near vital installations. Sometimes, the military are also posted in vital public locations together with the police such as in airports and railway stations during peak seasons.

Other than assisting the police, the military also assists other civil government institutions such as the National Search and Rescue Agency during disaster relief operations. Currently, responding to the COVID-19 pandemic, the Indonesian military has been highly involved in tackling the pandemic.

== Ireland ==
In Ireland, the Defence Forces provide assistance through Aid to the Civil Power (ATCP) arrangements to the Government of Ireland. The Army, Naval Service and Air Corps also provide Aid to Civil Community and Aid to Government departments, particularly in a supplementary role to the Garda Síochána, the national police force. Responsibilities include national security (Supplementing high risk prisoner escort, intelligence), cash escorts, explosive ordnance disposal, maritime safety, search and rescue, drug interdiction (Navy), fisheries protection (Navy), patrols of vital state installations and border patrols (including armed checkpoints), air ambulance service and non-combatant evacuation. Examples include; Garda Air Support Unit (GASU) aircraft being flown and maintained by Air Corps personnel, the Air Corps and Naval Service assisting in search and rescue (the Irish Coast Guard (IRCG) is a civilian agency which operates in the Republic of Ireland and some parts of Northern Ireland), the Army Ranger Wing (ARW) carrying out domestic counter-terrorism operations and the Directorate of Military Intelligence carrying out domestic counter-intelligence duties.

A request for the Defence Forces to aid civil authorities is known as a C70 request. One was issued on 9 April 2026 in relation to the 2026 Irish fuel protests.

== Italy ==
In 2008 the Italian Government decided to use soldiers from the Army, Navy and Air Force to patrol cities and protect high-value buildings (embassies, consulates, monuments). When military personnel patrol cities they are always accompanied by an agent from the Polizia di Stato (State Police), a military from the Carabinieri or a military from Guardia di Finanza.

Carabinieri are the 4th Armed force in Italy while Guardia di Finanza are a military body and are regular police forces with military status in Italy.

== United Kingdom ==
In the United Kingdom, Military Aid to the Civil Power is one of the three classifications of Military Aid to the Civil Authorities. MACP encompasses the provision of military assistance (armed if necessary) in its maintenance of law, order and public safety using specialist capabilities or equipment in situations beyond the capability of the Civil Power. This includes capabilities such as Explosive Ordnance Disposal and mountain rescue (where it is provided by the Royal Air Force Mountain Rescue Service).

Commander Home Command is the Standing Joint Commander responsible for the planning and execution of civil contingency operations within the UK landmass and territorial waters during any military aid to UK civil authorities.

== United States ==
The Posse Comitatus Act, passed in 1878, generally prohibits Federal military personnel (except the United States Coast Guard) and units of the United States National Guard under Federal authority from acting in a law enforcement capacity within the United States, except where expressly authorized by the Constitution or Congress.

The original act only referred to the Army, but the Air Force was added in 1956 and the Navy and Marine Corps have been included by a regulation of the Department of Defense. This law is mentioned whenever it appears that the Department of Defense is interfering in domestic disturbances.

However, the National Guard may still be used for police-like duties if still under control of the state, as with the 1967 Detroit riot. Repeated caveats have been added to the Posse Comitatus Act over the years by subsequent legislation.

On June 1, 2020, President Donald Trump threatened to invoke the Insurrection Act of 1807 in response to riots following the murder of George Floyd.

== See also ==
- Civilian control of the military
- Military Aid to the Civil Community
- Gendarmerie
- German Federal Police
- Vigipirate
- Separation of military and police roles
