= Military operations other than war (US) =

American perspective on armed forces bringing order and peace domestically

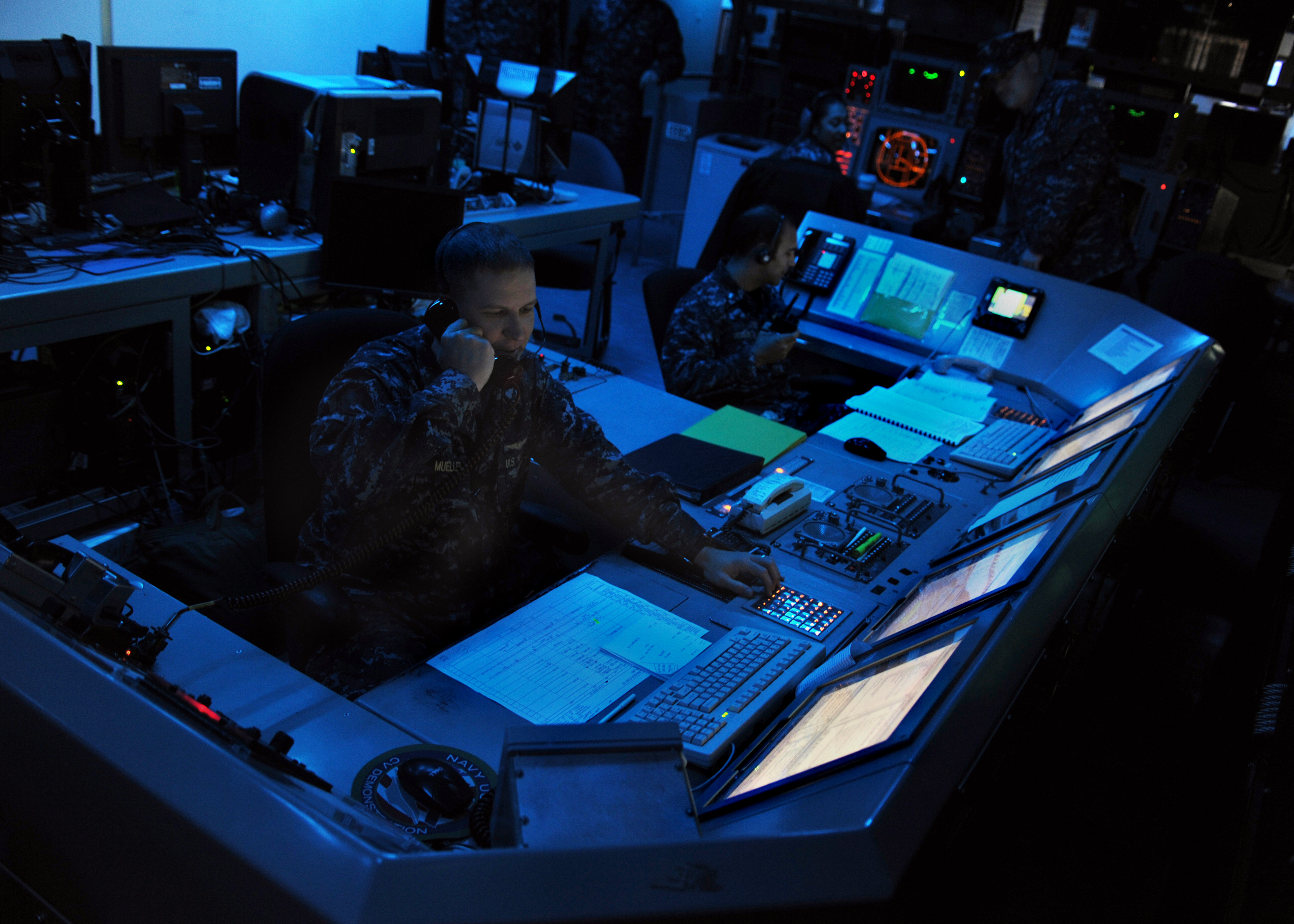
US Navy officers aboard the aircraft carrier USS Abraham Lincoln (CVN-72) monitor defense systems during maritime security operations.

Military operations other than war (MOOTW) in the United States focus on deterring war, resolving conflict, promoting peace, and supporting civil authorities in response to domestic crises.

In United States military doctrine, military operations other than war includes the use of military capabilities across a range of operations that fall short of war. Because of political considerations, MOOTW operations normally have more restrictive rules of engagement (ROE) than in war.

MOOTW not involving the use or threat of force include humanitarian assistance, disaster relief, arms control and peacekeeping.

== Fundamental principles ==
Several fundamental principles can be adduced from military operations other than war: objective, unity of effort, security, restraint, perseverance, and legitimacy. The first three are derived from the principles of war, and the remaining three are MOOTW-specific.

1. Objective: The aim of MOOTW is to direct every military operation toward a clearly defined, decisive, and attainable objective. Inherent in the principle of objective is the need to understand what constitutes mission success, and what might cause the operation to be terminated before success is achieved.
2. Unity of Effort
3. Security: The goal here is to never permit hostile factions to acquire a military, political, or informational advantage.
4. Restraint: Judicious use of force is necessary, carefully balancing the need for security, the conduct of operations, and the political objective. Commanders at all levels must take proactive steps to ensure their personnel know and understand the ROE and are quickly informed of changes, otherwise it can result in fratricide, mission failure, and national embarrassment. ROE in MOOTW are generally more restrictive, detailed, and sensitive to political concerns than in war.
5. Perseverance: Some MOOTW may require years to achieve the desired results.
6. Legitimacy: The goal here is to have committed forces sustain the legitimacy of the operation and of the host government, where applicable. In MOOTW, legitimacy is a condition based on the perception by a specific audience of the legality, morality, or rightness of a set of actions.

== Types ==
- Arms Control b39
- Combatting Terrorism: This includes antiterrorism and counterterrorism. Antiterrorism programs are defensive measures taken to reduce vulnerability to terrorist acts and form the foundation for effectively combatting terrorism. Counterterrorism is offensive measures taken to prevent, deter and respond to terrorism, which provides response measures that include preemptive, retaliatory, and rescue operations.
- DOD Support to Counterdrug Operations
- Enforcement of Sanctions and/or Maritime Security Operations (MSO), Maritime Intercept Operations, Visit, Board, Search, and Seizure (VBSS)
- Enforcing Exclusion Zones
- Ensuring Freedom of Navigation and Overflight
- Humanitarian Assistance: HA operations relieve or reduce the results of natural or manmade disasters or other endemic conditions such as human pain, disease, hunger, or privation in countries or regions outside the United States.
- Defense Support of Civil Authorities (DSCA): These operations can consist of temporary augmentation of air traffic controllers and postal workers during strikes, restoration of law and order after a riot, protection of life and federal property, or providing relief in the aftermath of natural disaster. The Posse Comitatus Act prohibits the use of federal military forces to enforce or otherwise execute laws unless expressly authorized by the Constitution or Act of Congress. Examples of DSCA are disaster relief provided during Hurricanes Andrew and Iniki in 1992, and deployment of troops during the 1992 Los Angeles riots and George Floyd protests.
- Nation Assistance and/or Support to Counterinsurgency:
- Security assistance refers to a group of programs by which the United States provides defense articles, military training, and other defense-related services to foreign nations by grant, loan, credit, or cash sales.
- Noncombatant Evacuation Operations (NEO)
- Peace Operations (PO): Military PO are categorized as peacekeeping operations (PKO) and peace enforcement operations (PEO).

PKO are military operations undertaken with the consent of all major parties to a dispute, designed to monitor and facilitate implementation of an agreement and support diplomatic efforts to reach a long-term political settlement. PEO are the application of military force, or threat of its use, normally pursuant to international authorization, to compel compliance with resolutions or sanctions designed to maintain or restore peace and order.

- Protection of Shipping: Protection of shipping includes coastal sea control, harbor defense, port security, countermine operations, and environmental defense.
- Recovery Operations: Recovery operations are conducted to search for, locate, identify, rescue, and return personnel or human remains, sensitive equipment, or items critical to national security.
- Show of Force Operations: These operations involve increased visibility of US deployed forces in an attempt to defuse a specific situation.
- Strikes and Raids: Strikes are offensive operations conducted to inflict damage on, seize, or destroy an objective for political purposes. Strikes may be used for punishing offending nations or groups, upholding international law, or preventing those nations or groups from launching their own offensive actions. A raid is usually a small-scale operation involving swift penetration of hostile territory to secure information, confuse the enemy, or destroy installations. It ends with a planned withdrawal upon completion of the assigned mission.
- Support to Insurgency: US forces may provide logistic and training support to an insurgency, but normally do not themselves conduct combat operations.

-Peacekeeping -Contingency Operations -Non-combatant Evacuation Operations, or NEOs -Combat terrorism -Aid host nations through security assistance -Enforce United Nations economic sanctions -Intercept vessels -Plan and execute disaster relief, humanitarian assistance, and civil support operations -Conduct public health operations -Assist interagency counter-drug operations -Show the flag.

== Select American deployments ==
- 2004-5 Indian Ocean earthquake and tsunami: Emergency relief and medical assistance.

== See also ==
- Effects-Based Operations (EBO)
- Civil-Military Co-operation (CIMIC)
- Low intensity conflict
- Counter-insurgency
- Divide and rule
- Fourth generation warfare
