= Insurrection Act of 1807 =

United States law

- Long title: An Act authorizing the employment of the land and naval forces of the United States, in cases of insurrections
- Enacted by: the 9th United States Congress
- Effective: March 3, 1807

Citations
- Public law: 9-39
- Statutes at Large: 2 Stat. 443

Legislative history
- Signed into law by President Thomas Jefferson on March 3, 1807

Major amendments
- 1871, 2006, 2007

United States Supreme Court cases
- Prize Cases, 67 U.S. 635 (1863)

The Insurrection Act of 1807, or just the Insurrection Act, is the U.S. federal law that empowers the president of the United States to nationally deploy the Armed Forces and to federalize the National Guard units of the individual states in specific circumstances, such as the suppression of civil disorder, of insurrection, and of armed rebellion against the federal government. The Insurrection Act provides a statutory exception to the Posse Comitatus Act (1878) that limits the president's deploying the U.S. military to enforce either civil law or criminal law within the United States.

After invoking and before exercising the powers authorized under the Insurrection Act, Title 10 U.S.C. § 254 requires the publication of a presidential proclamation whereby the U.S. President formally orders the dispersion of the peoples committing civil unrest or armed rebellion. The Defense Department guidelines define "homeland defense" as a constitutional exception to the restrictions of the Posse Comitatus Act; therefore, the political, military, and police measures necessary to protect national security from external threats are exceptions to the restrictions of the act.

== Purpose and content ==
The Insurrection Act of 1807 empowers the U.S. president to call into service the U.S. Armed Forces and the National Guard:

- when requested by a state's legislature or governor, if the legislature cannot be convened, to quell an insurrection against that state (§ 251),
- to address unlawful obstructions, combinations, or assemblages, or rebellion in any state, which renders impracticable the enforcement of the law (§ 252), and
- to address an insurrection, domestic violence, unlawful combination, or conspiracy, in any state, which results in the deprivation of constitutionally secured rights, and where the state is unable, fails, or refuses to protect said rights (§ 253).

As a federal law, the Insurrection Act of 1807 replaced the earlier Calling Forth Act of 1792 that allowed the federalization of state militias. The legal language of the Insurrection Act allowed for either the federalization of state militias or the use of regular army forces to quell any rebellion against a state government. The Insurrection Act did not stipulate any criminal penalty for insurrectionists, which penalty later was introduced by the Confiscation Act of 1862. The original text of the Insurrection Act of 1807 is:

That in all cases of insurrection, or obstruction to the laws, either of the United States, or of any individual state or territory, where it is lawful for the President of the United States to call forth the militia for the purpose of suppressing such insurrection, or of causing the laws to be duly executed, it shall be lawful for him to employ, for the same purposes, such part of the land or naval force of the United States, as shall be judged necessary, having first observed all the pre-requisites of the law in that respect.

The Insurrection Act of 1807 has been twice modified. The first modification was in 1861, when the federal government of President Abraham Lincoln anticipated continued Confederate resistance after the Union Army's military defeats in the opening months of the American Civil War (1861–1865); the new clause allowed the federal government to federalize and deploy state militias and the regular army — against the will of the state government — in order to quell any "rebellion against the authority of the government of the United States".

The second modification was the Third Enforcement Act in 1871 (§ 253) to protect Black Americans from attack by the Ku Klux Klan. The second modification of the Insurrection Act allowed the federal government to enforce the Equal Protection Clause of the Fourteenth Amendment to the U.S. Constitution.

U.S. presidents invoked the Insurrection Act of 1807 during the Reconstruction era (1865–1877) in the 19th century, and during the racial desegregation era to protect the Civil rights movement (1954–1968) in the 20th century.

In 2006, Public Law 109-163 added Guam to the definition of a state under the act. The Virgin Islands were already considered one. In 2016, Public Law 114-328 amended the act to move from §§331-335 to §§251-255; §252 indicates that the “Use of militia and armed forces to enforce Federal authority”:

Whenever the President considers that unlawful obstructions, combinations, or assemblages, or rebellion against the authority of the United States, make it impracticable to enforce the laws of the United States in any State, by the ordinary course of judicial proceedings, he may call into Federal service such of the militia of any State, and use such of the armed forces, as he considers necessary, to enforce those laws or to suppress the rebellion.

== Application ==
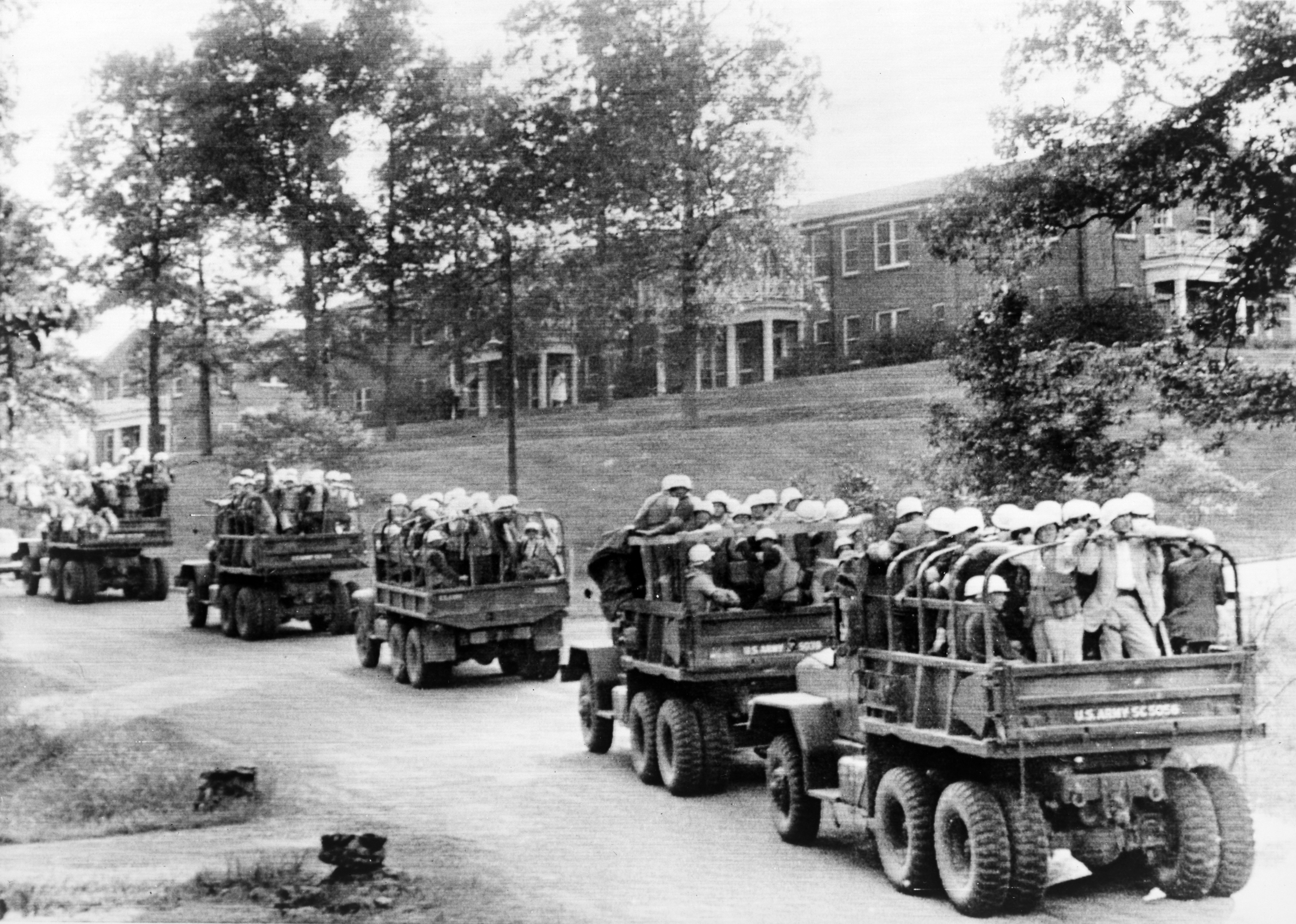
U.S. Army trucks on campus following the Ole Miss riot of 1962, when President John F. Kennedy invoked the act

The Insurrection Act has been invoked many times throughout American history. In the late 19th and early 20th centuries, it was invoked during labor conflicts. Later in the 20th century, it was used to enforce federally mandated desegregation, with Presidents Dwight D. Eisenhower and John F. Kennedy invoking the Act in opposition to the affected states' political leaders to enforce court-ordered desegregation. Governors requested and received support following looting in the aftermath of Hurricane Hugo in 1989 and during the 1992 Los Angeles riots.

In 2005, the George W. Bush administration considered intervening in the state of Louisiana's response to Hurricane Katrina despite the refusal from Louisiana's governor, but this was inconsistent with past precedent, politically difficult, and potentially unconstitutional.

A provision of the John Warner National Defense Authorization Act for Fiscal Year 2007, added by an unidentified sponsor, amended the Insurrection Act to permit military intervention without state consent, in case of an emergency that hindered the enforcement of laws. President Bush signed this amendment into law, but some months after it was enacted, all fifty state governors issued a joint statement against it, and the changes were repealed in January 2008.

On June 1, 2020, President Donald Trump warned that he would invoke the Act in response to the George Floyd protests following the murder of George Floyd. In his official statement, Trump urged "every governor to deploy the National Guard in sufficient numbers" to re-establish civil law and order "until the violence has been quelled". Federal officials talked Trump out of invoking the Insurrection Act. The National Guard was called during the January 6 United States Capitol attack, but the Insurrection Act was not invoked.

On January 20, 2025, President Trump signed an executive order requiring the Secretary of Defense and the Secretary of Homeland Security to, within 90 days, submit to the president a joint report "about the conditions at the southern border of the United States and any recommendations regarding additional actions that may be necessary to obtain complete operational control of the southern border, including whether to invoke the Insurrection Act of 1807". On April 18th, the report ultimately recommended against invocation.

In June 2025, in light of the anti-deportation protests in Los Angeles, Trump considered invoking the Insurrection Act to use the armed forces to suppress the demonstrations.

In early October 2025, Trump again floated the possibility of invoking the act in other Democratic-led cities/states like Portland, Oregon and Chicago, Illinois, even as their respective mayors and governors strongly opposed the idea.

In January 2026, Trump again threatened to use the Insurrection Act after his deployment of 3,000 ICE agents to the state of Minnesota, following the shooting death of Renée Good by ICE agent Jonathan Ross, which led to significant protests.

== Calls for reform ==
In 2020, Senator Richard Blumenthal introduced the CIVIL Act (Curtailing Insurrection and Violations of Individuals' Liberties Act) to restrict presidential authorities outlined in the Insurrection Act. The legislation sought to require the President to consult with Congress before invoking the Act, restricting the President's activation of troops under the Act to fourteen days without explicit congressional authorization, requiring the President, Secretary of Defense, and Attorney General to issue a joint certification to Congress affirming a state's reluctance or inability to enforce the laws, thus justifying the use of the military, and prohibiting active duty troops from performing law enforcement actions unless authorized by law.

In 2022, the Brennan Center for Justice submitted a proposal to the January 6 house committee, which investigated the January 6 United States Capitol attack, to reform the Insurrection Act with the intent of clarifying vague language and updating its contents to reflect issues of the present. Some of the language the BCJ identified as needing clarification includes the section outlining the circumstances in which the President can invoke the Act that reads "any insurrection, domestic violence, unlawful combination, or conspiracy" are legally accepted criteria for the law's invocation.

The BCJ argues that this criterion is broad and can possibly be interpreted to allow the President to invoke the Act to address any conspiracy, large or small, to include protests or petty criminal acts with active duty military forces. The BCJ also argued for Congress to rewrite the line "The President, by using the militia or the armed forces, or both, or by any other means," as the inclusion of by any other means can leave open the possibility of a force not formally under the control of the Department of Defense being authorized by the President to act under the auspices of the Insurrection Act.

== See also ==
- Martial law in the United States
- List of national emergencies in the United States
- Martin v. Mott (1827)
- List of invocations of the Insurrection Act
- District of Columbia Home Rule Act § Emergency takeover of police
- Similar provisions in other federations:
  - Section 119 of the Constitution of Australia
  - Emergencies Act (Canada)
  - Forty-fourth Amendment of the Constitution of India
