= Section 119 of the Constitution of Australia =

Australian constitutional law

Section 119 of the Constitution of Australia requires the federal government to protect the states against invasion and, on the application of state governments, against domestic civil unrest.

== Text ==
The Commonwealth shall protect every State against invasion and, on the application of the Executive Government of the State, against domestic violence.

== Drafting ==
Section 119 was derived from the Guarantee Clause of Article Four of the United States Constitution, which similarly provides for the federal government to protect the states against invasion and "domestic violence". The need for section 119 has been linked with the existence of section 114, which prohibits the states from raising a military force themselves.

== Interpretation ==
The first limb of section 119 has been described as conferring a positive duty on the federal government to protect the states from invasion. The second limb provides for military aid to the civil power and has been interpreted as "a federal constraint on the power of the Commonwealth to call out the military domestically". The term "domestic violence" in the second limb is not defined but has been taken to refer to "local uprisings, insurrections or internal unrest within a state".

Section 119 appears not to allow for unilateral intervention by the federal government, but in reality the military has been called out on a number of occasions using other heads of power in the constitution, notably the "defence power" in section 51(vi) and the "nationhood power" in section 61. Quick and Garran's annotated constitution notes that if "domestic violence within a State is of such a character as to interfere with the operations of the Federal Government, or with the rights and privileges of federal citizenship, the Federal Government may clearly, without a summons from the State, interfere to restore order". A 1998 paper on the subject concluded that "the mechanism provided for in Section 119 of the Constitution has been of little practical importance".

== Invocations ==
Section 119 is referenced in the provisions of the Defence Act 1903 relating to the circumstances in which the federal government may call out the Australian Defence Force. The act states that references to "domestic violence" in the act shall have the same meaning as in section 119.

The second limb of section 119 has only been invoked by state governments on a handful of occasions, which occurred during the 1910s and 1920s. The first formal request made by a state government under section 119 was in 1912, when Queensland premier Digby Denham requested federal assistance to deal with the 1912 Brisbane general strike. Andrew Fisher's government refused the request on the grounds that it was "under circumstances which are proper to be dealt with by the Police Forces of the States". In 1919, New South Wales premier William Holman cabled acting prime minister William Watt to request assistance against "the danger of quarantined soldiers escaping their confinement and then being liable to arrest by local police". The situation was resolved by the military internally. A 1971 review of the Commonwealth Archives Office found five further instances in which state governments had requested that the military be deployed to quell civil unrest, although no formal reference was made to section 119. In each instance the request was refused by the federal government.

Requests for federal intervention under section 119
Year	State	Premier	Prime Minister	Rationale	Status
1912	Queensland	Digby Denham	Andrew Fisher	1912 Brisbane general strike	Refused
1916	Tasmania	Walter Lee	Billy Hughes	1916 conscription referendum	Refused
1919	New South Wales	William Holman	William Watt (acting)	Unrest among quarantined soldiers	Accepted
1919	Western Australia	Hal Colebatch	William Watt (acting)	1919 Fremantle Wharf riot	Refused
1921	Western Australia	James Mitchell	Joseph Cook (acting)	Industrial conflict	Refused
1923	Victoria	Harry Lawson	S. M. Bruce	1923 Victorian police strike	Refused
1928	South Australia	Richard Butler	S. M. Bruce	Industrial conflict	Refused

== See also ==
- List of invocations of the Insurrection Act, similar provision in the United States
