= National Defense Authorization Act for Fiscal Year 2007 =

John Warner National Defense Authorization Act for Fiscal Year 2007
- Long title: An Act to authorize appropriations for fiscal year 2007 for military activities of the Department of Defense, for military construction, and for defense activities of the Department of Energy, to prescribe military personnel strengths for such fiscal year, and for other purposes.
- Enacted by: the 109th United States Congress

Citations
- Public law: Pub. L. 109–364 (text) (PDF)
- Statutes at Large: 120 Stat. 2083 through 120 Stat. 2521

Legislative history
- Introduced in the House as National Defense Authorization Act for Fiscal Year 2007 (H.R. 5122) by Duncan Hunter (R–CA) on April 4, 2006; Committee consideration by House Armed Services Committee; Passed the House on May 11, 2006 (396–31); Passed the Senate as the John Warner National Defense Authorization Act for Fiscal Year 2007 on June 22, 2006; Reported by the joint conference committee on September 12, 2006; agreed to by the House on September 29, 2006 (398–23) and by the Senate on September 30, 2006; Signed into law by President George W. Bush on October 17, 2006

H.R. 5122, also known as the John Warner National Defense Authorization Act for Fiscal Year 2007, was a bill passed in the United States Congress on September 29, 2006 and signed by United States President George W. Bush on October 17, 2006, becoming Public Law 109–364. The House vote was 396 ayes (227 Republicans, 168 Democrats, 1 independent) with 31 nays and 5 present not voting; the Senate vote was 96 ayes (53 Republicans and 42 Democrats), with 0 nays and 4 not voting (2 Republicans and 2 Democrats). H.R. 5122 includes:

- $10,876,609,000 allocated to the U.S. Army
- $17,383,857,000 allocated to the U.S. Navy
- $24,235,951,000 allocated to the U.S. Air Force
- $21,111,559,000 allocated to Defense-wide activities ($181,520,000 of this amount "is authorized for the Director of Operational Test and Evaluation.")
- Expansion of the President's power to declare martial law under revisions to the Insurrection Act, and take charge of United States National Guard troops without state governor authorization when public order has been lost and the state and its constituted authorities cannot enforce the law (amended in 2008 by H.R.4986 SEC.1068);
- The elimination of the position of the Special Inspector General for Iraq Reconstruction as of October 1, 2007, currently held by Republican lawyer Stuart Bowen, which is in charge of auditing expenditures in Iraq, transitioning Inspector General responsibilities to the Inspector General offices in the departments of State and Defense, now that the Coalition Provisional Authority is dissolved and Iraq is now a sovereign nation.
- A sunset date of September 30, 2012, which was later repealed.

It was named for Senator John Warner of Virginia.

== Amendment to Section 1076 of the law ==
In 2008, the National Defense Authorization Act for Fiscal Year 2008 struck much of the existing text in section 1076. The revised section of the law, section 1068 had one amended section had multiple parts with the same exact text. These sections (as amended, and bolded to show the similar parts) read as follows:

`Sec. 333. Interference with State and Federal law
`The President, by using the militia or the armed forces, or both, or by any other means, shall take such measures as he considers necessary to suppress, in a State, any insurrection, domestic violence, unlawful combination, or conspiracy, if it--
`(1) so hinders the execution of the laws of that State, and of the United States within the State, that any part or class of its people is deprived of a right, privilege, immunity, or protection named in the Constitution and secured by law, and the constituted authorities of that State are unable, fail, or refuse to protect that right, privilege, or immunity, or to give that protection; or
`(2) opposes or obstructs the execution of the laws of the United States or impedes the course of justice under those laws.
In any situation covered by clause (1), the State shall be considered to have denied the equal protection of the laws secured by the Constitution.'.

These all were later amended in the National Defense Authorization Act for Fiscal Year 2017, reinstating the presidential powers as were found in the National Defense Authorization Act for Fiscal Year 2007
