= List of invocations of the Insurrection Act =

This is a list of invocations of the Insurrection Act of 1807.

The act has been invoked by fifteen Presidents and illegally by one Army general, in response to 30 incidents. Its latest invocation was during the 1992 Los Angeles riots.

== List ==
Date invoked	Invoker	Cause	Results
April 19, 1808	Thomas Jefferson	Violations of the Embargo Act of 1807 around Lake Champlain.	Violations continued, act repealed in 1809.
February 10, 1831	Andrew Jackson	Dispute around Arkansas-Mexico border.	Resolved before troops sent.
August 24, 1831	Andrew Jackson	Nat Turner's Rebellion in Southampton County, Virginia.	Rebellion suppressed.
January 28, 1834	Andrew Jackson	Riot over labor dispute in Maryland.	Resolved before troops sent.
April 15, 1861	Abraham Lincoln	Secession of southern states, American Civil War.	Civil war ends after four years. Beginning of Reconstruction era.
October 17, 1871	Ulysses S. Grant	Insurgency across former Confederacy.	Insurgency suppressed.
May 22, 1873	Ulysses S. Grant	Violence in Louisiana after contested election.	Resolved before troops sent.
May 15, 1874	Ulysses S. Grant	Brooks–Baxter War in Arkansas.	Resolved before troops sent.
September 15, 1874	Ulysses S. Grant	Battle of Liberty Place in Louisiana.	New Orleans and state government liberated, insurgency continued in other areas until 1877.
December 21, 1874	Ulysses S. Grant	Insurrection and massacre in Vicksburg.	Insurrection suppressed.
October 17, 1876	Ulysses S. Grant	Paramilitaries in South Carolina.	Paramilitaries dispersed, troops stay until 1877.
July 18, 1877	Rutherford B. Hayes	Railroad strike in multiple states.	Strike suppressed. Eventual reform.
October 7, 1878	Rutherford B. Hayes	War between rival business/gang factions in Lincoln County, New Mexico.	Most fighting stops.
May 3, 1882	Chester A. Arthur	Gang violence in the Arizona Territory.	Gangs suppressed.
November 7, 1885	Grover Cleveland	Tacoma riot of 1885 against Chinese citizens in the Washington Territory.	Riot suppressed.
February 9, 1886	Grover Cleveland	Seattle riot of 1886 against Chinese citizens in the Washington Territory.	Riot suppressed.
July 8, 1894	Grover Cleveland	Pullman Strike in multiple states.	Strike suppressed. Eventual reform.
April 28, 1914	Woodrow Wilson	Strike and uprising in Colorado.	Strike and uprising suppressed. Eventual reform.
August 30, 1921	Warren G. Harding	Strike and uprising in West Virginia.	Strike and uprising suppressed. Eventual reform.
July 28, 1932	Douglas MacArthur	Army general illegally invokes act against WWI veterans marching for military bonuses in Washington, D.C.	Protest suppressed.
June 21, 1943	Franklin D. Roosevelt	Race riot in Detroit.	Riot suppressed.
September 23, 1957	Dwight D. Eisenhower	Arkansas National Guard forbids black students from a school in Little Rock.	Arkansas National Guard federalized and ordered to stand down. Federal troops escort black students to school.
September 30, 1962	John F. Kennedy	Siege and riot of University of Mississippi due to racial integration.	Riot suppressed.
June 11, 1963	John F. Kennedy	Governor of Alabama forbids black students from a school in Tuscaloosa.	Alabama National Guard federalized and ordered to stand down. Federal troops escort black students to school.
September 10, 1963	John F. Kennedy	Alabama National Guard forbids black students from all-white schools.	Alabama National Guard federalized and ordered to stand down.
March 20, 1965	Lyndon B. Johnson	Alabamian policemen suppress first Selma to Montgomery marches.	Federalization of Alabama National Guard before the third march.
July 24, 1967	Lyndon B. Johnson	Protests and riots in Detroit.	Riots suppressed.
April 5, 1968	Lyndon B. Johnson	Riots and civil unrest in multiple states after the assassination of Martin Luther King, Jr..	Riots suppressed.
November 24, 1987	Ronald Reagan	Prison riot in Atlanta over announced deportations of Cuban detainees.	Riot suppressed.
September 20, 1989	George H. W. Bush	Looting in the United States Virgin Islands after Hurricane Hugo.	Order restored.
May 1, 1992	George H. W. Bush	Riots in Los Angeles after the acquittal of policemen who beat Rodney King.	Riot suppressed.

== See also ==
- Section 119 of the Constitution of Australia#Invocations
