= Posse Comitatus Act =

United States law limiting use of the federal military in law enforcement

- Other short titles: Knott Amendment; Posse Comitatus Act of 1878
- Long title: An act making appropriations for the support of the Army for the fiscal year ending June thirtieth, eighteen hundred and seventy-nine, and for other purposes.
- Nicknames: Army Appropriations Act of 1878
- Enacted by: the 45th United States Congress
- Effective: June 18, 1878

Citations
- Public law: Pub. L. 45–263
- Statutes at Large: 20 Stat. 145 a.k.a. 20 Stat. 152

Codification
- U.S.C. sections created: 18 U.S.C. § 1385

Legislative history
- Introduced in the House as H.R. 4867 by Herman L. Humphrey (R-WI), William Kimmel (D-MD) on May 13, 1878; Passed the House on May 18, 1878 (130–117); Passed the Senate on June 6, 1878 (36–23); Reported by the joint conference committee on June 15, 1878; agreed to by the House on June 15, 1878 (154–58) and by the Senate on June 15, 1878 (Agreed); Signed into law by President Rutherford B. Hayes on June 18, 1878

Major amendments
- 1956, 1981, 2021

The Posse Comitatus Act is a United States federal law (18 U.S.C. § 1385, original at 20 Stat. 152 signed into law on June 18, 1878, by President Rutherford B. Hayes) which makes it a felony for any person to use the federal military to enforce federal law unless authorized to do so by law. Congress passed the act as an amendment to an army appropriations bill following the end of Reconstruction and updated it in 1956, 1981 and 2021.

The act originally applied only to the United States Army, but a subsequent amendment in 1956 expanded its scope to the United States Air Force. In 2021, the National Defense Authorization Act for Fiscal Year 2022 further expanded the scope of the act to cover the United States Navy, Marine Corps, and Space Force. The act does not prevent the Army National Guard or the Air National Guard under state authority from acting in a law enforcement capacity within its home state or in an adjacent state if invited by that state's governor. The United States Coast Guard (under the Department of Homeland Security) is not covered by the act either, primarily because, although it is an armed service, it also has a maritime law enforcement mission.

The title of the act comes from the legal concept of posse comitatus, the common law authority under which a state official can conscript any able-bodied person or group to assist in keeping the peace and enforce the state's laws.

== History ==
The act, section 15 of the appropriations bill for the Army for 1879 (found at 20 Stat. 152) was a response to, and subsequent prohibition of, the military occupation of the former Confederate States by the United States Army during the twelve years of Reconstruction (1865–1877) following the American Civil War (1861–1865).

The U.S. Constitution places primary responsibility for the holding of elections in the hands of the individual states. The maintenance of peace, conduct of orderly elections, and prosecution of unlawful actions, are all state responsibilities according to any state's role of exercising police power and maintaining law and order, whether part of a wider federation or as a unitary state. However, in the former Confederate States, many paramilitary groups sought to suppress, often through intimidation and violence, African-American political power and return the South to rule by the predominantly white Democratic Party. Although African Americans were initially supported by the federal government, as Reconstruction went on, that support waned. Following the bitterly disputed 1876 U.S. presidential election and Compromise of 1877, Congressmen and Senators from the former Confederate States returned to Washington and prioritized prohibiting the federal government from reimposing control over their states. After President Hayes used federal troops to end the Great Railroad Strike of 1877, there was sufficient bipartisan support to pass what became the Posse Comitatus Act.

The original Posse Comitatus Act referred exclusively to the United States Army. The Air Force, established during the 20th century initially as a branch of the Army, was added in 1956. The Navy and Marine Corps were not mentioned in the act but were subject to the same restrictions by Department of Defense regulation until their inclusion in the act in 2021. The Space Force, established in 2020, was also included in the act in 2021. The United States Coast Guard is not included in the act even though it is part of the six armed services as it is explicitly given federal law enforcement authority on maritime law. The modern Coast Guard did not exist at the time the act became law in 1878. Its predecessor, the United States Revenue Cutter Service, was primarily a customs enforcement agency and part of the United States Department of the Treasury. In 1915, when the Revenue Cutter Service and the United States Lifesaving Service were amalgamated to form the Coast Guard, the service was both made a military branch and given federal law enforcement authority.

In the mid-20th century, the administration of President Dwight D. Eisenhower used an exception to the Posse Comitatus Act, derived from the Enforcement Acts, to send federal troops into Little Rock, Arkansas, during the 1957 school desegregation crisis. The Arkansas governor had opposed desegregation after the United States Supreme Court ruled in 1954 in Brown v. Board of Education that segregated public schools were unconstitutional. The Enforcement Acts, among other powers, allowed the president to call up military forces when state authorities were either unable or unwilling to suppress violence that was in opposition to the citizens' constitutional rights.

In the summer of 2020, the George Floyd protests in Washington, D.C., generated controversy when National Guard troops were called in to suppress protests without President Donald Trump's invoking the Insurrection Act. One set of troops, the District of Columbia National Guard, has historically operated as the equivalent of a state militia (under Title 32 of the United States Code) not subject to Posse Comitatus Act restrictions, even though it is a federal entity under the command of the President and the Secretary of the Army. National Guard troops from cooperative states were also called in at the request of federal agencies, some of whom were deputized as police. Attorney General William Barr cited 32 U.S.C. § 502(f)(2)(a), which says National Guard troops may engage in "support of operations or missions undertaken by the member's unit at the request of the President or Secretary of Defense." Saying the intent of §502 (titled "Required drills and field exercises") was to cover training exercises only, Senator Tom Udall and U.S. representative Jim McGovern described this as a "loophole" to circumvent Posse Comitatus Act restrictions, and introduced legislation to close it.

In 2020, U.S. representative Adam Schiff introduced an amendment to the act to expand its coverage to include the U.S. Navy, Marine Corps, and Space Force. This amendment was eventually included in the 2022 National Defense Authorization Act.

The 2025 lawsuit Newsom v. Trump raised constitutional and statutory challenges under the Posse Comitatus Act in response to the domestic deployment of U.S. Marines and National Guard troops in California. On September 2, 2025, federal judge Charles Breyer ruled that the federal deployment of the National Guard in California violated the Posse Comitatus Act and issued an injunction against it.

== Legislation ==
The original provision of 1878 was enacted as Section 15 of chapter 263, of the acts of the 2nd session of the 45th Congress.

Sec. 15. From and after the passage of this act it shall not be lawful to employ any part of the Army of the United States, as a posse comitatus, or otherwise, for the purpose of executing the laws, except in such cases and under such circumstances as such employment of said force may be expressly authorized by the Constitution or by act of Congress; and no money appropriated by this act shall be used to pay any of the expenses incurred in the employment of any troops in violation of this section and any person willfully violating the provisions of this section shall be deemed guilty of a misdemeanor and on conviction thereof shall be punished by fine not exceeding ten thousand dollars or imprisonment not exceeding two years or by both such fine and imprisonment.

The text of the relevant legislation following its amendment in 2021 is as follows:

18 U.S.C. § 1385. Use of Army, Navy, Marine Corps, Air Force, and Space Force as posse comitatus: Whoever, except in cases and under circumstances expressly authorized by the Constitution or Act of Congress, willfully uses any part of the Army, the Navy, the Marine Corps, the Air Force, or the Space Force as a posse comitatus or otherwise to execute the laws shall be fined under this title or imprisoned not more than two years, or both.

Also notable is the following provision within Title 10 of the United States Code (which concerns generally the organization and regulation of the armed forces and Department of Defense):

10 U.S.C. § 275. Restriction on direct participation by military personnel The Secretary of Defense shall prescribe such regulations as may be necessary to ensure that any activity (including the provision of any equipment or facility or the assignment or detail of any personnel) under this chapter does not include or permit direct participation by a member of the Army, Navy, Air Force, or Marine Corps in a search, seizure, arrest, or other similar activity unless participation in such activity by such member is otherwise authorized by law.

=== 2006–2007 suspension ===
In 2006, Congress modified the Insurrection Act as part of the 2007 Defense Authorization Bill (repealed as of 2008). On September 26, 2006, President George W. Bush urged Congress to consider revising federal laws so that U.S. armed forces could restore public order and enforce laws in the aftermath of a natural disaster, terrorist attack or incident, or other condition. These changes were included in the John Warner National Defense Authorization Act for Fiscal Year 2007 (H.R. 5122), which was signed into law on October 17, 2006.

Section 1076 is titled "Use of the Armed Forces in major public emergencies". It provided that:

The President may employ the armed forces ... to ... restore public order and enforce the laws of the United States when, as a result of a natural disaster, epidemic, or other serious public health emergency, terrorist attack or incident, or other condition ... the President determines that ... domestic violence has occurred to such an extent that the constituted authorities of the State or possession are incapable of maintaining public order ... or [to] suppress, in a State, any insurrection, domestic violence, unlawful combination, or conspiracy if such ... a condition ... so hinders the execution of the laws ... that any part or class of its people is deprived of a right, privilege, immunity, or protection named in the Constitution and secured by law ... or opposes or obstructs the execution of the laws of the United States or impedes the course of justice under those laws.

In 2008, these changes in the Insurrection Act of 1807 were repealed in their entirety, reverting to the previous wording of the Insurrection Act. It was initially written to limit presidential power as much as possible in the event of insurrection, rebellion, or lawlessness.

== Exceptions, exclusions, and limitations ==
There are several situations in which the act does not apply. These include:

- General criminal and criminal counterintelligence investigations when there is a relationship to a particular military branch conducted by civilian agents of certain independent military investigative agencies, such as: Air Force Office of Special Investigations (OSI), Naval Criminal Investigative Service (NCIS), United States Army Criminal Investigation Division (CID), and United States Army Counterintelligence Command (ACIC). The Posse Comitatus Act (PCA) specifically states, "except in cases and under circumstances expressly authorized by the Constitution or Act of Congress" with the following Acts of Congress providing specific statutory law enforcement authorities to include:
  - Under 10 U.S.C. § 7377, civilian Special Agents of ACIC and CID can execute and serve arrest and search warrants and likewise pertains to investigative activities associated with those authorities; however, unlike CID which is under a civilian director, ACIC agents remain under the control of a military commander.
  - Under 10 U.S.C. § 8750, civilian Special Agents of NCIS can execute and serve arrest and search warrants and likewise pertains to investigative activities associated with those authorities.
  - Under 10 U.S.C. § 9377, civilian Special Agents of OSI can execute and serve arrest and search warrants and likewise pertains to investigative activities associated with those authorities.
- Title 32 establishes and affirms that National Guard units are controlled by their respective state governors by default. While the Guard remains under state command, the Posse Comitatus Act does not apply. However, under 10 U.S.C. § 12406, the President may place a state’s National Guard under federal command if (1) the United States is invaded, (2) there is a rebellion or danger of rebellion against federal authority, or (3) the President is unable to enforce federal law with existing forces. Once federalized under Title 10, National Guard personnel are treated as active-duty military and become subject to the Posse Comitatus Act. Separately, under 32 U.S.C. § 502(f), the President or Secretary of Defense can request that a state governor issue orders for members of that state’s National Guard to perform duties, including law enforcement functions. However, in this case, the National Guard remains under the control of the governor and the governor retains legal authority to refuse the request. Because the Guard remains under state command in Title 32 status, the Posse Comitatus Act does not apply.
- Federal troops used in accordance to the Insurrection Act, which has been invoked 23 times, as of 1992.
- Under 18 U.S.C. § 831, the Attorney General may request that the Secretary of Defense provide emergency assistance if domestic law enforcement is inadequate to address specific types of threats involving the release of nuclear materials, such as potential use of a nuclear or radiological weapon. Such assistance may be by any personnel under the authority of the Department of Defense, provided such assistance does not adversely affect U.S. military preparedness. The only exemption is the deployment of nuclear materials on the part of the United States Armed Forces.
- Under 10 U.S.C. § 282, the Attorney General may request assistance from the military in enforcement of laws regarding biological, chemical, or other weapons of mass destruction (18 U.S.C. § 175a, § 229E, and § 2332e).
- Under 18 U.S.C. § 112, § 1116, and § 1201, the Attorney General may request that any other federal, state, or local agency, including the military, assist in the enforcement of laws protecting foreign diplomats and their families.
- Under 10 U.S.C. § 283, the military may assist in responding to terrorist bombings, particularly in terms of explosive ordnance disposal.
- Under 10 U.S.C. § 284, the military may provide surveillance, intelligence gathering, observation, and equipment for domestic law enforcement on operations such as drug interdiction and counter-terrorism missions. For example, Delta Force soldiers from Fort Bragg were deployed upon request by the Federal Bureau of Investigation to serve as sniper/observer teams, run communications, provide medical support, gather intelligence, and conduct assistance in explosive breaching during the 1987 Atlanta prison riots.

=== Exclusion applicable to U.S. Coast Guard ===
Although it is an armed service, the U.S. Coast Guard, which operates under the United States Department of Homeland Security during peacetime, is not restricted by the Posse Comitatus Act and has explicit authority to enforce federal law. This is true even when the Coast Guard operates as a service within the United States Navy during wartime.

In December 1981, the Military Cooperation with Civilian Law Enforcement Agencies Act was enacted, clarifying permissible military assistance to domestic law enforcement agencies and the Coast Guard, especially in combating drug smuggling into the United States. Posse Comitatus clarifications emphasize supportive and technical assistance (such as the use of facilities, vessels, and aircraft, as well as intelligence support, technological aid, and surveillance) while generally prohibiting direct participation of U.S. military personnel in law enforcement (such as search, seizure, and arrests). For example, a U.S. Navy vessel may be used to track, follow, and stop a vessel suspected of drug smuggling, but Coast Guard Law Enforcement Detachments (LEDETs) embarked aboard the Navy vessel would perform the actual boarding and, if needed, arrest the suspect vessel's crew.

=== Advisory and support roles ===
Federal troops have a long history of domestic roles, including occupying secessionist Southern states during Reconstruction and putting down major urban riots. The Posse Comitatus Act prohibits using active duty personnel to "execute the laws"; however, there is disagreement over whether this language may apply to troops used in an advisory, support, disaster response, or other homeland defense role, as opposed to domestic law enforcement.

On March 10, 2009, members of the U.S. Army Military Police Corps from Fort Rucker were deployed to Samson, Alabama, in response to a shooting spree. Samson officials confirmed that the soldiers assisted in traffic control and securing the crime scene. The governor of Alabama did not request military assistance, nor did President Barack Obama authorize their deployment. Subsequent investigation found that the Posse Comitatus Act was violated and several military members received "administrative actions".

== See also ==
- List of military actions by or within the United States
- Crossing the Rubicon
- Martial law
- Militarization of police
- Separation of military and police roles
- United States Northern Command
