= Domestic policy of the second Trump administration =

This article encompasses the domestic policy of Donald Trump as the 47th president of the United States.

== Background ==
Prospective policies for Trump's second presidency were proposed in Agenda 47, a collection of his formal policy plans.

== Agriculture ==
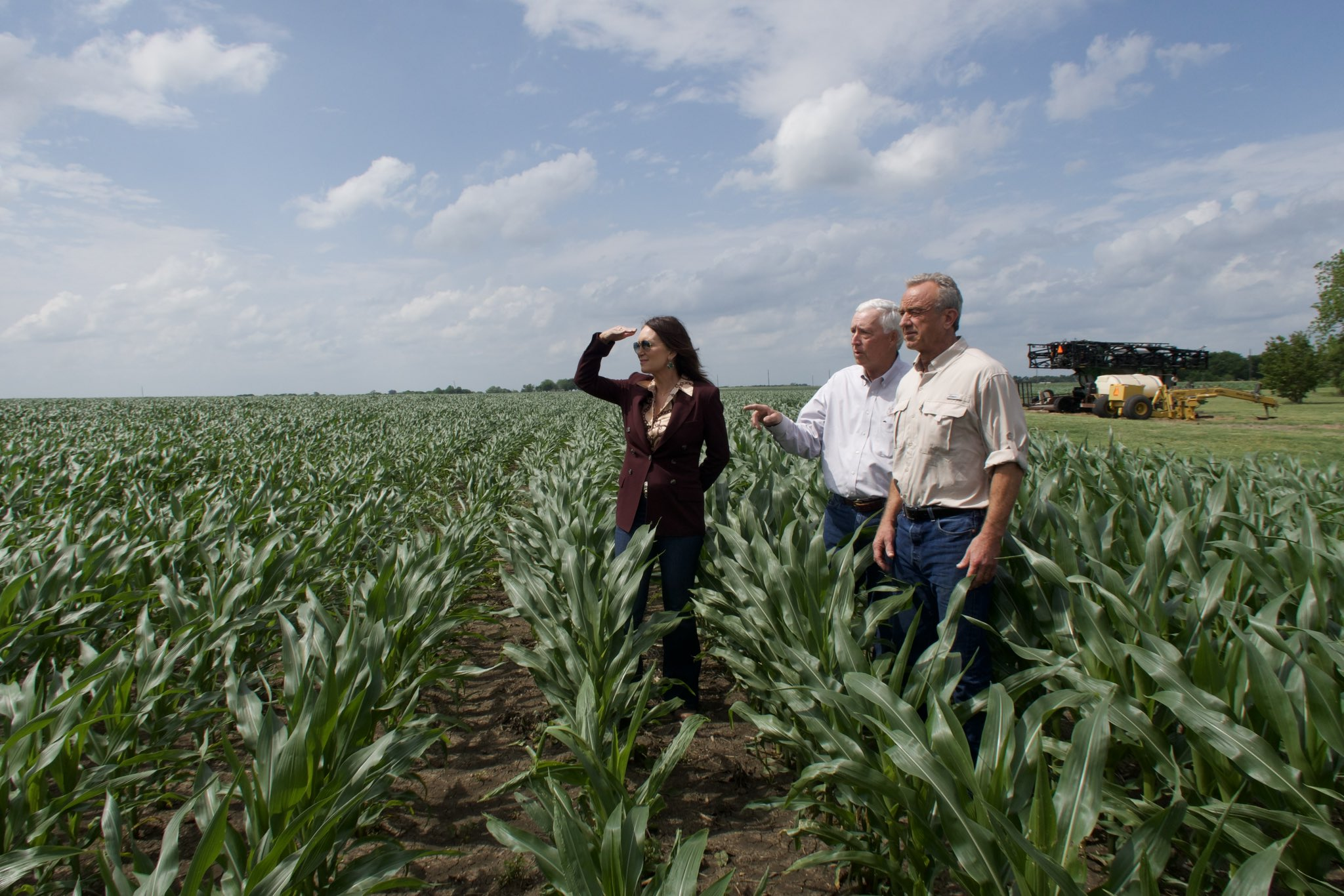
Brooke Rollins and RFK Jr. in a field

== Artificial Intelligence ==
As AI software began to mature across various domains in the 2020s, the second Trump administration has repeatedly called for backing AI as both a priority from a economic standpoint and for national security. The administration often framed the issue with "staying ahead of China on AI" as part of a broader narrative around avoiding decline in a time of increasing authoritarianism abroad and growing sentiment of nativism at home. Polls surrounding AI have been mixed, data centers being the flashpoint issue within the broader discussion. With data centers, the concerns are broad and include environmental destruction, groundwater contamination and increased noise pollution in adjacent residential areas. The administration's energy policy and environmental policies have been predominantly pro business and therefore pro-AI. In the environmental domain, the administration has reduced inspections, regulations, and have slashed approval times in order to spur as much data center construction as possible. With Moore's Law at play on the computing side of the issue, AI industry backers say the infrastructure must be built domestically to prevent data security and blackout issues. The administration has shown a greater level of integration with the industry, often blurring the line and releasing websites featuring a heavy amount of AI chatbot use.

== Criminal justice and law enforcement ==
Trump entered office following 2024's 50-year record-low level of violent crime. The Associated Press reported that despite historic drops in crime, many voters felt unsafe due to "misleading campaign rhetoric". Upon taking office, Trump signed Executive Order 14164 promoting capital punishment; the order instructed the Justice Department to resume and pursue executions at the federal level, to challenge Supreme Court precedent restricting the use of the death penalty, and to supply lethal injection drugs to states that retained the death penalty. As part of the Initial Rescissions of Harmful Executive Orders and Actions, Trump rescinded Executive Order 14006 (Reforming Our Incarceration System to Eliminate the Use of Privately Operated Criminal Detention Facilities). The Justice Department put a freeze on civil rights cases and signaled it would roll back consent agreements with police departments two days after Trump took office. The National Law Enforcement Accountability Database (which kept disciplinary records of federal law enforcement officers) was deactivated in January 2025; it was proposed by Trump in 2020 and created by Biden in 2023. Trump also eliminated the White House Office of Gun Violence Prevention, which had been created by the Biden administration and cut federal funding for gun violence prevention. Separately, Elon Musk's private bodyguards were assigned as special deputies by the United States Marshals Service in February 2025. In February 2025, the administration shut down Task Force KleptoCapture.

The United States Department of Justice Civil Rights Division moved to dismiss lawsuit against the Louisville and Minneapolis police departments. The division also worked to close investigations into, and retract findings of constitutional violations on the part of the police departments of Phoenix, Trenton, Memphis, Mount Vernon, Oklahoma City, and the Louisiana State Police.

The administration charged Mayor Ras Baraka and Representative LaMonica McIver over the Newark immigration detention center incident.

In July 2025, the DOJ sought a 1-day sentence for Brett Hankison.

In August 2025, Trump signed Executive Order 14342 which orders the Attorney General to submit a list of jurisdictions that have "eliminated cash bail as a potential condition of pretrial release from custody for crimes that pose a clear threat to public safety and order, including offenses involving violent, sexual, or indecent acts, or burglary, looting, or vandalism" and that the head of each executive department and agency, shall identify Federal funds provided to these jurisdictions that may be suspended or terminated. Executive Order 14339 orders the Secretary of Defense to ensure "each State's Army National Guard and Air National Guard are resourced, trained, organized, and available to assist Federal, State, and local law enforcement in quelling civil disturbances and ensuring the public safety and order" and "ensure the availability of a standing National Guard quick reaction force that shall be resourced, trained, and available for rapid nationwide deployment".

Speaking about the killing of Iryna Zarutska on September 8, 2025, Trump called the attacker "a madman" and "a lunatic". He continued by blaming local officials in places like Chicago for failing to stop crime and denounced cashless bail.

The Justice Department reportedly shut down an investigation into Tom Homan accepting $50,000.

The Federal Communications Commission raised that cap that inmates can be charged for phone calls and proposed empowering local and state correctional authorities to jam signals from contraband devices.

Following the killing of Alex Pretti, the Department of Homeland Security launched Operation Puppet Master and Project Whipple Shield, two surveillance operations targeting progressive organizations, labor unions, and other groups opposed to the Trump administration's immigration policy. Undercover agents infiltrated protest group chats and attempted to entice people into discussing or committing crimes. Agents also infiltrated community meetings held in churches, schools and parks and tracked license plate numbers to compile names of people who attended gatherings. Agents used facial recognition software Clearview AI to compile photo dossiers of activists. DHS agents also filed subpoenas to obtain the financial records of multiple organizations. Organizations targeted include the AFL-CIO, Sunrise Movement, Service Employees International Union, Minneapolis Federation of Educators, Minnesota Association of Professional Employees, Democratic Socialists of America, Showing Up for Racial Justice, Minnesota 50501, and Communications Workers of America. The New York Times noted that the operations were reminiscent of COINTELPRO.

The Justice Department lost thousands of lawyers including, according to Todd Blanche, all employees who investigated Donald Trump. The actions of the administration, described as a pattern of defiance of lower court orders, led judges to question the presumption of regularity. Through the shadow docket, the Roberts Court commonly removed lower court rulings against the administration. The Associated Press wrote that "Critics say those decisions are emboldening the administration to ignore judges' orders."

The Justice Department sought the death penalty against at least 42 defendants, more than in Trump's first term, and the army planned to conduct executions if Trump ordered such action.

=== Domestic military deployments ===
During his second presidency, Donald Trump ordered deployments of National Guard troops to select U.S. cities in 2025 and certain deployments have continued into 2026. Trump has given multiple explanations for the deployments, saying they are officially part of crackdowns on protests, civil unrest, crime, homelessness, and illegal immigration. The actions targeted Democratic Party-led cities and sparked significant controversy, with critics labeling them as abuses of power and potential violations of laws like the Posse Comitatus Act, which limits military involvement in domestic law enforcement. The moves came amidst broader expansions of the military's domestic use during the second Trump administration, and Trump's prior comments during his presidential campaign to use the military to end civil unrest and protests without consent from state governors and target "the enemy within".

Deployments began in Los Angeles in June 2025 and expanded to Washington, D.C., in August 2025, before presidential authorizations were issued to expand to Memphis, Tennessee, and Portland, Oregon, in September 2025. Federal forces arrived in Memphis in October 2025. Plans were underway for Chicago and potentially other cities like New York, Baltimore, San Francisco, and Oakland, California. In September 2025, Trump told military leaders to view the deployments as "training grounds for our military" and described America as under "invasion" and waging "a war from within". In October 2025, Trump authorized federal troop deployments in Chicago as part of Operation Midway Blitz, a multi-agency surge aimed at "criminal illegal aliens" in Illinois and moved on to New Orleans in December.

On September 2, 2025, a federal judge ruled that the administration had illegally sent troops into Los Angeles in violation of the Posse Comitatus Act, a development described as potentially complicating Trump's threats for further military deployment. Further court cases and appeals questioned the legality of the deployments, with the U.S. Supreme Court rejecting an administration emergency appeal of a lower court ruling blocking the National Guard deployment to Chicago. On December 31, Trump announced that the administration would be ending its efforts to deploy the National Guard to Los Angeles, Portland, and Chicago, while suggesting that future National Guard deployments in those cities were still possible. In January 2026, all troops deployed to Chicago, Portland, and Los Angeles were withdrawn, while the National Guard deployment to the District of Columbia was extended to the end of the year.

In the same month, the Congressional Budget Office estimated that the deployments to Los Angeles, Memphis, Portland, Chicago, and the District of Columbia cost $496 million from June through December 2025, and would cost $93 million per month if all five deployments and the deployment in New Orleans were continued in 2026 (which would amount to $1.1 billion in total if continued for the whole year). A minority staff report issued by the Senate Homeland Security Committee in February 2026 estimated that the deployment to the District of Columbia alone from August 2025 through the end of the month would cost $332 million (or $602 million on an annualized basis), which compared with a $599 million budget for the Metropolitan Police Department for fiscal year 2026. As noted by local elected and law enforcement officials, crime statistics from before the National Guard deployments showed falling violent crime and property crime rates in Portland, Los Angeles, Chicago, Memphis, New Orleans, and the District of Columbia.

=== Opioid epidemic ===
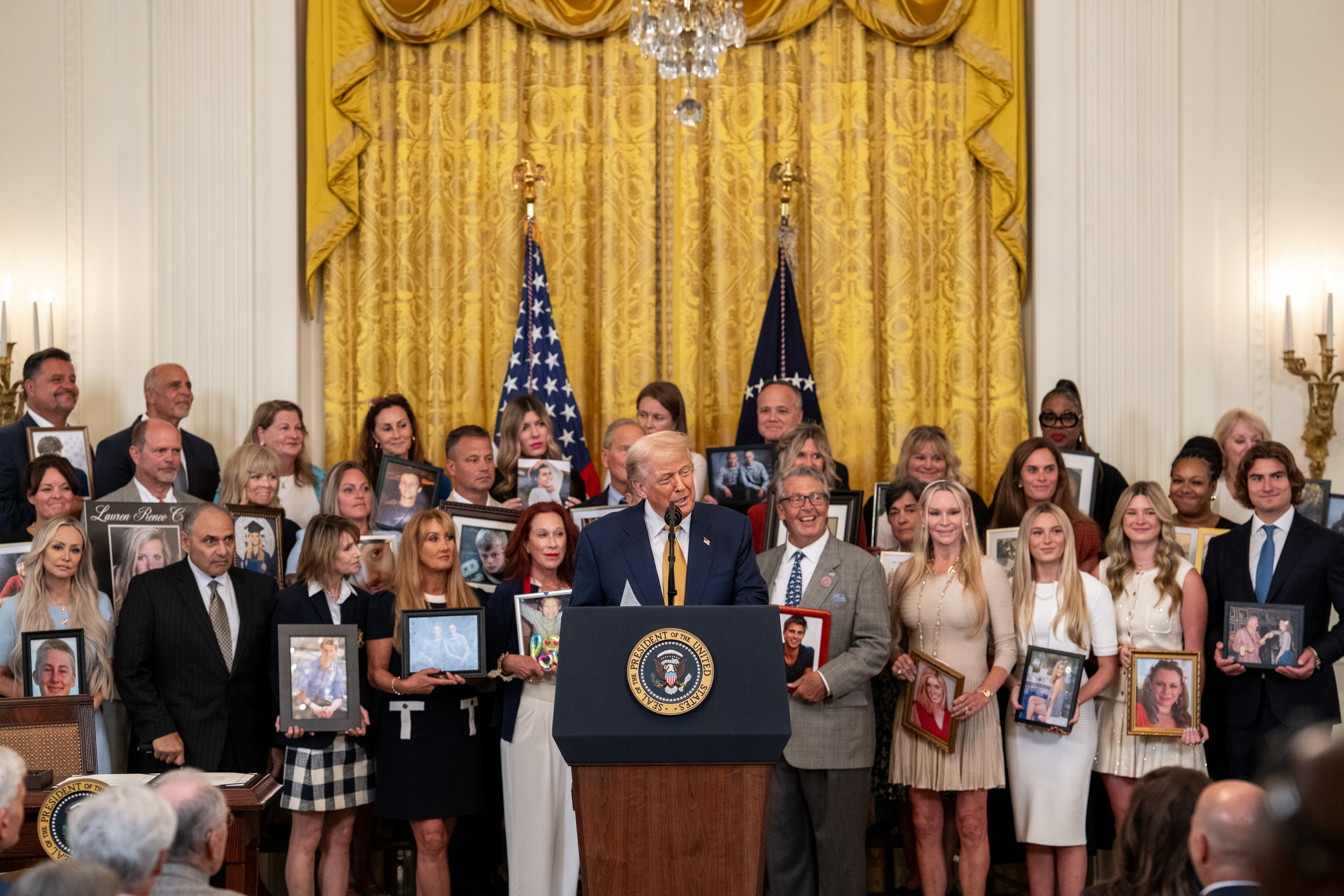
Trump at the signing ceremony of the HALT Fentanyl Act, July 16, 2025

On July 16, 2025, Trump officially signed the HALT Fentanyl Act, which will make it easier to prosecute and incarcerate fentanyl traffickers.

A Drug Enforcement Administration sweep in August 2025 arrested about 600 people nationally, including 171 in New England that the DEA claimed were "high-level" members of the Sinaloa Cartel without releasing any names or evidence. A Boston Globe Spotlight investigation could only find mention of the cartel in court documents for two arrestees, and found that most arrestees were drug users and not dealers. Some were immediately released with no charges filed. Several interviewed defendants said the government had never asked them about the Sinaloa Cartel and complained the public relations effort was putting them in danger by falsely associating them with it.

=== Presidential pardons and commutations ===
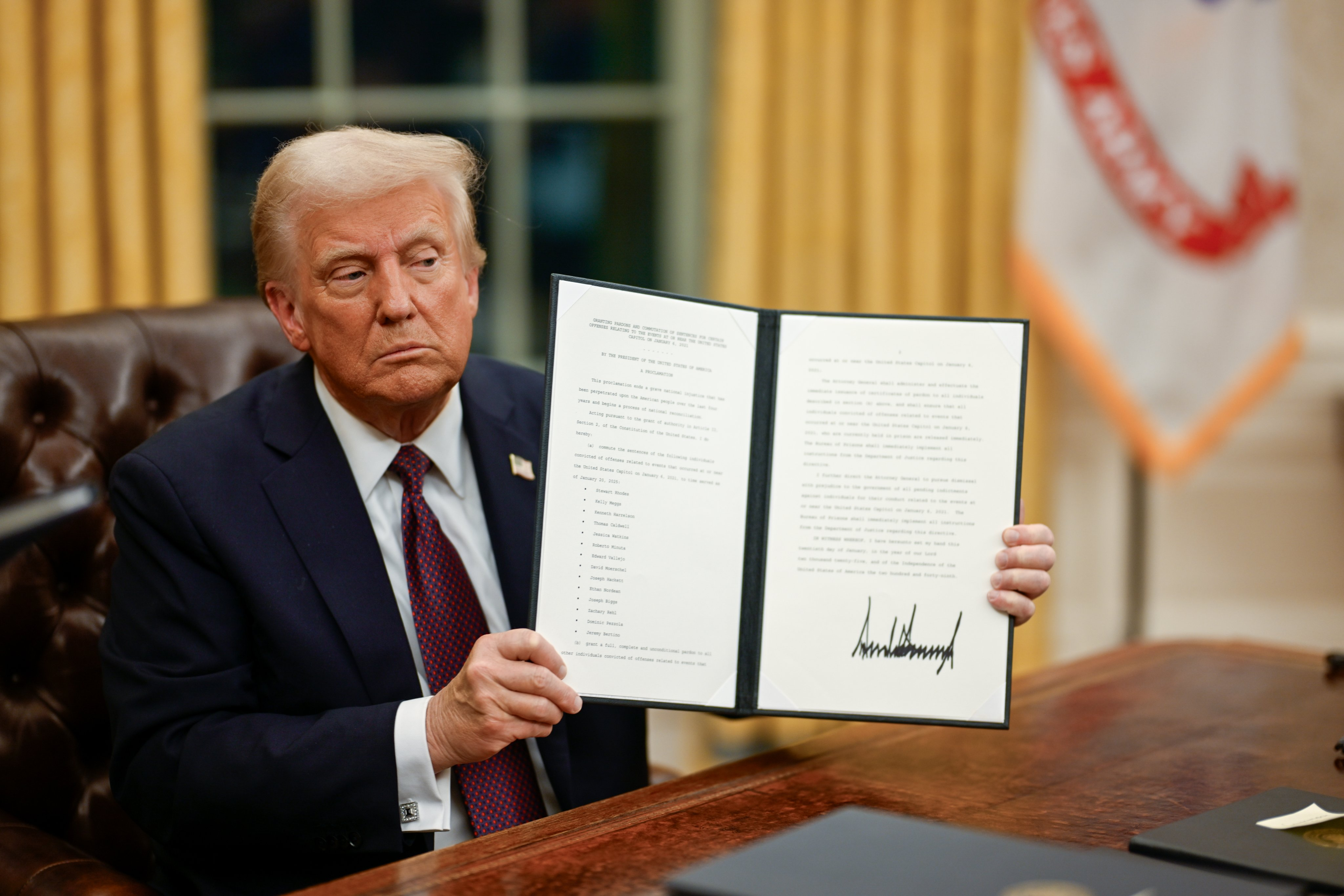
Trump pardoning about 1,500 people convicted of offenses related to the January 6 United States Capitol attack

In his role as the 47th president of the United States (January 20, 2025 – present), Donald Trump granted executive clemency to more than 1,700 individuals as of June 11, 2026, all of whom were charged or convicted of federal criminal offenses. This included a blanket pardon of some 1,500 individuals associated with the January 6 United States Capitol attack. Many of Trump's pardons have gone to people who committed fraud against the government or investors. In many cases, Trump also removed the requirement that these individuals pay restitution and fines, costing their victims an estimated $1.3 billion. At least three individuals who had been convicted in white-collar fraud cases and who were granted executive clemency also had their pending United States Securities and Exchange Commission civil enforcement actions dropped as a result. Unique among modern U.S. presidents, Trump also issued pardons to corporations, erasing $200 million in financial penalties lodged against those companies.

A June 2026 Reuters review of clemency decisions by the second Trump administration found that 96% of clemency grants failed to meet longstanding Department of Justice guidelines for such requests; a large number of pardons were granted to people who used Trump allies to lobby for their cause; and there was evidence of donations to Trump or payments to Trump allies to help achieve the clemency. The nature of the clemency process under the second Trump administration has been controversial among legal experts, ethics experts, and the victims of the pardoned offenders, and a claim many have been "quid pro quo".

=== Human trafficking ===
Federal initiatives for fighting human trafficking were drastically rolled back across a number of departments, according to an investigation by The Guardian. The State Department cut more than 70% of its human trafficking workforce. At the Department of Homeland Security, agents were shifted from focus on human trafficking to deporting immigrants. The administration delayed the release of its annual report on human trafficking. The Department of Justice cut funding for law enforcement investigations of sex crimes against children and canceled the 2025 National Law Enforcement Training on Child Exploitation. Meetings were halted which had been regularly held between Internet Crimes against Children taskforces, the National Center for Missing and Exploited Children, and tech companies.

== Demographics and discrimination ==
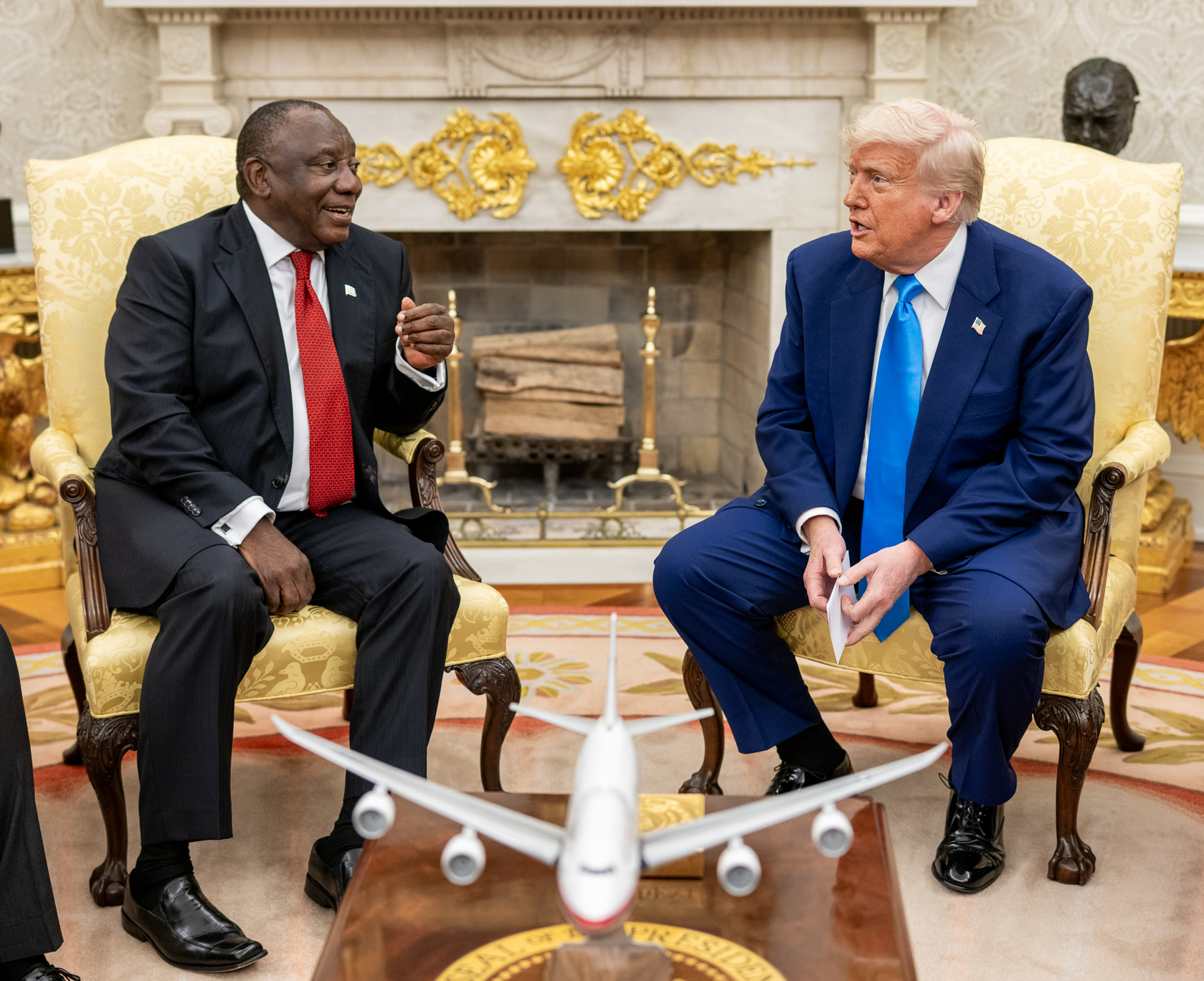
Trump meets with South African president Cyril Ramaphosa on May 21, 2025, during which he pointed to South African farm attacks and falsely claimed there was a white genocide in South Africa.

Trump attributed societal problems to diversity, equity, and inclusion and wokeness. Equating diversity with incompetence, he reversed pro-diversity policies in the federal government, and downsized divisions working on civil rights. He displayed hostility towards and rolled back enforcement of the Civil Rights Act of 1964 and reoriented civil rights protections and affirmative action to protect white men to combat alleged "anti-white racism", previously stating during his campaign that there was "a definite anti-white feeling in this country." He reoriented remaining civil rights divisions to target state and local officials, companies, and colleges for "illegal DEI", which became a buzzword in his administration. Trump's firings of senior military officers were disproportionately women, and as part of Trump's efforts to root out "DEI" initiatives in the federal government, agencies with the highest planned workforce reductions and dismissals were also those with the highest percentages of women, minority, and Black employees. His policies were described as politics of "white grievance" and resulting from backlash to the Black Lives Matter movement and George Floyd protests, and attempting to purge American culture of anything deemed "woke" or promoting diversity. His administration launched worldwide investigations into companies, cities, and institutions for alleged "DEI" programs. Based on claims of DEI overreach and Antisemitism, Trump threatened cultural institutions and sixty universities, and forced law firms to capitulate to his political agenda.

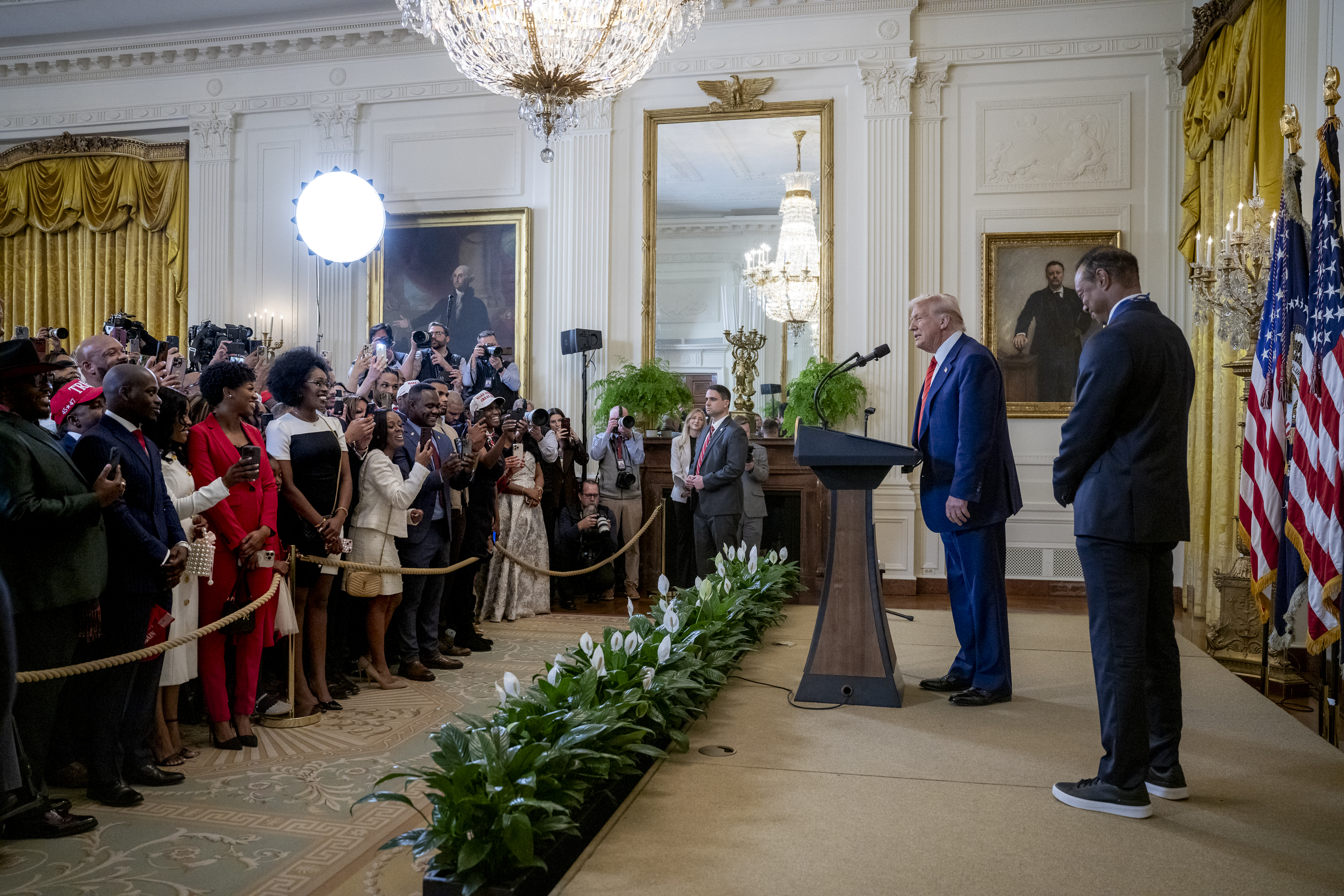
Trump and Tiger Woods at White House reception honoring Black History Month, February 20, 2025

In response to anti-DEI executive actions and against what the administration called "improper ideology", numerous agencies and websites altered or removed material related to women, racial minorities, and transgender individuals. The National Park Service removed mentions of transgender individuals from its website on the Stonewall riots, changed "LGBT" to "LGB", and removed the word "queer". The National Cryptologic Museum papered over portraits of women and racial minorities in their Hall of Honor, including those of Elizebeth Smith Friedman, Washington Wong, and Ralph W. Adams Jr. The portraits were restored after news of the actions began circulating online. Pictures that celebrated women in science were removed from NASA buildings. Some removed content deemed "DEI" relating to Jackie Robinson, the Tuskegee Airmen, the Enola Gay, and the Navajo Code Talkers were later restored.

The Initial Rescissions of Harmful Executive Orders and Actions rescinded Executive Order 13985, 13988 and 14020.

=== LGBTQ rights ===
In his 2024 campaign, Trump detailed a range of proposals aimed at reversing recent LGBTQ-related policies and reshaping federal guidelines on gender identity and transgender rights. He stated that on "day one", he would reverse the Biden administration's Title IX expansion, which protects transgender students' rights to use bathrooms, locker rooms, and pronouns that align with their gender identity. He also pledged to cut federal funding to schools promoting "critical race theory, transgender insanity, and other inappropriate racial, sexual, or political content". His proposed policies would significantly limit gender-affirming care, including calling for a federal ban on such care for minors and blocking Medicare and Medicaid funding for doctors providing gender-affirming services. Trump also proposed forbidding federal agencies from "promoting" gender transitions and plans to task the Justice Department with investigating potential long-term effects of gender-affirming treatments.

In his inauguration speech, Trump stated "it will be the official policy of the United States government that there are only two genders, male and female". Later that day, he issued the first LGBTQ-related executive order of his second term.

Trump signed orders including:

- On January 20, "Defending Women from Gender Ideology Extremism and Restoring Biological Truth to the Federal Government" defined sex as binary. It does not include any exceptions for intersex people for whom a sex may not be clearly assigned at birth immediately. As a consequence of the order:
  - The State Department froze all applications for US passports with the non-binary 'X' marker and announced that passports would only reflect a person's sex assigned at birth. In June, a judge blocked the policy. In September, the Trump administration appealed to the Supreme Court.
  - Federal employees were ordered to adjust their email signatures to cease listing personal pronouns aligned with their gender identity.
  - In February, the U.S. Equal Employment Opportunity Commission moved to dismiss six of its own pending cases alleging gender identity discrimination.
- On January 27, "Prioritizing Military Excellence and Readiness" rescinded inclusion of transgender members of the US military. (On March 27, however, a district court issued a preliminary injunction.)
- On January 28, "Protecting Children from Chemical and Surgical Mutilation" threatened the federal funding of any medical institution that provides gender-affirming care for a person under 19. (On February 13, however, a judge blocked it.)
- On January 29, "Ending Radical Indoctrination in K–12 Schooling" threatened the federal funding of any school that recognizes a child's gender transition, including name or pronoun changes.
- On February 5, "Keeping Men Out of Women's Sports" attempted to ban transgender women and girl athletes from participating in women's and girls' sports.
- On February 6, "Eradicating Anti-Christian Bias" referred to certain recognitions of sexual orientation and gender identity as examples of "anti-Christian government".
- On March 14, "Additional Rescissions of Harmful Executive Orders and Actions" rescinded Biden's 2021 "Memorandum on Advancing the Human Rights of Lesbian, Gay, Bisexual, Transgender, Queer, and Intersex Persons Around the World". In that memo, Biden had pledged the US to "pursue an end to discrimination on the basis of sexual orientation, gender identity or expression, or sex characteristics" and "lead by the power of our example in the cause of advancing the human rights of LGBTQI+ persons around the world."
- On March 20, "Improving Education Outcomes by Empowering Parents, States, and Communities" ordered organizations funded by the Department of Education to comply with Trump's policies, including by ending DEI or any "programs promoting gender ideology".
- On March 25, "Preserving and Protecting the Integrity of American Elections" imposed new requirements to prove identity when registering to vote. The required forms of identification contain gender markers, which had become increasingly difficult or impossible to change following Trump's original order on the topic (January 20, "Defending Women"). However, on June 13, a federal district judge blocked the March 25 order from taking effect.

Trump ordered all DEI programs shut down by January 22, placed all employees of such programs on immediate leave, and demanded federal employees report on their colleagues attempting to "disguise these programs by using coded or imprecise language". Trump rescinded Executive Order 11246 signed by former president Lyndon Johnson forbidding employment discrimination on the basis of race, color, religion and national origin, and establishing affirmative action. He attempted to impose more restrictive "red state" social policies onto "blue states" by threatening to cut off federal funding in what was described as an escalation of a culture war.

On May 4, 2025, the New York Times reported that nearly half of the 669 grants "canceled in whole or in part" by the NIH had been related to LGBTQ health, amounting to the cancellation of "more than $800 million worth of research into the health of L.G.B.T.Q. people", including dozens of HIV studies.

== Environment ==
A con job and a scam

[Climate change] is the greatest con job ever perpetrated on the world, in my opinion. ... All of these predictions...were made by stupid people that of course their country's fortunes and given those same countries, no chance for success. If you don't get away from this green scam, your country is going to fail.

— US President Donald Trump
to the UN General Assembly,
23 September 2025

Lee Zeldin in December 2025 claiming "we have proudly launched a massive blitz that amounts to the largest deregulatory effort by any agency in the history of the United States"

At a private dinner at Mar-a-Lago in April 2024, Trump encouraged fossil fuel companies to donate to his campaign, saying that he would roll back environmental regulations if elected. Trump's transition team for climate and the environment was led by David Bernhardt, a former oil lobbyist who served as interior secretary, and Andrew R. Wheeler, a former coal lobbyist who led the EPA under Trump. The team withdrew from the Paris Agreement for a second time (the only country in the world to do so), expand drilling and mining on public land, and dismantle offices working to end pollution. Trump pledged to redraw the boundaries of the Bears Ears and Grand Staircase–Escalante National Monuments as he did in his first term, end a pause on new natural gas export terminals that began under President Joe Biden, and prevent states from setting their own pollution standards.

On his first day in office, Trump declared a "national energy emergency" despite the U.S.'s producing more oil and exporting more natural gas than any other country, and, for a second time, made the U.S. the only country to withdraw from the 2015 Paris Climate Agreement. Trump also signed the Initial Rescissions of Harmful Executive Orders and Actions.

On January 20, 2025, Trump signed Executive Order 14154 (Unleashing American Energy) which orders

- agencies to "develop and begin implementing action plans to suspend, revise, or rescind all agency actions identified as unduly burdensome" "on the identification, development, or use of domestic energy resources—with particular attention to oil, natural gas, coal, hydropower, biofuels, critical mineral, and nuclear energy resources"
- the attorney general to request that courts "stay or otherwise delay further litigation, or seek other appropriate relief consistent with this order"
- revoking "All activities, programs, and operations associated with the American Climate Corps"
- rescinding Council on Environmental Quality's National Environmental Policy Act regulations in their entirety
- "all agencies must prioritize efficiency and certainty over any other objectives".
- The Director of the NEC and the Director of the Office of Legislative Affairs shall jointly prepare recommendations to Congress, which shall "provide greater certainty in the Federal permitting process, including, but not limited to, streamlining the judicial review of the application of NEPA".
- "eliminating the “social cost of carbon” calculation from any Federal permitting or regulatory decision"
- reconsideration of the endangerment finding
- agencies pause the disbursement of funds appropriated through the Inflation Reduction Act of 2022 or the Infrastructure Investment and Jobs Act, "including but not limited to funds for electric vehicle charging stations made available through the National Electric Vehicle Infrastructure Formula Program and the Charging and Fueling Infrastructure Discretionary Grant Program"
- restarting reviews of applications for approvals of liquified natural gas export projects "as expeditiously as possible"
- undertaking steps to revise or rescind "all agency actions that impose undue burdens on the domestic mining and processing of non-fuel minerals"
- reassessing public lands withdrawals
- prioritizing efforts to accelerate the ongoing, detailed geologic mapping of the United States, with a focus on locating previously unknown deposits of critical minerals
- ensuring "that critical mineral projects, including the processing of critical minerals, receive consideration for Federal support"
- assessing "whether exploitative practices and state-assisted mineral projects abroad are unlawful or unduly burden or restrict United States commerce"
- assessing "the quantity and inflow of minerals that are likely the product of forced labor into the United States and whether such inflows pose a threat to national security"
- ensuring "that the National Defense Stockpile will provide a robust supply of critical minerals in event of future shortfall"
- "policy recommendations to enhance the competitiveness of American mining and refining companies in other mineral-wealthy nations"

Trump also appointed oil, gas, and chemical industry lobbyists to the Environmental Protection Agency to roll back climate rules and pollution controls.

In February 2025, the administration terminated the Environmental and Climate Justice Block Grant Program. In June 2026, district judge Richard Gergel ruled that the terminations were unlawful and in July 2026 a federal judge ordered the program's remaining $2.8 billion in funds be distributed.

In March 2025, the Environmental Protection Agency announced the "Biggest Deregulatory Action in U.S. History".

By the end of its fourth month, Trump's second administration had reduced staffing at several major federal environmental agencies; reduced regulations against air pollution; stopped tracking major sources of greenhouse gases that cause global warming and climate change; expedited approvals for fossil fuel projects; expanded logging permits in national forests; dismissed scientists working on the Congressionally mandated National Climate Assessment; purged the phrases "climate crisis" and "climate science" from government websites; and transferred some responsibility for disaster management to the states despite there having been 27 billion-dollar disasters in 2024 (versus 3 such disasters in 1980).

During the 2025 shutdown, the administration retained federal employees that "issue permits for oil, gas and mining operations are on the job, along with those working to repeal pollution limits."

== Economy ==
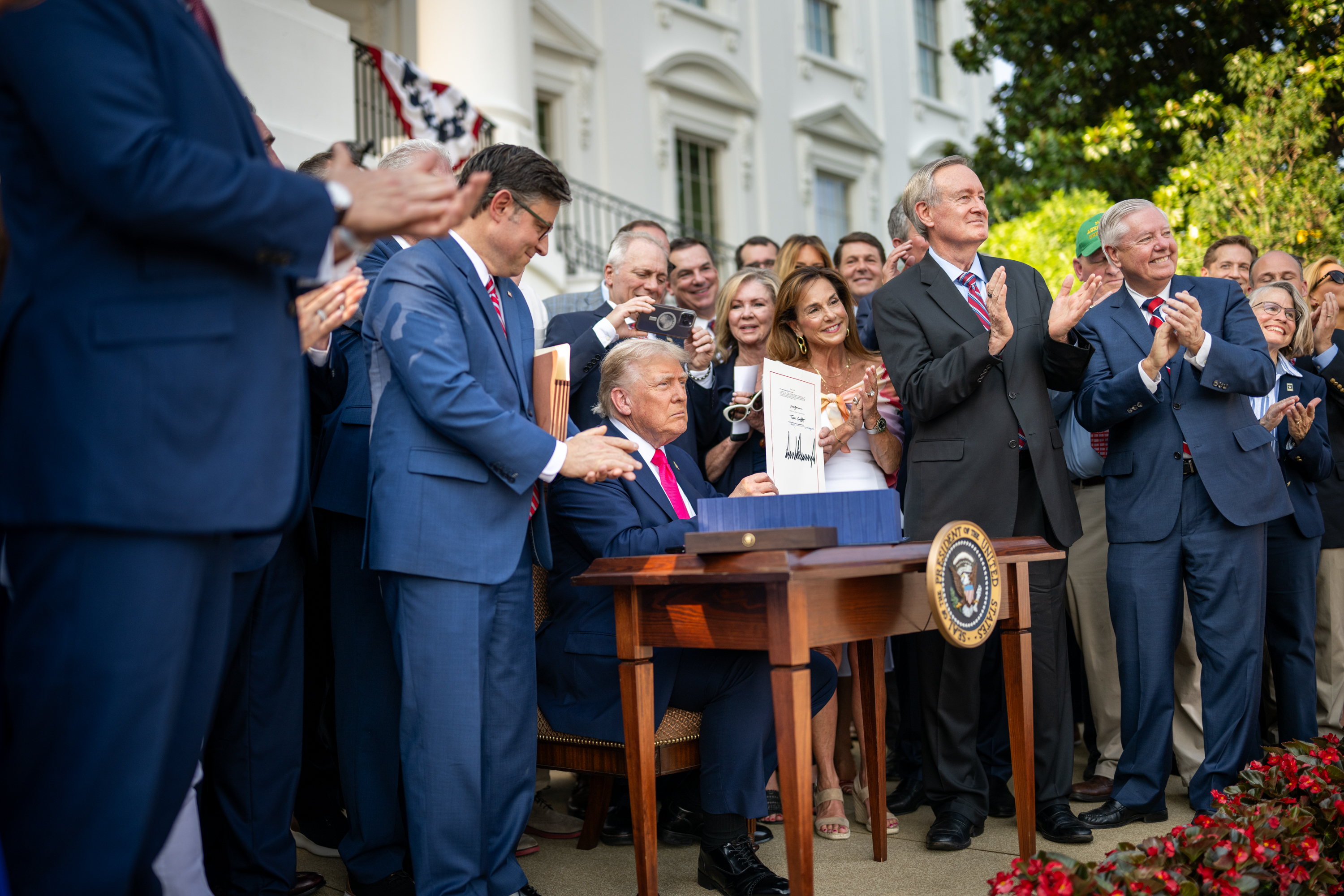
President Trump delivered most of his economic and security campaign promises on July 4, 2025, by enacting the One Big Beautiful Bill Act.

Trump inherited a resilient economy from the Biden administration, with increasing economic growth, low unemployment, and declining inflation. (Note: Attributed to multiple sources:) When Trump assumed office in January 2025, the seasonally adjusted unemployment rate was 4%, and the inflation rate, measured by the Personal Consumption Expenditure price index, was projected to range between 2.2% and 2.4% for 2025. The New York Times and Economic Policy Institute described the economy as "in better shape than that bequeathed to any newly elected president since George W. Bush came into office in 2001". However, polls found that many Americans still felt the impacts of the 2021–2023 inflation surge, which partly contributed to Trump's reelection.

In a March 2025 media interview, Trump was asked if he expected a recession to occur in 2025, to which he answered: "I hate to predict things like that. There is a period of transition, because what we're doing is very big." By that month, the Trump administration shut down the Federal Economic Statistics Advisory Committee and the Bureau of Economic Analysis Advisory Committee, both of which calculated economic data and had operated for over 20 years. On March 13, 2025, the S&P 500 index entered into a correction, dropping 10% from its peak on February 19, 2025. The drop came amidst what the Associated Press called "historic" jumps in public anxiety caused by Trump's tariff threats, with large drops in consumer sentiment and increased expectations of higher inflation rates among consumers and Wall Street economists.

Markets dropped substantially in early April 2025 following Trump's imposition of tariffs on nearly all countries, prompting retaliation from trade partners that triggered a stock market crash. The crash triggered what The Associated Press described as a "freak" sell-off in the bond market. The sell-off was attributed to a loss of confidence among investors in the United States as a safe, stable place to store money. In May 2025, Trump said of the American economy: "I think the good parts are the Trump economy and the bad parts are the Biden economy".

=== Taxation and deficits ===
In January 2025, Republicans began considering cuts for various social programs in order to pay for the proposed tax cuts. The Congressional Budget Office estimated in January 2025 that extending the 2017 Trump tax cuts could increase deficits by more than $4 trillion over 10 years, if not offset by spending cuts. Trump's campaign proposals to exempt Social Security benefits, tip and overtime income from taxation would further increase deficits. The Committee for a Responsible Federal Budget estimated that all of Trump's tax cut proposals together would reduce federal tax receipts by $5 trillion to $11 trillion over a decade, if not offset. Some congressional Republicans argued the tax cuts would not increase deficits. Trump, with the help of Elon Musk, launched a campaign to reduce the federal workforce by thousands of employees, primarily focusing on probationary staff, to streamline government operations. This has sparked criticism over the potential disruption of vital services and raised concerns about employee rights, with legal challenges and internal dissent emerging.

=== "Big, Beautiful" Budget Bill ===
Much of Trump's economic agenda was encapsulated in the One Big Beautiful Bill Act, which Trump signed into law on July 4, 2025. The Bill's primary focus is a $4 trillion tax cut that permanently enshrined many tax cuts included in the Tax Cuts and Jobs Act, while also creating a Medicaid work requirement for all childless able-bodied adults and banning Medicaid funding to Planned Parenthood, eliminating tax credits for clean energy created by the Inflation Reduction Act, increasing the age at which the SNAP work requirement is eliminated from 54 to 64 and extending it to individuals with children between the ages of 7 and 18, and increasing military spending by $150 billion and spending to support Trump's immigration enforcement efforts by $175 billion. The original House version was passed on May 22, 2025.

After being sent to the United States Senate, the Bill was subject to renegotiation, and ultimately came to include a variety of changes, including an increase in the debt limit by $5 trillion, as opposed to the initial $4 trillion, while softening the SNAP work requirement to solely extending to parents with children aged 14–18, extending the Medicaid work requirements to parents with children aged 14–18, and eliminating an excise tax on wind and solar energy. The Senate Bill was passed 51–50 on July 1, 2025, with Vice President JD Vance casting a tie-breaking vote in support of the bill, after Republican Senators Rand Paul, Thom Tillis, along with all Democrats, refused to support it, while Senator Lisa Murkowski was persuaded to support the bill, despite her misgivings about Medicaid cuts. The bill was returned to the House of Representatives, where House Speaker Mike Johnson secured final passage on July 3, 2025, persuading many fiscally conservative holdouts in the House, to support it. Critics have charged that the bill's tax cuts, including corporate tax write-offs for the cost of for equipment and Research and development and increasing the SALT tax deduction from $10,000 to 40,000, would benefit the wealthy, while cuts to Medicaid and SNAP would disproportionately harm lower-class Americans. An estimated 11.8 million Americans may lose health insurance as a result of the bill, while an estimated 5 million Americans are at risk of losing some or all of their SNAP benefits.

=== Tariffs policy ===
President Donald Trump is a staunch proponent of tariffs and has been described by some academics as a mercantilist. During his 2024 campaign, Trump promised to impose higher tariffs on all countries, especially China. On November 25, 2024, following his election victory, Trump said he would sign an executive order placing 25% tariffs on Canada and Mexico, and impose an additional 10% tariff on China.

==== Threats to BRICS nations over currency ====
On November 30, 2024, Trump threatened to impose a 100% tariff on BRICS nations if they tried to create a new BRICS currency or promote another currency to replace the U.S. dollar as the global reserve currency.

==== February 1 tariffs and one month pause ====
On February 1, 2025, Trump signed three executive orders imposing a 25% tariff on all goods from Mexico and Canada (although energy imports from Canada were only to be taxed at 10%), and a 10% tariff on China, originally due to take effect on February 4.

In response to the higher tariffs, representatives from Mexico and Canada announced intentions to impose retaliatory tariffs on the United States, which if implemented could have led to an increase in tariff rates in accordance with a clause included in the orders signed by Trump. On February 3, Trump announced that the tariffs on both Mexico and Canada would be paused for one month after the countries agreed to take further steps to prevent the trafficking of drugs into the United States.

Without this pause, Trump's executive order would have raised American tariffs to the highest in the world, with the new tariffs being the highest since the Smoot–Hawley Tariff Act of 1930. According to Kim Clausing of the Peterson Institute for International Economics, the proposed tariffs on Canada, Mexico, and China would represent the "largest tax increase [in the United States] since the 1990s."

==== April 2 "Liberation Day" and stock market declines ====
On April 2, a day Trump nicknamed "Liberation Day", Trump announced a 10% universal import duty on all goods brought into the US and even higher rates for 57 trading partners. In response, markets sunk sharply lower.

Trump announces his "Liberation Day" tariffs on April 2, 2025.

In large part as a response to the new tariffs, on April 17 the European Central Bank announced it was reducing interest rates on loans by a quarter of one percent to a rate of 2.25% (2-and-a-quarter percent). European inflation seemed to be settling towards 2%, and the bank's governors expressed concern over economic growth. They said that "the adverse and volatile market response to the trade tensions is likely to have a tightening impact on financing conditions."

==== Tariff loophole on $800 and less expires on May 2 ====
On May 2, a tariff loophole expired which previously exempted duties on packages $800 or less. This change is expected to directly affect customers of the large Chinese retailers Shein and Temu. In addition, the U.S. Customs and Border Protection (CBP) will be responsible for the inspection of millions of new packages. On April 30, President Trump described this loophole as "a big scam going on against our country, against really small businesses."

==== May 12 deal with China ====
On May 12, the United States and China announced that tariffs would be reduced for a period of 90 days. U.S. tariffs on Chinese goods would be reduced from 145% to 30% and Chinese tariffs on U.S. goods would be reduced from 125% to 10%. However, this 30% is still more expensive for consumers in the United States compared to the state of affairs before Trump's initial tariffs.

==== Steel tariffs doubled and sale (with protections) of U.S. Steel to Nippon ====
In late May, Trump announced that he was doubling tariffs on steel from 25% to 50%.

Trump delivers remarks on U.S. steel deal in West Mifflin, Pennsylvania on May 30, 2025.

Additionally, whereas the Biden administration had not approved the sale of U.S. Steel to the Japanese conglomerate Nippon, the Trump administration was approving this same sale with protections. For example, the majority of the U.S. Steel board of directors will be Americans including some members appointed by the U.S. government with its "golden share" in the company. Even so, U.S. Steel will be a "wholly owned subsidiary" of Nippon Steel North America. The United Steelworkers expressed opposition and doubts about the sale, saying that Nippon had a "long and proven track record of violating our trade law."

== Emergency management ==
Just before the Los Angeles fires were contained, the United States Army Corps of Engineers started releasing water from federal reservoirs in California's Lake Success and Lake Kaweah via the Schafer Dam and Terminus Dam respectively, for a total of 2.2 billion gallons of water per local authorities. The Army Corps initially stated that the water was for California to "respond to the wildfires", following an executive order by Trump. However, the Army Corps later stated that the released water "could not be delivered to Southern California directly", that other government agencies said they "likely could not utilize the additional water with such short notice", and that the water release was stopped after "elected officials expressed concerns from their constituents about potential flooding of downstream lands".

In February 2025, Trump signed a pair of executive orders blocking FEMA funds from being used to help undocumented immigrants in "sanctuary cities." This had the consequence of freezing billions of dollars in disaster grants, which were funding rebuilding efforts for communities struck by Hurricane Helene. In April 2025, the Federal Emergency Management Agency (FEMA) under Trump has denied North Carolina's request to extend the full reimbursement period for Hurricane Helene recovery efforts. The Trump administration also turned down a request from Georgia governor Brian Kemp for a second deadline extension to apply for relief from the state following Hurricane Helene in March 2025.

Tornadoes hit the state of Mississippi on March 14 and 15, and were especially damaging to Tylertown in southern Mississippi. Approximately two weeks later on April 1, Governor Tate Reeves (Republican) requested that FEMA issue a major disaster declaration for parts of his state. David Richardson, FEMA's new acting-administrator since early May, has said regarding potential policy changes that there could be "more cost-sharing with states" and that FEMA might coordinate federal assistance "when deemed necessary."

On May 23, the Trump administration approved disaster aid for areas within eight states including Mississippi. The other seven states with areas are Nebraska, Iowa, Missouri, Kansas, Arkansas, Oklahoma, and Texas.

The previous director of FEMA, Cameron Hamilton, was appointed by President Trump in January and fired by the administration in early May, a day after he disagreed with the idea to shut down FEMA which is an idea President Trump has hinted at in describing FEMA as "very slow" and "very bureaucratic."

Trump said that “We want to wean off of FEMA, and we want to bring it back to the state level". The administration has been "delaying disaster declarations and aid payments".

A requirement by Department of Homeland Security Secretary Kristi Noem that expenditures of $100,000 or more be approved by the secretary led to 17 billion dollars in disaster funds being delayed.

== Federal government and executive power ==
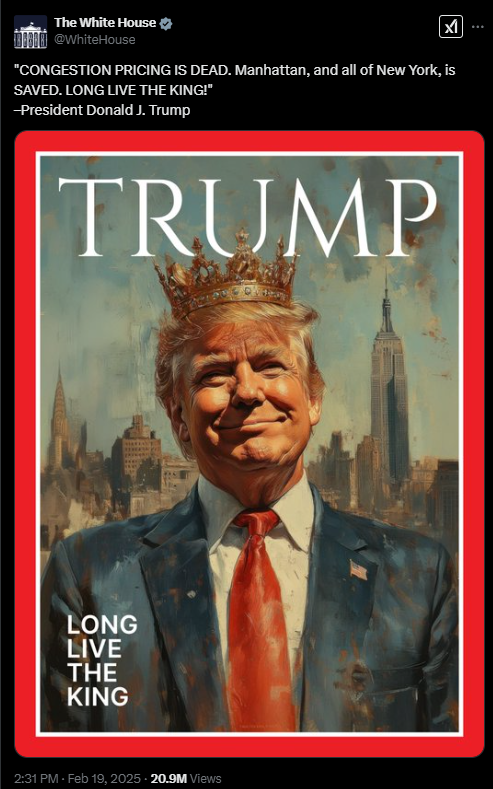
Image posted on February 19, 2025, by the official White House account likening Trump to a monarch

The second Trump administration has pursued a maximalist interpretation of the unitary executive theory. It has been noted for making sweeping assertions of executive authority, and challenging several Congressional laws and parts of the Constitution restraining presidential power. He issued an executive order to take control of independent federal agencies such as the FCC, FEC, and SEC, attacked journalists and media organizations whose coverage he disliked, placed loyalists in charge of the military and FBI, used the Department of Justice to promote his political interests, and suggested defying court orders and impeaching justices who ruled against him.

On February 15, 2025, Trump wrote on Truth Social and X: "He who saves his Country does not violate any Law", which the White House later reposted on X that day. Shortly afterward on February 19 in a post about congestion pricing in New York, Trump compared himself to a king by saying "LONG LIVE THE KING!". Later that month, Trump told the governor of Maine, Janet Mills, to "comply" with his executive order banning transgender athletes from women's sports, or he would withdraw "any federal funding" because "we are the federal law".

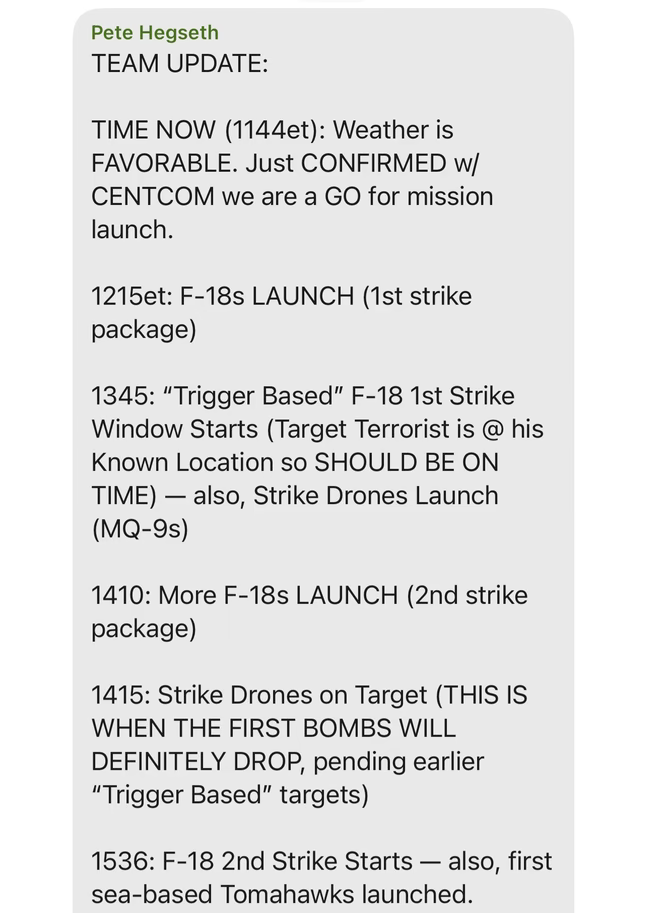

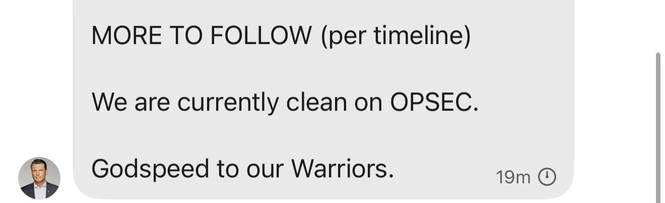
Screenshots from the leaked Signal chat showing "Pete Hegseth" discussing plans for American military operations against the Houthis in Yemen

Also in February 2025, Elon Musk declared that "all federal employees will shortly receive an email requesting to understand what they got done last week ... Failure to respond will be taken as a resignation"; within hours federal employees received an email from the United States Office of Personnel Management demanding their response, within two days, on work done last week.

In March 2025, senior Trump administration officials used the Signal private messaging service to discuss imminent military operations against the Houthis in Yemen, which led to the United States government group chat leak when Jeffrey Goldberg, the editor-in-chief of the American magazine The Atlantic, was added to the chat by Michael Waltz, the national security advisor. The Atlantic reported on and published details of the chat, showing that defense secretary Pete Hegseth used the chat to share details of the impending strikes, including the launch times of F-18 aircraft, MQ-9 drones and Tomahawk missiles, as well as the time when the F-18 aircraft would reach their targets, and the time when the bombs would land. Some of the chat's other members were Vice President JD Vance, Director of National Intelligence Tulsi Gabbard, and CIA director John Ratcliffe. The incident raised several issues, including the Trump administration officials' use of a non-government communication system and the potential transmission of classified information on it, as well as Signal's automatic deletion of chat logs contradicting with the requirement to preserve government records.

Trump reinstated Schedule F and created Schedule G through Executive Order 14317.

=== DOGE (Department of Government Efficiency) ===
The Trump administration established the Department of Government Efficiency (DOGE), a temporary organization with Elon Musk as its administrator, and renamed the United States Digital Service to the United States DOGE Service to function as a parent agency. DOGE is a unit tasked with recommending cost-cutting measures, and according to the executive order that established it, its formal purpose is to "modernize federal technology and software to maximize governmental efficiency and productivity".

In late January 2025, Wired reported that the top ranks of the human resources-focused United States Office of Personnel Management (OPM) had been filled by new hires who had formerly worked for either Elon Musk, Peter Thiel, Republican politicians or right-wing media outlets, while Musk's allies were installed into the technology-focused General Services Administration and planned massive spending cuts. On January 28, the OPM offered a "deferred resignation" scheme to federal government employees to announce their resignation by February 6, while stating that employees who resigned would still receive salary and benefits until September 30, 2025. The offer made was similar to Elon Musk's notice to employees after he took control of Twitter. On January 31, Trump added that he would nullify federal employee union contracts, specifically including one with the Education Department, that had been agreed to late in Biden's term. Musk also gained access to the Treasury's payment system. Two OPM officials told Reuters that Musk's allies locked some OPM officials from accessing OPM data systems, with one official saying this enabled Musk's allies to use the systems without oversight. It was reported that this gave DOGE "full access" to the major U.S. Treasury database controlling the expenditure of 6 trillion dollars, as well as "the sensitive personal data of millions of Americans as well as details of public contractors who compete directly with Musk's own businesses." It was reported that the previous top civil servant who was associated with the database was placed on leave and then resigned after objecting to DOGE's access. It was reported that this access could allow Musk to block payments by the U.S. government to many federal programs. Senator Ron Wyden stated that this access was a "national security risk."

On March 21, Elon Musk visited the Pentagon. This was originally scheduled to be a non-classified briefing on China with the Joint Chiefs. However, seemingly after The New York Times reported the previous day on possible Musk conflicts-of-interest due to business interests in China, this was changed to a meeting with Secretary of Defense Pete Hegseth on efficiency. President Trump said, "Elon has businesses in China, and he would be susceptible perhaps to that. But it was such a fake story." (Note: The New York Times article links to an earlier tweet by chief Pentagon spokesman Sean Parnell refuting the very first New York Times report, including a screen capture of it. It was originally published in the section "Trump Administration – Live updates", and titled "Musk Set to Get Access to Top Secret U.S. Plan for Potential War With China".) Musk said he wants to find those who leaked details about this meeting ahead of time.

==== Mass layoffs ====
Trump oversaw mass firings of federal workers at various agencies, many of them described as breaking with precedent or federal law and with the intent to replace them with workers more aligned with Trump's agenda. On January 24, 2025, less than a week into Trump's second presidency, he fired 17 independent inspectors general at federal agencies, which appeared to violate federal law that requires advance notice of dismissals to both chambers of congress with reasons given 30 days in advance. Trump also fired all Democratic but not Republican members of the Privacy and Civil Liberties Oversight Board, which would prevent the board from meeting quorum and functioning. Trump also fired members of the Equal Employment Opportunity Commission, National Labor Relations Board, over 160 members of the National Security Council for not aligning with his agenda, and 56 senior officials at USAID for allegedly attempting to thwart his priorities.

The New York Times reported in January 2025 that the White House might be hoping the firings would be challenged in court, ultimately the Supreme Court, as test cases to invoke the unitary executive theory to give the president exclusive control of the executive branch. The Republican-appointed supermajority on the Court had in recent years indicated support for the theory, which had also been promoted by Project 2025. On the first day of his second term in January 2025, Trump named a Republican as acting chair of the United States Merit Systems Protection Board. In February 2025, Trump removed a Democratic member of the board, Cathy Harris, who had served three years of her term, and demoted the other Democratic member. Harris then sued the Trump administration, alleging that her removal was illegal. On March 4, 2025, a U.S. district judge, citing U.S. Supreme Court cases from 1933 and 1953, entered a permanent injunction ordering that she be reinstated.

==== Lawsuits ====
On March 13, federal judge William Alsup of San Francisco ordered that fired employees must be re-hired at the Department of Veterans Affairs, Department of Agriculture, Department of Defense, the Department of Energy, Department of Interior, and Department of Treasury. He ruled that blanket claims of poor performance cannot be used as a "gimmick" to get around the Reduction in Force Act, and stated that "it is a sad day when our government would fire some good employee and say it was based on performance when they know good and well that's a lie." The Ninth Circuit Court rejected the Trump administration's appeal for them to stay Alsup's ruling, with the appeals court stating that a stay "would not preserve the status quo. It would do just the opposite — it would disrupt the status quo and turn it on its head".

In a second lawsuit also on March 13, federal judge James Bredar of Maryland issued a broader order that the Trump administration must re-hire workers who had been fired from 12 departments and 6 agencies. This was the result of a lawsuit brought by 19 states and the District of Columbia that they had not been given the legally-required advance notice of large layoffs. And that the reason of "performance" was not true. Judge Bredar wrote, "There were no individualized assessments of employees. They were all just fired. Collectively."

The Trump administration is both appealing this second decision and complying with it in the meantime. Twenty-four thousand employees are in the process of being re-hired, with most being placed on administrative leave with full pay and benefits as the in-between step. The re-hires include 6,400 employees at the IRS, 5,700 employees at the Department of Agriculture, 3,200 employees at the Department of Health and Human Services, and 1,700 employees at the Department of Veteran's Affairs, with all these numbers being rounded to the nearest hundred. Judge William Alsup wrote in a brief follow-up order that re-hired employees must be placed back in their former posts, and not merely placed on administrative leave. On April 8, the U.S. Supreme Court halted the injunction aspect of Judge Alsup's order of immediately re-hiring. However, the Supreme Court didn't rule on the merits of this case as it more slowly and normally works its way through the courts.

=== Federal funding freeze ===
On January 27, 2025, the Trump administration's Office of Management and Budget (OMB) released memo M-25-13, which ordered the federal government to take action the next day to "temporarily pause all activities related to obligation or disbursement of all federal financial assistance, and other relevant agency activities that may be implicated by [Trump's] executive orders, including, but not limited to, financial assistance for foreign aid, nongovernmental organizations, DEI, woke gender ideology, and the Green New Deal". The memo continued that this would allow the Trump administration to "determine the best uses of the funding for those programs consistent with the law and [Trump's] priorities", while "Medicare or Social Security benefits" were exempted from being affected. 2,600 federal programs were selected for review. The memo sparked considerable uncertainty among government employees, lawmakers and nonprofit organizations.

On January 28, 2025, the Medicaid payment portal shut down across the United States before returning online later that day; the Trump administration said that the shutdown was not related to the funding freeze. Nonprofit organizations reported being unable to enter federal government systems to receive federal funds. The OMB released an additional statement declaring several programs (Medicaid, SNAP, "funds for small businesses, farmers, Pell grants, Head Start, rental assistance", student loans, and "any program that provides direct benefits to Americans") to be exempt from the federal funding freeze. After several organizations sued, the OMB memo was blocked by United States District Judge Loren AliKhan before the freeze began, with the block to expire on February 3.

On January 29, the OMB withdrew memo M-25-13, but White House press secretary Karoline Leavitt said that this did not nullify the federal funding freeze. On February 1, after 22 states and the District of Columbia sued, District judge John J. McConnell Jr. ordered the Trump administration to temporarily stop the federal funding freeze in those states, as "no federal law would authorize the executive's unilateral action here". McConnell took action after concluding that the withdrawal of the "wide-ranging, all-encompassing, and ambiguous" OMB memo was "in name-only and may have been issued simply to defeat the jurisdiction of the courts". On February 10, McConnell cited the suing states as providing "evidence" that the Trump administration "in some cases have continued to improperly freeze federal funds and refused to resume disbursement of appropriated federal funds", causing "irreparable harm to a vast portion of this country"; hence McConnell ordered the Trump administration to "immediately restore frozen funding".

=== Relationship with other branches ===
Trump in February 2022 at the Governors Working Session, "I'm - We are the federal law"

After federal district judge Paul Engelmayer ruled in February 2025 to block DOGE from accessing United States Treasury payment systems, Trump responded that "no judge should, frankly, be allowed to make that kind of a decision", while Vance commented that "judges aren't allowed to control the executive's legitimate power." After multiple federal judges ruled against the Trump administration's actions, White House Press Secretary Karoline Leavitt in February 2025 denied that there was a "constitutional crisis taking place here at the White House", instead saying that the "judges are acting as judicial activists" and "the real constitutional crisis is taking place within our judicial branch." Meanwhile, Musk proposed "an immediate wave of judicial impeachments". In March 2025, when Judge William Alsup ordered the Trump administration to rehire probationary federal government employees they had fired, with Alsup stating that firings needed to follow a lawful process, Leavitt declared Alsup's decision to be "absurd and unconstitutional", as she stated: "If a federal district court judge would like executive powers, they can try and run for President themselves."

When asked if the administration intended to abide by the ruling of Judge Karin Immergut blocking the deployment of the Oregon national guard, Miller responded "under title ten of the U.S. code the president has plenary authority". In Trump v. United States, the court ruled that the president has absolute immunity for "official acts".

The administration arrested Hannah Dugan and sued all 15 federal judges in Maryland in United States v. Russell.

==== During the deportation of Venezuelans under the Alien Enemies Act ====
On March 15, 2025, the American Civil Liberties Union and Democracy Forward filed suit against the Trump administration in anticipation of Trump invoking the Alien Enemies Act of 1798, which Trump did later the same day. Chief Judge James Boasberg of the U.S. District Court for the District of Columbia issued a temporary restraining order that any foreigners in the Trump administration's custody could not be deported under the act, pending further judicial rulings in the legal case. Boasberg also made the verbal order: "Any plane containing these folks that is going to take off or is in the air needs to be returned to the United States". Despite Boasberg's order, the Trump administration used three planes to deport around 250 people, alleged to be Venezuelan gang members, to El Salvador. Amnesty International USA has stated that these flights are "yet another example of the Trump administration's racist targeting" of Venezuelans "based on sweeping claims of gang affiliation".

White House press secretary Karoline Leavitt stated, "The administration did not 'refuse to comply' with a court order." Leavitt expressed doubts about "whether a verbal order carries the same weight as a written order", while the Trump administration argued in court that "an oral directive is not enforceable as an injunction". The Trump administration also stated that plane was already airborne and outside United States airspace. Trump's border czar Tom Homan said that the Trump administration completed the deportations despite the court order because Boasberg's order was made when the planes were above international waters after departing the United States; Homan also declared regarding deportations: "Another flight every day. ... We are not stopping. I don't care what the judges think." White House press secretary Karoline Leavitt said that Boasberg's order "had no lawful basis ... A single judge in a single city cannot direct the movements of an aircraft carrier [commercial jet] full of foreign alien terrorists who were physically expelled from U.S. soil."

Judge Boasberg gave the Trump administration until March 18 to provide details of the timing of the flights. He stated he would not issue another ruling until a hearing scheduled for March 21. Trump criticized Boasberg as "crooked" and called for him to be impeached, leading John Roberts, the chief justice of the Supreme Court, to rebuke Trump, saying "impeachment is not an appropriate response to disagreement concerning a judicial decision". Attorney General Pam Bondi said on March 19 regarding Boasberg: "this judge has no right to ask those questions" regarding details about the deportation flights, and has "no power" to order the Trump administration to stop the deportation flights, as Bondi declared that judges are "meddling in our government". The family of one deported man stated he had been a tattoo artist for 10 years and was not a gang member. The families of five other deported persons made similar claims. In a 5–4 decision issued on April 7, in a case pertaining to alleged Venezuelan members of the Tren de Aragua criminal gang, the United States Supreme Court ruled that the Trump administration may deport persons under the Alien Enemies Act of 1798. However, persons who are detained must be provided notice "within a reasonable time and in such a manner as will allow them to actually seek habeas relief."

=== Federal unions ===
In 2025, Donald Trump signed Executive Orders 14251 and 14343, which was reported to have led to over 445,000 federal employees losing their union protections.

== Health ==
On November 14, 2024, Trump announced that he would nominate Robert F. Kennedy Jr. for Health and Human Services Secretary. This was controversial given Kennedy's repeated endorsement of anti-vaccine conspiracy theories, with the director of the American Public Health Association stating that Kennedy "already caused great damage in health in the country" and that he is also "a person without a health background". In December, Trump revealed he was discussing ending childhood vaccination programs with Kennedy and promoted the scientifically debunked claim of a link between vaccines and autism. After January 20, 2025, the Trump administration ordered a freeze on all communications and reports from HHS and sub-agencies, unless approved by a political appointee. On January 22, DHS announced that ICE would start arresting illegal immigrants in hospitals, if necessary. The administration worked (Note: This is an Independent agency of the U.S. government) to close the Chemical Safety Board. Trump nominated Casey Means to be Surgeon General of the United States. David Geier was reportedly hired by Kennedy. Ralph Lee Abraham was appointed as the Principal Deputy Director of the CDC. The MAHA Commission released the MAHA report and the MAHA strategy report.

After cutting funding to the Women's Health Initiative, the administration reversed course.

The administration sought "unprecedented access to medical records for millions of federal workers and retirees, and their families."

=== HHS ===
==== CDC ====
In March 2025, the CDC rescinded $11.4 billion in funds allocated in response to the COVID-19 pandemic to state and community health departments, nongovernment organizations and international recipients.

On May 14, 2025, Robert F. Kennedy Jr. stated that lawyer Matthew Buzzelli is acting CDC director, though the CDC web site did not list that name.

Susan Monarez was confirmed as CDC head on July 31, 2025, but on August 27, it was announced on X (formerly twitter) that she had been fired. Monarez disputed the legality of the firing, as it had not been carried out by the President, and it had been falsely reported that she had resigned. The President later officially carried out the firing. Monarez was fired after refusing to rubber stamp what were expected to be unscientific recommendations from the Advisory Committee on Immunization Practices and to fire senior staff vaccine experts. The next day, the Trump administration announced the selection of Deputy Secretary of Health and Human Services Jim O'Neill as a replacement.

Following news of Monarez's ousting, Chief Medical Officer Debra Houry, Director of the National Center for Immunization and Respiratory Diseases Demetre Daskalakis, Director of the National Center for Emerging and Zoonotic Infectious Diseases Daniel Jernigan, and Director of the Office of Public Health Data, Surveillance, and Technology Jennifer Layden announced their resignations: Dozens of CDC employees walked out of headquarters and protested in support of Monarez and the departing officials.

==== FDA ====
In September 2025, the FDA announced it would be cracking down on direct-to-consumer advertising and would be taking "actions to restrict the sale" of "ingestible fluoride prescription drug products for children".

In October 2025, the FDA announced "significant action to make it faster and less costly to develop biosimilar medicines, which are lower-cost “generic” alternatives to biologic drugs that treat serious and chronic diseases." In November 2025, the FDA announced it was requesting companies remove black box warnings on hormone replacement therapy.

==== HHS reorganization ====
By late April, the Trump administration had placed on leave and then temporarily rehired federal employees at NIOSH, who had been involved in monitoring for black lung disease. The employees are rehired through June. The administration plans to instead run the black lung surveillance program out of a new bureau called the Administration for a Healthy America.

On June 9, Kennedy fired all 17 members of the Advisory Committee on Immunization Practices. He claimed that it had "become little more than a rubber stamp for any vaccine." Senator Bill Cassidy (R-Louisiana), who is a medical doctor, said "now the fear is that the ACIP will be filled up with people who know nothing about vaccines except suspicion." These firings came before a scheduled June 25 meeting in which the committee was expected to issue new recommendations for vaccines including COVID-19.

In January 2025, it was reported that a CDC official had ordered all CDC staff to stop working with WHO, or World Health Organization. Around January 31, 2025, several CDC websites, pages, and datasets related to HIV and STI prevention, LGBT and youth health became unavailable for viewing. Shortly thereafter, the CDC ordered its scientists to retract or pause the publication of all research which had been submitted or accepted for publication, but not yet published, which included any of the following banned terms: "Gender, transgender, pregnant person, pregnant people, LGBT, transsexual, non-binary, nonbinary, assigned male at birth, assigned female at birth, biologically male, biologically female."

Also in January 2025, due to a pause in communications imposed by the second Trump administration at federal health agencies, publication of the Morbidity and Mortality Weekly Report (MMWR) was halted, the first time that had happened since its inception in 1960. The pause in communications also caused the cancellation of a meeting between the CDC and IDSA about threats to public health regarding the H5N1 influenza virus.

On February 14, 2025, around 1,300 CDC employees were laid off by the administration, which included all first-year officers of the Epidemic Intelligence Service. The cuts also terminated 16 of the 24 Laboratory Leadership Service program fellows, a program designed for early-career lab scientists to address laboratory testing shortcomings of the CDC. In the following month, the Trump administration quietly withdrew its CDC director nominee, Dave Weldon, just minutes before his scheduled Senate confirmation hearing on March 13.

In April 2025, it was reported that among the reductions is the elimination of the Freedom of Information Act team, the Division of Violence Prevention, laboratories involved in testing for antibiotic resistance, and the team responsible for determining recalls of hazardous infant products. Additional cuts affect the technology branch of the Center for Forecasting and Outbreak Analytics, which was established during the COVID-19 pandemic.

=== Healthcare coverage ===
The administration has advocated for and restricted access to medicaid through the "One Big Beautiful Bill Act" (OBBBA). OBBBA was reported to allow more medications to be exempt from Medicare's price negotiation program. On February 25, Trump signed Executive Order 14221 to improve healthcare cost transparency. In May 2025, Trump signed Executive Order 14297.

In 2025, the Centers for Medicare & Medicaid Services announced "a new (...) model" which "will test a new process on whether enhanced technologies, including artificial intelligence (AI), can expedite the prior authorization processes for select items and services that have been identified as particularly vulnerable to fraud, waste, and abuse, or inappropriate use".

Trump opposed extending ACA subsidies during the 2025 shutdown.

=== Abortion ===
Before being elected, Trump had declared that abortion should be delegated to states in April 2024. Trump criticized the Arizona Supreme Court's ruling in Planned Parenthood Arizona v. Mayes (2024), in which the court upheld an 1864 law criminalizing abortions except to save the life of the mother, stating that he would not sign a federal abortion ban.

After the Alabama Supreme Court ruled in LePage v. Center for Reproductive Medicine (2024) that frozen embryos are living beings, Trump instead positioned himself in favor of in vitro fertilisation (IVF).

On January 24, 2025, Trump reinstated the Mexico City policy ("global gag rule"), which had been rescinded by the Biden administration. Since the Reagan administration in the 1980s, this rule has been put in place during Republican administrations and rescinded during Democratic administrations. The United States rejoined the Geneva Consensus Declaration and Trump signed Enforcing the Hyde Amendment.

In June 2025, the Centers for Medicare & Medicaid Services rescinded guidance requiring that hospitals provide emergency abortions under the Emergency Medical Treatment and Active Labor Act.

In August 2025, the Department of Veterans Affairs proposed reinstating "the full exclusion on abortions and abortion counseling from the medical benefits package".

A September 2025 letter to Republican Attorneys General said the FDA "is conducting its own review" of mifepristone.

A December 2025 memo from the Office of Legal Counsel asserted that the Department of Veterans Affairs may not provide abortions which a spokesperson said would be followed "immediately".

=== IVF ===
On February 18, Trump signed Executive Order 14216, that called for the policy recommendations for reducing the out-of-pocket costs of IVF, or In Vitro Fertilisation, and recommendations on removing any legislation that "exacerbate" the costs. A fact sheet published by the White House also stated that the administration was going to look into expanding health care coverage for IVF.

In August 2025, The Washington Post reported that despite a campaign pledge that "we'll mandate your insurance company to pay for it", "The White House does not plan to require health insurers to provide coverage for in vitro fertilization services".

=== Vaccines ===
On June 25, 2025, Kennedy announced that the U.S. was stopping its donations to Gavi, the Vaccine Alliance, until Gavi can better demonstrate vaccine safety. The United States had been providing approximately 13 percent of Gavi's budget.

In early August 2025, HHS announced the beginning of a wind-down of its mRNA vaccine development activities under the Biomedical Advanced Research and Development Authority. Secretary Kennedy announced that he was stopping $500 million in funding for 22 vaccine projects using mRNA technology, including Covid, RSV, and bird flu.

Kennedy ousted Peter Marks. In The New England Journal of Medicine, Vinay Prasad and Marty Makary outlined their approach to COVID vaccines. Under this approach, vaccines for those over 65 and those with risk factors would be cleared using the current approach. For those under 65 or without risk factors, boosters would not be approved without new trials. Reportedly, FDA staff concluded that a wide range of age groups should not be restricted in receiving the vaccines "But Dr. Vinay Prasad, the agency official in charge of vaccines and gene therapies at the F.D.A., disagreed, overriding those scientists" In a tweet, Kennedy claimed that "the COVID vaccine for healthy children and healthy pregnant women has been removed from [the CDC's] recommended immunization schedule". Reportedly, a document sent to lawmakers to support Kennedy's decision "cites scientific studies that are unpublished or under dispute and mischaracterizes others". The CDC's website reportedly was updated to say that vaccines "may" be given to healthy children and pregnant women but does not specifically recommend them. As "Most private health plans are required by law to cover recommended vaccines", changes to what vaccines are recommend can affect how insurers cover them. The administration reportedly cancelled a contract awarded to Moderna for over $750 million for the development of Moderna's bird flu vaccine. In August 2025, Kennedy tweeted that "The emergency use authorizations for Covid vaccines, once used to justify broad mandates on the general public during the Biden administration, are now rescinded".

Kennedy claimed to have "personally instructed the Centers for Disease Control and Prevention to abandon its longstanding position that vaccines do not cause autism" with the agency changing its website to:

The claim "vaccines do not cause autism" is not an evidence-based claim because studies have not ruled out the possibility that infant vaccines cause autism.

A 2025 memo by Prasad said "These deaths are related to vaccination (likely/probable/possible attribution made by staff)" in "the first time, the U.S. FDA will acknowledge that COVID-19 vaccines have killed American children". In December 2025, the Advisory Committee on Immunization Practices voted to end the prior recommendation that all babies get the hepatitis B vaccine at birth. Instead, the Committee recommended "individual-based decision-making" and suggesting in its recommendation that the initial dose not be given before the baby is two months old while not changing guidance for babies whose mothers are not known to be free of hepatitis B during pregnancy.

In February 2026, the administration refused to review Moderna's MRNA flu vaccine. The refusal signed by Vinay Prasad went against the advice of FDA staff. The same month, the FDA agreed to review the vaccine.

The administration blocked the publication of multiple studies that found vaccines to be safe.

In July 2026, The Wall Street Journal reported Trump had asked Kennedy in May regarding why he wasn't doing more to investigate the alleged links between autism and vaccines. The report also stated Trump wanted to cut the number of vaccines recommended in federal guidelines for children, which he hopes will eventually cut the rates of autism. Trump also signed an executive order in May directing the HHS to cut the number of recommended vaccines in the childhood schedule.

=== Executive Order 14321 ===
Executive Order 14321 encourages civil commitments and instructs the Secretary of HHS to ensure that discretionary grants issued by the Substance Abuse and Mental Health Services Administration do not fund "harm reduction" or "safe consumption" efforts.

In response to the opioid epidemic, the administration favored a policy of tariffs, opposition to immigration and cutting funding for research and treatment in "a return to an enforcement-heavy approach".

=== Claims about autism ===
On September 22, 2025, Trump and other U.S. Department of Human Service officials delivered speeches issuing a major agenda for "combating" autism. Warnings were for doctors not to recommend during pregnancy the pain- and fever-reducer acetaminophen, which is commonly used as an ingredient in Tylenol. These warnings were issued in spite of the fact that medical experts have found no causal link between autism and the use of acetaminophen, with autism generally established to be a result of complex neurological factors. The American College of Obstetricians and Gynecologists said, "There is no clear evidence that proves a direct relationship between the prudent use of acetaminophen during pregnancy and fetal developmental issues."

Also on September 22, Trump also spoke in favor of and the FDA approved the use of the chemotherapy drug leucovorin to also help alleviate the symptoms of autism. However, the justification for this approval was based on limited evidence. A CBS News contributor said, "Not all children with autism have this defect, so there's a test you can do to assess whether that's what's at play. For those kids, leucovorin has been shown to help, particularly with speech, getting kids to be more verbal than they were before." The National Institute of Health (NIH) was also granted $50 million in funding for 13 projects to help transform autism research through the proposed Autism Data Science Initiative.

In an April 2025 article, Scientific American estimated that two-thirds of the increase in autism was due to better diagnosis and the desire on the part of parents and schools to get started with early intervention. However, the article estimated that one-third was due to an actual increase from a variety of factors such as mothers in richer countries being older on average at childbirth, the ability to keep more premature children alive and healthy, and small-particle air pollution during the 3rd trimester which can cause an inflammatory response. In addition, Scientific American writes that “infections that are accompanied by fever in the second [2nd] trimester raise the risk of autism.”

=== Sex and gender ===
The administration "demanded that 46 states and territories remove all references" to LGBT+ people in sex ed and terminated California's grant. The administration also objected to policies that "normalizes, or promotes sexual activity for minors" in sexual education. The Centers for Medicare & Medicaid Services (CMS) finalized a rule that prohibits insurers from covering gender affirming care as an essential health benefit. CMS also sent a letter to state Medicaid directors on "Puberty blockers, cross-sex hormones, and surgery related to gender dysphoria" which notes that "longstanding federal Medicaid regulations prohibit federal funding for coverage of services whose purpose is to permanently render an individual incapable of reproducing" (intended to prevent forced sterilization). HHS tweeted that it had sent letters "to health care providers, risk managers, and state medical boards urging immediate updates to treatment protocols for minors with gender dysphoria based" on its May 1, 2025 gender dysphoria report. The administration subpoenaed doctors and clinics for patient data which Judge Jamal Whitehead described as intimidation that abused the judicial process. The Office of Personnel Management announced gender-affirming care will no longer be covered under the Federal Employees Health Benefits or Postal Service Health Benefits programs. The administration flipped from the Biden administration's position in United States v. Skrmetti. Executive Order 14235 excludes organizations that work with trans youth from Public Service Loan Forgiveness.

In December 2025, the administration proposed conditioning participation in Medicare and Medicaid on providers not providing gender-affirming care procedures on those under 18 years of age, with the same prohibition applying to Children's Health Insurance Program funding care for those under 19. Kennedy signed a declaration "that these procedures do not meet professionally recognized standards of health care. Under the declaration, practitioners who perform [such] procedures on minors would be deemed out of compliance with those standards." HHS moved to reverse the Biden administration’s actions to add gender dysphoria to the definition of disability under Section 504 of the Rehabilitation Act. In April 2026, Judge Mustafa T. Kasubhai vacated Kennedy's declaration. In July 2026, NPR reported that "an official document (...) shows" HHS "likely will not be finalizing" the December rule.

Mary Ziegler wrote that the administration was "launching the most serious effort in decades to curb contraception." The administration withheld tens of millions of dollars in Title X grants in April 2025 which it restored in January 2026 after a lawsuit. In 2025, the administration destroyed millions of dollars of contraceptives, arguing that contraceptives are abortifacient under its Mexico City Policy. The administration's 2027 Title X grant recipient guidance promoted fertility awareness while using the word contraception only once in a section called "reducing overmedicalization in health care".

== Housing ==
In July 2025, Trump signed Executive Order 14321 which orders "ending support for "housing first"". Trump worked to close the United States Interagency Council on Homelessness.

The Department of Housing and Urban Development has reportedly closed or halted hundreds of cases along with the revocation of settlements, "even when accusations of discrimination had been substantiated". The Office of Fair Housing and Equal Opportunity was reported to go from 22 to 6 lawyers with the office's work referred to as “not a priority of the administration". Since Trump took office, the office issued 4 charges of discrimination compared to an average of 35 a year. The administration reversed a rule put into place by the Biden administration to crack down on housing discrimination. Two lawyers where ousted after whistleblowing.

The administration was described as "abruptly" reversing its proposal to "overhaul" federal spending on homelessness before the proposal was blocked by Judge Mary S. McElroy.

== Labor ==
Trump signed Executive Order 14173 and worked to reduce the Federal Mediation and Conciliation Service.

== Military ==
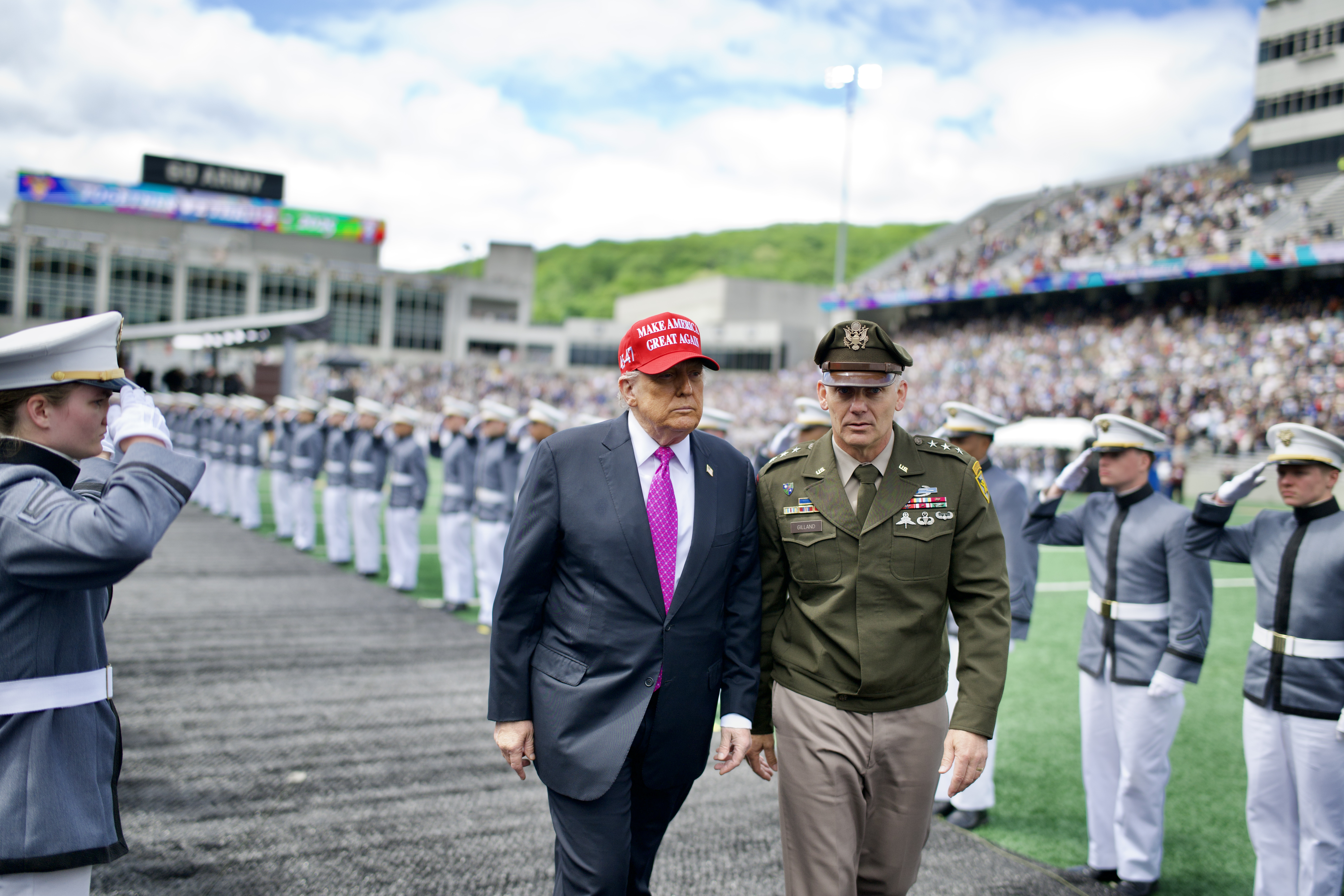
Trump at West Point on May 24, 2025

In November 2024, Trump's transition team was reportedly compiling a list of military officials involved in the withdrawal from Afghanistan, and investigating whether they could be court-martialed. They were also considering creating a commission to investigate the withdrawal, including whether some officials could be eligible for treason. During his campaign, Trump promised to use the military on American soil to fight "the enemy from within" which he described as "radical left lunatics" and Democratic politicians such as Adam Schiff. Upon taking office, Trump was described as politicizing the military and introducing culture war topics. Charles Q. Brown Jr., who was originally nominated by Trump, became the first African American to lead a branch of the United States Armed Forces. Trump abruptly dismissed Brown as Chairman of the Joint Chiefs of Staff on February 21, 2025. Trump subsequently announced that Brown would be replaced with John D. Caine. In January 2025, Trump signed Executive Order 14184 (Reinstating Service Members Discharged Under the Military's COVID-19 Vaccination Mandate).

Trump signed Executive Order 14167 and through a memorandum created the National Defense Area.

Trump signed Executive Order 14288 and domestic military deployments by the second Trump administration.

The military renamed multiple bases after Confederate soldiers against the Naming Commission created by Congress.

The administration terminated the Defense Department Advisory Committee on Women in the Services.

The administration decreased the separation of military and police roles.

In September 2025, Hegseth ordered service members from around the world to Quantico in what was described as a rant. During the speech, Hegseth endorsed the broken windows theory, described "fat generals and admirals" as "unacceptable", claimed that Inspector Generals (which is investigating Hegseth's use of Signal) and "Words like bullying and hazing" had been "weaponized", complained that "we lost our way. We became the woke department. But not anymore", declared "We're empowering drill sergeants to instill healthy fear in new recruits (...) And yes, they can put their hands on recruits. This does not mean they can be reckless or violate the law, but they can use tried and true methods to [head tilt] motivate new recruits", said "We all serve at the pleasure of the president every single day", "when civilian leaders issue lawful orders, we execute", the MEO and EEO will be overhauled, "No more identity months, DEI offices, dudes in dresses", anonymous social media accounts "must not be tolerated", we "don't fight with stupid rules of engagement", "Should our enemies choose foolishly to challenge us, they will be crushed by the violence, precision and ferocity of the War Department. In other words, to our enemies, FAFO", "To ensure peace, we must prepare for war", "You kill people and break things for a living. You are not politically correct and don't necessarily belong always in polite society", "You might say we're ending the war on warriors. I heard someone wrote a book about that", claimed "at my direction, we're making changes to the retention of adverse information on personnel records that will allow leaders with forgivable, earnest, or minor infractions to not be encumbered by those infractions in perpetuity" and concluded by discussing "our monthly Pentagon Christian prayer service". Hegseth also complained about time wasting, "we're giving you back real time. Less PowerPoint briefings and fewer online courses". Hegseth complained about "conformists", "No more beards, long hair, superficial individual expression". Hegseth's efforts have been criticized as targeting service members on the basis of race and religion.

Hegseth was described as unprecedentedly "Purging Military Leaders".

A 2025 coast guard directive stated "Potentially divisive symbols and flags include, but are not limited to, the following: a noose, a swastika, and any symbols or flags co-opted or adopted by hate-based groups as representations of supremacy, racial or religious intolerance, or other bias". Previously, these symbols where classified as “hate incidents”. Hours later, "leadership gave assurance that the public display of hateful symbols would continue to be banned".

Avatar of Donald J. Trump

Donald J. Trump
(@realDonaldTrump)
tweeted:

English:

SEDITIOUS BEHAVIOR, punishable by DEATH!

November 20, 2025

A November 2025 memo signed by Hegseth referred a review of Representative Mark Kelly for a video featuring Kelly, Elissa Slotkin, Jason Crow, Chrissy Houlahan Chris Deluzio Maggie Goodlander in which they call for service members to refuse illegal orders. The pentagon told multiple media outlets in December 2025 that its "preliminary review" was being escalated “to an official Command Investigation”.

In December 2025, Trump announced every soldier would be sent a $1,776 "warrior dividend" "Because of tariffs, along with the just passed One Big, Beautiful Bill". It was reported that the funding would actually come from military housing funding.

Hegseth prevented promotions for women and people of color.

As part of the One Big Beautiful Bill, the B21 Raider received increased funding to accelerate the program, the first operational model to be delivered in 2027.

== Religion ==
Trump's 2024 presidential campaign took on the symbols, rhetoric and agenda of Christian nationalism. He wove Christian religious imagery into his ideology, characterizing it as a "righteous crusade" against "atheists, globalists and the Marxists". Trump has been critical of what he has characterized as a persecution of Christians. On February 6, following the National Prayer Breakfast, he signed an executive order to create a task force to "immediately halt all forms of anti-Christian targeting and discrimination within the federal government, including at the DOJ, which was absolutely terrible, the IRS, the FBI — terrible — and other agencies." Trump appointed Attorney General Pam Bondi to lead the task force and appointed Paula White to direct the White House Faith Office.

As in Trump's first presidency, the administration weakened the Johnson Amendment. The administration intervened on behalf of the plaintiffs in a lawsuit against SB 5375 a Washington State law that makes members of clergy mandatory reporters of child abuse. Unlike in other states, SB 5375 also applies to what's shared during confession leading the administration to claim the law infringed on religious freedom.

Donald Trump was inaugurated as president on 20 January 2025. On 23 January 2025, Trump pardoned 23 convicted under the FACE Act. A memo dated 24 January 2025 says "future abortion-related FACE Act prosecutions and civil actions will be permitted only in extraordinary circumstances".

In September 2025, the administration sued protesters of an event at a Synagogue in West Orange, New Jersey, under the FACE Act, alleging the "actions were intended to interfere with the synagogue community’s right to freely exercise their religion". The event was a real estate fair for property in the State of Israel and in Israeli settlements.

In February 2026, the administration charged 39 including Nekima Levy Armstrong, Don Lemon, and Georgia Fort under the FACE Act for a protest at Cities Church during Operation Metro Surge. Reportedly, David Easterwood the acting field director of the Saint Paul, Minnesota, ICE field office is a pastor at the church.

In April 2026 the Justice Department issued a report accusing the Biden administration of weaponizing the FACE ACT against anti-abortion activists. The report is a project of the "Weaponization Working Group."

== Science ==
In response to executive orders, there were freezes in scientific funding and purges of data related to LGBTQ issues, gender, climate change, and racial diversity. There were also mass firings across federal scientific agencies. The National Science Foundation (NSF) ceased paying out grants to researchers. After a court order on February 2, the NSF funds were unfrozen. On February 4, 2025, the NSF announced that it would lay off 25% to 50% of its workforce.

The Trump administration ordered a suspension of National Institutes of Health (NIH) grant funding on January 27. The order was blocked by courts after legal challenges but continued when the government exploited a loophole in which they refused to publish the agency's meeting plans in the Federal Register. The NIH announced on February 7 that it would cap support for indirect costs in grants to institutions at 15% of a grant's value. Indirect costs cover expenses that are not directly related to research but are necessary to support it, such as rent for facilities, utilities like heat and electricity, or janitorial and administrative staff. Indirect costs typically range from 30% to 70%, and the cuts represent "tens to hundreds of millions of dollars" in lost funding for research institutes. In response, 22 state attorneys general filed a lawsuit and the cuts were paused on February 10. The cuts have led to universities pausing or reducing admissions for graduate biomedical research and medical school programs and hiring of postdoctoral researchers. Reports in mid-March stated that the NIH was expected to fire 3,400 to 5,000 people from its 20,000 person workforce.

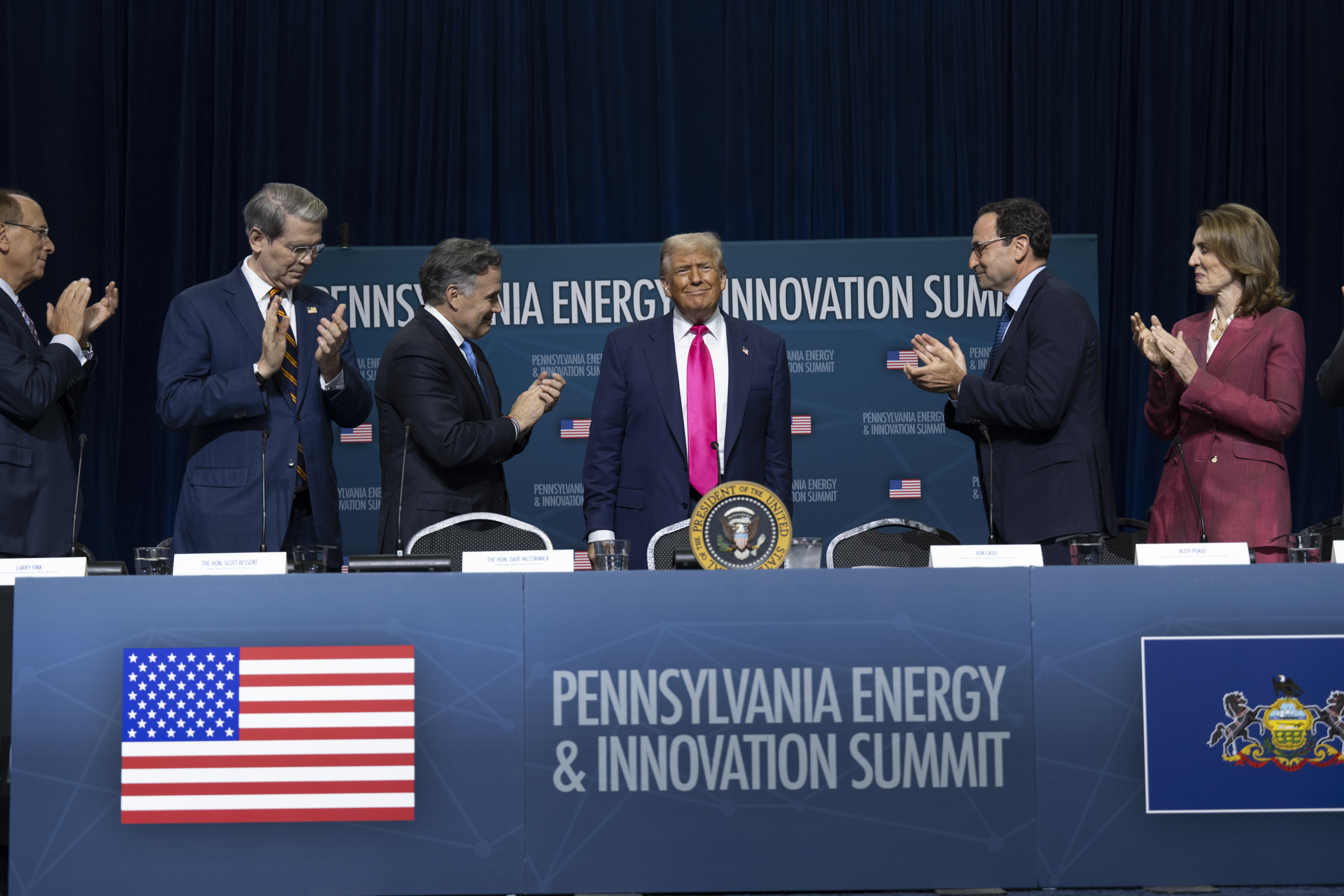
Trump at the Pennsylvania Energy and Innovation Summit, July 16, 2025

The Centers for Disease Control's (CDC) social vulnerability index and environmental justice index, which measured disparities in health risks, were removed from the organization's website, and on January 31, the data portal was taken completely offline in response to Executive Order 14168, which mandated that federal agencies use "sex" instead of "gender" and that they only recognize male and female sexes. Census web pages about sexual identity and orientation were taken offline, and CDC pages about HIV and LGBTQ+ youth also disappeared. About 750 CDC employees were fired over the weekend of February 15 with leadership stating that 10% (1,300) would be notified of their termination. The Food and Drug Administration purged online material on clinical trial diversity that encouraged drug developers to test the effects of medical treatments on different populations. After a court order, many web pages were restored. The administration added a disclaimer to the restored websites that notes the administrations opposition to what it terms "gender ideology", claiming it is "inaccurate".

Layoffs at the National Oceanic and Atmospheric Administration (NOAA) began on February 27, 2025, when 880 employees (approximately 5% of the organization) were fired. In some cases, the government attempted to rehire scientists. Members of the technical staff at the Department of Energy's National Nuclear Security Administration, which oversees the nuclear arsenal, were fired on February 13; attempts to contact them for rehiring failed because their emails had been disconnected. The Department of Agriculture fired several scientists working on the ongoing avian flu outbreak over the same weekend and attempted to rehire them. Members of the CDC's Epidemic Intelligence Service were told their positions were eliminated, but the decision was reversed after an outcry.

== Social programs ==
=== Assistance programs ===
The administration has looked to end the Low Income Home Energy Assistance Program and the HOME Investment Partnerships Program.

On December 31, 2025, the Trump Administration announced it would be freezing child care funds to all fifty states; according to an official within the Department of Health and Human Services, the funds would only be released "when states prove they are being spent legitimately." The move came after unverified video was released by conservative influencer Nick Shirley, who claimed the footage proved child care fraud within Somali communities in the Minnesota city of Minneapolis. Minnesota officials disputed Shirley's allegations.

=== Social Security ===
On March 18, 2025, the Social Security Administration said that they would be implementing tighter identity verification requirements starting March 31. On March 26, the implementation date was pushed to April 14. The policy requires individuals to appear in-person at a field office when applying for retirement benefits, survivors benefits, or auxiliary benefits if they are unable to apply online, removing the option to verify identity by telephone. Applications for SSDI, Medicare, or SSI are exempted from in-person verification requirements, along with benefits applicants subject to extreme situations "such as terminal cases or prisoner pre-release scenarios." This new policy comes at a time the Trump administration is closing some field offices and laying off some Social Security employees.

In late March, Wired reported that DOGE is putting together a team to migrate the Social Security base code from COBOL to a more modern programming language, with the goal of achieving this in a matter of months, whereas most experts say it should take several years to do and test this safely. It was reported in mid-April that the Trump administration had placed on the "Master Death File", renamed the "Master Ineligible File", more than 6,000 legal immigrants whom officials claimed were either on a terrorism watch list or had an FBI criminal record. However, the White House did not provide evidence for this claim.

In late April, District Judge Ellen Hollander halted DOGE access to individual Social Security records citing privacy law. The Appeals Court for the 4th Circuit decided not to lift this injunction. In early May, the Trump administration appealed this case to the Supreme Court.

Social Security will "clawback" money from a disabled or retired person's monthly payments in cases in which overpayments are discovered. Overpayments can either be the fault of Social Security or of the recipient, for example, a person on SSDI disability not reporting monthly work income over a certain amount. The Biden administration had capped the clawback rate at 10%, but this expired on March 27, 2025, and the clawback rate reverted to 100%. On April 25, the Trump administration reduced this clawback rate to 50%.

ProPublica reported that the administration was "working on a rule change that would deduct the value of a disabled adult’s bedroom from their SSI allotment" impacting as many as 400,000 people.

=== Food ===
Secretary of Agriculture Brooke Rollins in December 2025, As Joe Biden was working to buy an election a year ago, he increased food stamp program funding by 40 percent. So now as we continue to roll that back

The administration cut over $1 billion that had gone to food support programs including the Emergency Food Assistance Program.

==== SNAP ====
During the 2025 shutdown, the administration refused to fund SNAP. After a lower court ruled that SNAP be funded, the administration asked that the supreme court freeze lower court rulings requiring it to disburse the funds, which the court did via the shadow docket. After states worked to provide benefits, the administration told the states to “immediately undo” such actions.

== Transportation ==
Secretary of Transportation Sean Duffy in January 2025 threatened to block transportation funding to sanctuary cities. Duffy cut federal funding for the Texas Central Railway in April 2025 and California High-Speed Rail in June 2025. In September 2025, the administration canceled grants for street safety measures, pedestrian trails, and bike lanes, calling the projects "hostile to motor vehicles. The administration submitted proposals in November 2025 to eliminate the mass transit account in the Highway Trust Fund and divert its funds towards highway construction, prohibit the Federal Highway Administration from providing funding for public transit projects, and prohibit states from spending federal highway funds on public transit.

== Voting ==
The second Trump administration has issued executive orders and other presidential directives instituting federal department and agency actions that have impacted election administration by state governments, federal election security and campaign finance agencies, and offices within the U.S. Justice Department for enforcing voting rights protections. The administration's actions on election law and voting rights have occurred alongside the administration's targeting of political opponents and Republican Party efforts to disrupt voting after the 2024 presidential election. Election lawyers at the Brennan Center for Justice and Democracy Docket have described the administration's actions as election subversion, while surveys of U.S. political scientists conducted after Trump returned to office have found a consensus that the United States is transitioning towards illiberal democracy and competitive authoritarianism.

== See also ==
- Bibliography of Donald Trump
- First presidency of Donald Trump – 2017–2021 U.S. presidential administration
- List of United States presidential vetoes § Donald Trump
- Political positions of Donald Trump
