= Separation of military and police roles =

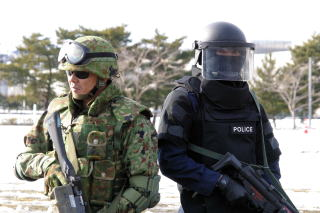
Riot police officer and JGSDF soldier

The separation of military and police roles is the concept by which the military and law enforcement agency perform distinct duties and do not interfere with each other's areas of responsibility. The military’s role generally involves national defense and combat operations, while law enforcement focuses on enforcing domestic law. Neither is trained specifically to do the other's job. Military and law enforcement generally differ in areas such as source of authority, training in use of force, training in investigation and prosecution, and training in enforcing laws and ensuring civil liberties.

Even "gray area" threats, such as drug trafficking, organized crime, or terrorism, often require investigative skills, adherence to legal procedures, and coordination with prosecutorial and judicial authorities, which are areas of specialization for law enforcement officers. Military personnel, in contrast, are trained to defend national territory from foreign military threats, and their equipment and training focus on combat operations rather than law enforcement procedures. The presence of a heavily armed military standing in for the law enforcement personnel may reassure anxious civilians or not, but it should at best be partial and short-term.

== In the United States ==
In the United States, the 1878 Posse Comitatus Act places limits on (but does not absolutely forbid) the federal government in dispatching federal military personnel and federalized National Guard forces to enforce domestic policies.

There are instances of the military being called into action (such as during national emergencies caused by natural disasters or civil disorders) and efficiently saving lives and restoring order, such as the 1992 Los Angeles riots and Hurricane Katrina. On the other hand, there have also been instances where the use of military in a domestic role has gone wrong, such as the Kent State shootings.

The Military Cooperation with Civilian Law Enforcement Agencies Act is a United States federal law enacted in 1981 that allows the United States Armed Forces to cooperate with domestic and foreign law enforcement agencies. Operations in support of law enforcement include assistance in counterdrug operations, assistance for civil disturbances, special security operations, counter-terrorism, explosive ordnance disposal (EOD), and similar activities. Constitutional and statutory restrictions and corresponding directives and regulations limit the type of support provided in this area. The legislation allows the U.S. military to give law enforcement agencies access to its military bases and its military equipment.

An increased militarization of the police has been observed, most notably through the 1990 establishment and growth of the Law Enforcement Support Office, or LESO, under the administration of George H. W. Bush. This legally mandates the transfer of excess DoD property to law enforcement agencies. Established under the broad guidelines of fighting drugs, it has enabled police officers to use military weapons, equipment, and vehicles in almost any cases.

== France ==
In France, the Maréchaussée was a military organization used to police rural areas. During the revolutionary period it was reorganized as the National Gendarmerie, which still exists today as a branch of the armed forces with responsibility for policing rural areas. Other countries have adopted gendarmeries on the French model, often due to French influence.

Since the Charlie Hebdo shootings, military law enforcement became commonplace under the Vigipirate plan that allowed the deployment of 3000 soldiers at first up to 11,000 to conduct patrols in French Streets against terrorist attacks, notably against the designated Islamist threat.

== Belgium ==
In Belgium, Operation Vigilant Guardian was a deployment of soldiers for security in the capital following the Charlie Hebdo shooting and the dismantling of a terrorist cell in Verviers. The mission ended in 2021.

== Sweden ==
The Ådalen shootings were a series of events in and around the sawmill district of Ådalen, Kramfors Municipality, Ångermanland, Sweden, in May 1931. During a protest on 14 May, five people were killed by bullets fired by Swedish military personnel called in as reinforcements by the police.

== See also ==
- Martial law
- Militarization of police - the use of military equipment and tactics by law enforcement officers
- Military aid to the civil power - the use of the armed forces in support of the civil authorities of a state
- Military police - military organizations with law enforcement powers
- Posse comitatus - a group of people mobilized to suppress lawlessness or defend the county
- List of sovereign states without armed forces
