= Operation Vigilant Guardian =

Belgian anti-terrorism military operation

Operation Vigilant Guardian was a Belgian army operation following the January 2015 Île-de-France attacks and the dismantling of a terrorist cell in Verviers having foiled imminent attacks, to deal with the terrorist threat and protect the "points" sensitive territory. The operation was put in place 16 January 2015 and ended on 1 April 2021.

The operation, originally codenamed Homeland, was significantly strengthened during the 2015, after the attacks of 13 November, notably through the implementation of absolute emergency in the Brussels area from 21 to 26 November 2015 and after the attacks of 22 March 2016 in Brussels.

After the 2023 Brussels attack, Belgium’s crisis center urged continued vigilance on 17 October and said there would be "increased and visible police presence".

The deployment of soldiers in the streets in Belgium was an unprecedented event since World War II and a number of violent events in the 1980s.

== Objectives ==
This military operation, in collaboration with the police, decided by the Belgian government, aims to secure "sensitive" locations to deal with the terrorist threat in crowded public places (stations, shopping centers, squares), places of worship, transportation (subways, trains, stations, airports), government institutions (European institutions, embassies, parliaments), schools, universities, hospitals, ports, nuclear power plants, and international borders.

== Forces engaged ==
At the beginning of the operation only 150 military members were mobilized, the number of personnel steadily increased to reach the figure of 1,828 soldiers mobilized by October 2016.

== Transaction costs ==
For the year 2015 (beginning of the operation Saturday, January 17, 2015), the cost of deployment of the military in street amounted to 17.15 million euros. In 2016, only for the first trismestre, the cost was 12.01 million. For the second quarter, specifically from 1 st April to 2 July, the amount is expected to reach 22.05 million euros, according to government estimates. The rising costs of Operation Vigilant Guardian is explained, according to the Interior Ministry, the fact that the number of personnel has increased steadily since 2015.

== Incidents ==
June 20, 2017, a man entered the enclosure of the Brussels Central Station and tried to perpetrate a terrorist attack. The perpetrator, called Osama Z, was killed by soldiers mobilizing as part of Operation Vigilant Guardian, thwarting an attack.

That was the first time since the Second World War that a soldier killed someone within the territory of Belgium.

On 26 August 2017, a man was shot in the center of Brussels on the Boulevard Émile Jacqmain, after attacking a military patrol with a knife, wounding one of the soldiers. The federal prosecutor called the attack terrorist aggression. It was claimed the next day by the Islamic State. A few days after the attack on 28 August 2017, the General Staff of the army Marc Thys, announced that the military will continue their patrols on the street, at least until 2021.

On 26 August 2022 Belgium's terrorism tracking Coordination Unit for Threat Analysis (OCAM) briefly raised the threat level in Brussels from "medium" to "serious", after a vehicle rammed into an outdoor cafe, injuring several people. The perpetrator was caught and arrested in Antwerp later that day. The level was dropped back to medium a few hours later after officials found "reassuring elements in their investigation".

On 16 October 2023, the Belgian authorities heightened the threat level for the Brussels-Capital region to its highest level of 4, after the 2023 Brussels attack the same day. This is the highest level since August 2022.

== Foreign equivalent ==
The Vigilant Guardian transaction is directly inspired by the French military operation called Operation Sentinel implementation in the hexagon after the wave of attacks that hit France in January 2015.

- Operation Temperer is the British Army equivalent operation.
- Operation Banner was the British Armed Forces' operation in Northern Ireland from August 1969 to July 2007, as part of the Troubles.
