= National Defense Area =

U.S. military installation designation

National Defense Areas
- Location of National Defense Areas

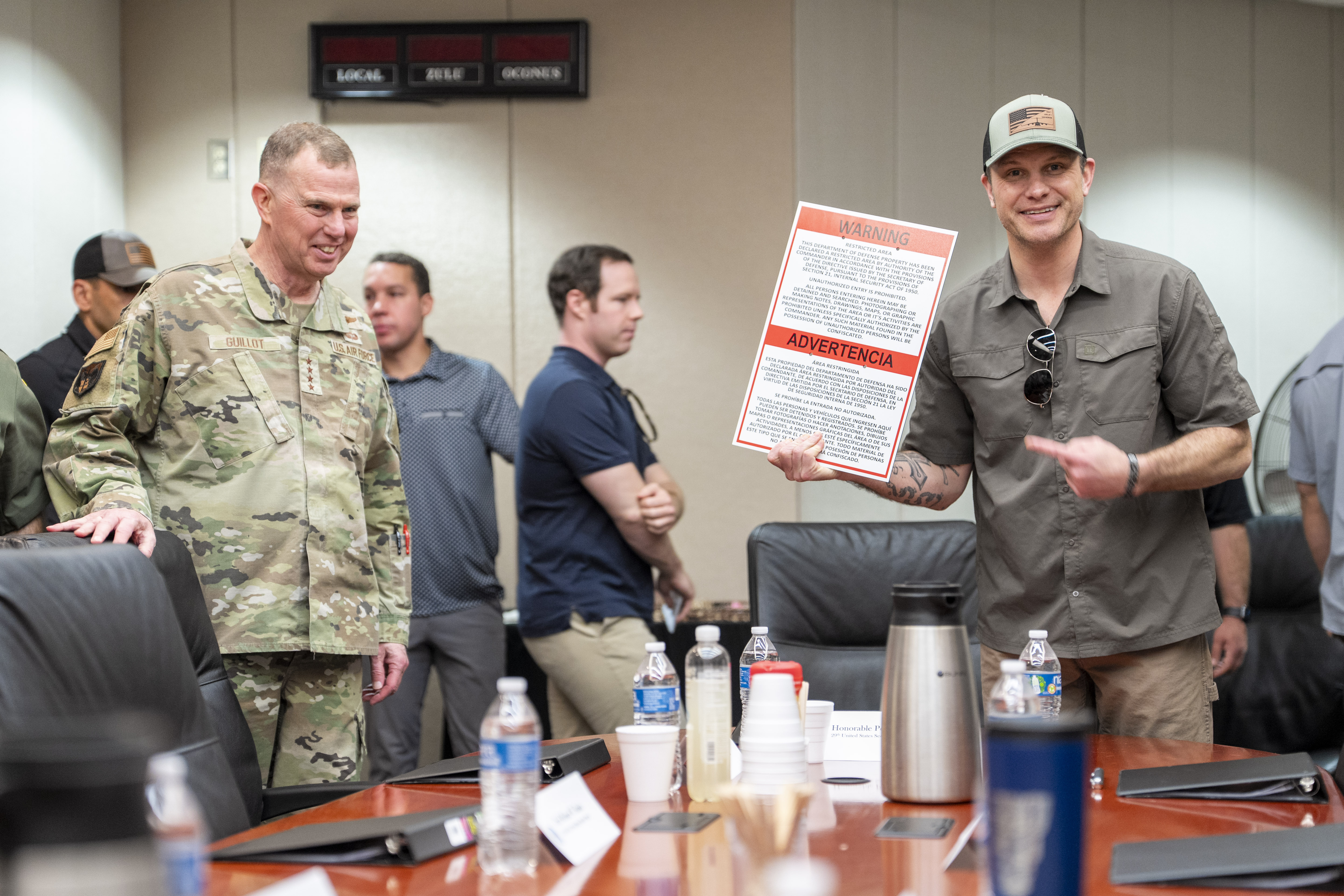
- Secretary of Defense Pete Hegseth at a National Defense Area holding a sign which says that the area is restricted

Garrison information
- Occupants: Department of Defense

National Defense Areas (NDAs) are military installations designated by the second Trump administration at the Mexico–United States border which are operated by the US Department of Defense, where troops can search and detain.

By declaring a national emergency at the Southern Border of the United States in 2025, the administration has been able to circumvent restrictions on domestic military deployments through the Posse Comitatus Act and congressional approval. The administration is also less constrained by environmental law as it rolls back environmental protection.

== Background ==
Joint Task Force-Southern Border assumed control of the southern border mission from Joint Task Force North on March 14, 2025. The southern border mission is supported by thousands of service members as part of the expanded role of the pentagon in the Trump administration's border priorities.

== Creation ==
Executive Order 14167

NSPM-4

The creation of these NDAs was outlined in a National Security Presidential Memorandum (NSPM-4) issued on April 11, 2025, titled "Military Mission for Sealing the Southern Border of the United States and Repelling Invasions." The memorandum provides for the Department of Defense to take jurisdiction over lands reasonably necessary to enable military activities, including border-barrier construction and emplacement of detection and monitoring equipment to implement Executive Order 14167.

== Designated sites ==
The first zone, the New Mexico National Defense Area as part of Fort Huachuca. A second National Defense Area, The Texas National Defense Area (TXNDA), was announced as part of Fort Bliss. NDA 3 covering approximately 250 miles of the Rio Grande River in Cameron and Hidalgo County, Texas was announced which will be administered as part of Joint Base San Antonio. In February 2026, the U.S. Air Force announced that they would be adding an additional 40 miles from the end of NDA 3 to Roma, Texas extending the NDA. NDA 4 was established as part of Marine Corps Air Station Yuma. In December 2025, the Interior Department announced it would transfer roughly 760 acres of public land in San Diego County and Imperial County. The Air Force also added NDA 6 running from Falcon Dam to Del Rio and it would also be administered by Joint Base San Antonio.

== Timeline ==
The establishment of NDAs is authorized under existing laws, specifically 50 U.S.C. § 797 and 18 U.S.C. § 1382. These laws allow military personnel to remove trespassers from military installations. In May 2025, Federal judge Gregory B. Wormuth dismissed charges against 100 people on account that "migrants couldn't know they were trespassing".

Beginning in January 2026, the U.S. Northern Command has been sending troops to the border under Operation Ardent Vanguard.

As of March 2026, the military had made 68 apprehensions, with the majority of detentions being made by the Department of Homeland Security.

At least 4,700 people were accused of trespassing on the NDAs, "About 60% were dropped or dismissed". Judges have found that the defendants lacked mens rea because the alleged trespassers did not know they were entering a military installation.

The government would often would bring both immigration and trespass charges. A judge would separate the two charges and people would plead guilty to illegal entry, after which the government would drop the trespass charges. A spokesperson said the prosecutions had "proven to be a significant deterrent to both illegal crossings and cartel activity along the border".

In August 2026, the Office of Legal Counsel released an opinion which concluded that "when the law is violated within a military reservation, the same underlying rationale permits military personnel to engage in at least some law-enforcement activities outside of that military reservation." The opinion argues that such "law-enforcement activities" are not prohibited by the Posse Comitatus Act.

== Border communities ==
Border communities have been impacted by the NDAs.

== Tactics ==
In January 2026, military units in NDA 3 began using Seasats Lightfish autonomous surface vehicles to monitor border crossings.

== See also ==
- 2026 Texas and New Mexico airspace closures
- Domestic policy of the second Trump administration
