= Call Brussels =

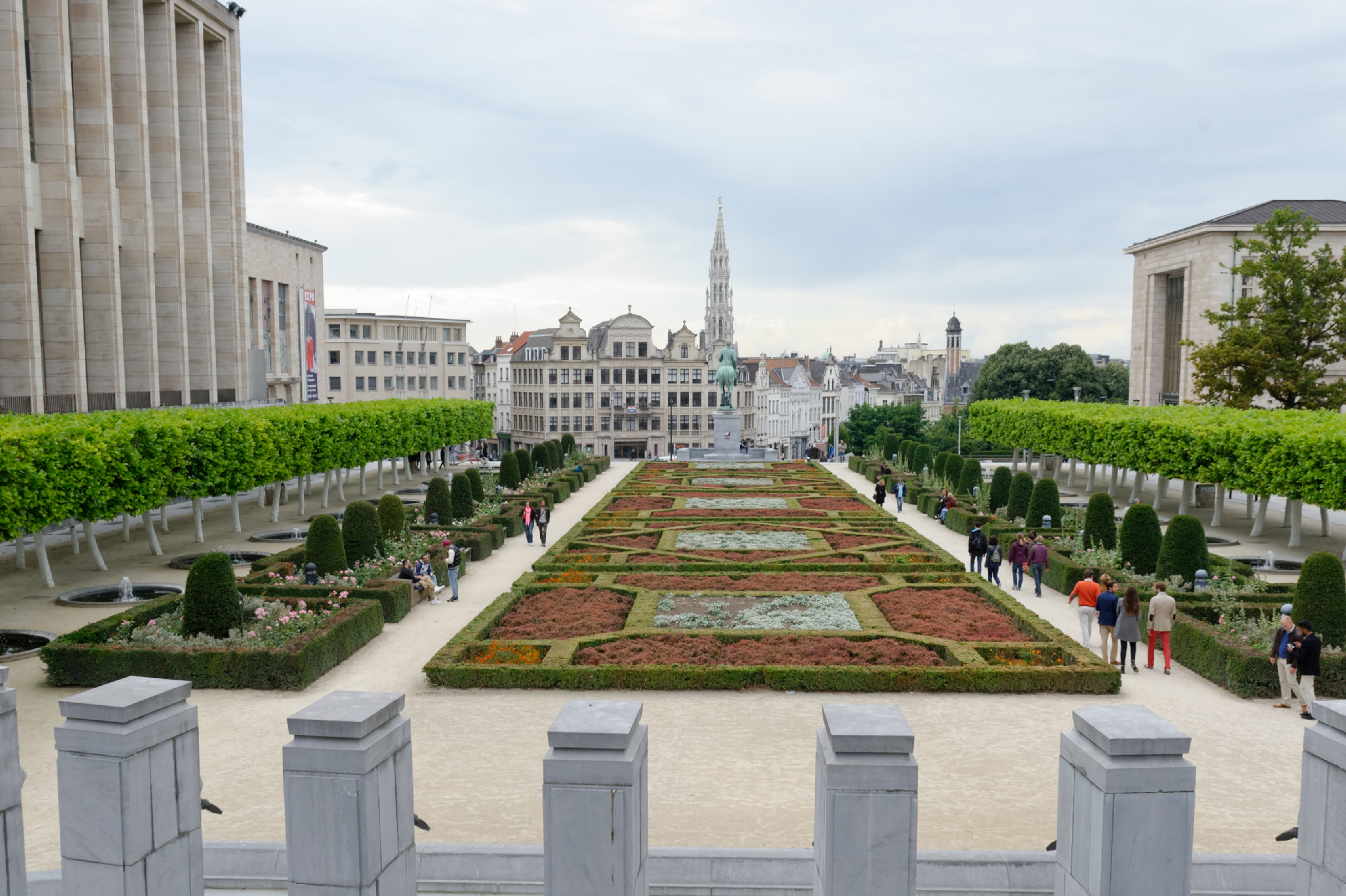
One of the public telephones was located at the Mont des Arts/Kunstberg

Call Brussels, also known by its hashtag #CallBrussels, was an initiative by which people from around the world could dial public telephones in the Belgian capital Brussels, which were then answered by locals. It was initiated in January 2016 by Belgian tourist organisations to counter negative coverage of the city in relation to Islamist militants based within it. The official video of the initiative was pulled from YouTube after March 2016's Brussels attacks.

== Description ==
After the November 2015 Paris attacks, several people from the Brussels neighbourhood of Molenbeek were arrested in connection to it, following a four-day lockdown across the capital. The lockdown cost the city €350 million, while tourist numbers in December 2015 fell 20% on the previous December. The Call Brussels website said "At the moment, many tourists still hesitate about coming to visit our magnificent capital. The Level 4 alert and lockdown are still fresh in their memory. Which is a pity because for those who live in Brussels, everything is normal in the city..."

Via an Internet connection, members of the public could ring one of three public phones, at the Mont des Arts/Kunstberg, the Place Eugène Flagey/Eugène Flageyplein and in Molenbeek. Calls were answered from 7 to 11 January 2016. After the calls ended, a video was compiled of them by Visit Brussels, including one in which a Belgian man says "Well actually it's the media that's made a whole fuss about it, but nothing is happening." The video was pulled after the 22 March Brussels attacks.
