= 2015 Verviers police raid =

Belgian anti-terrorism police raid

- Part of Islamic terrorism in Europe
- Location of the province of Liège within Belgium
- Location: 50°35′23″N 5°51′47″E; Verviers, Liège, Belgium
- Date: 15 January 2015
- Attack type: Police raid
- Deaths: 2 suspects
- Injuries: 1 suspect

On 15 January 2015, Belgian police carried out a raid on premises in Verviers, Belgium. According to news sources, the raids were an anti-terrorist operation against Islamist radicals.

== Operations ==
Two suspects died in the raids, which involved heavy gunfire, with a third being seriously wounded.

Other operations were carried out in Brussels and the nearby municipalities of Schaerbeek, Molenbeek-Saint-Jean, Vilvoorde, and Zaventem. An armed man was reported to have been arrested in Brussels.

The Belgian prosecutor's office stated that the raids were an operation against a jihadist terrorist cell, reportedly believed to have links to ISIS, on the verge of committing a terrorist attack.

Police are investigating the possibility of links to the Charlie Hebdo shooting in neighbouring France. The men killed in the raid, Redouane Hagaoui and Tarik Jadaoun, were alleged by police to have been planning to attack sellers of the "survivors' issue" of Charlie Hebdo released following the attack in Paris.

== Response ==
On 17 January 2015, the Belgian government began a deployment of troops throughout Belgium to defend potential terrorist targets, Operation Vigilant Guardian.

== Verviers terror cell trial ==
A trial against 16 members of the terrorist cell dismantled in Verviers began in 2016. Nine of the defendants were still at large and tried in absentia, including two Belgian, five French, one Moroccan and one Dutch national, who were thought to be fighting for the ISIL in Syria, to be in hiding or to be deceased. Belgian police said the group was on the verge of a coordinated attack of killing police officers in public roads and in police stations, and police had found "Kalashnikov assault rifles, explosives, ammunition and communications equipment – along with police uniforms that could have been used for the plot" during the raids.

The cell was found to have been led by Abdelhamid Abaaoud via telephone from Athens, who evaded capture in the Greek capital. A member of the Brussels ISIL terror cell, he later had a leading role in the November 2015 Paris attacks.

In 2016, members of the cell were sentenced to between 8 and 16 years imprisonment.

== See also ==
- 2015 Saint-Denis raid
- 2015 Thalys train attack
- 2015 Brussels lockdown
- 2016 Brussels bombings
- Jewish Museum of Belgium shooting (2014)
- Terrorism in the European Union
