= United States Department of Defense Military Equal Opportunity Program =

The United States Department of Defense Military Equal Opportunity (MEO) Program is the equal employment opportunity program of the United States Department of Defense. It prohibits unlawful discrimination on the basis of "race, color, national origin, religion, sex (including gender identity), or sexual orientation."
