= 2015 Brussels lockdown =

Belgium government lockdown due to terrorism

- Part of the aftermath of the November 2015 Paris attacks
- Location of Brussels within Belgium
- Type: Lockdown
- Location: Brussels, Belgium
- Objective: Prevention of an imminent Paris-style attack and capture of fugitive Salah Abdeslam
- Date: 21–25 November 2015

From 21 to 25 November 2015, the government of Belgium imposed a security lockdown on Brussels, including the closure of shops, schools, public transportation, due to information about potential terrorist attacks in the wake of the series of coordinated terrorist attacks in Paris by Islamic State of Iraq and the Levant on 13 November. One of the perpetrators of the attack, Belgian-born French national Salah Abdeslam, was thought to be hiding in the city. As a result of warnings of a serious and imminent threat, the terror alert level was raised to the highest level (four) across the Brussels metropolitan area, and people were advised not to congregate publicly, effectively putting the city under lockdown.

== Impact ==
On the first day of the lockdown, Haaretz described, "an atmosphere of war. Army convoys passed through the streets. Armored cars were posted at central points, outside the royal palace, and at underground railway stations." Police requested a social media blackout to prevent disclosure of police operations. Twitter users responded with cat pictures (a reference to security level Four, or in French, quatre pronounced cat).

On 23 November, the third day of the lockdown, all schools and universities remained closed along with the Metro. Prime Minister Charles Michel announced that the lockdown measures would stay in place, "for at least another week. But schools and the metro can be reopened gradually from Wednesday."

The lockdown caused disruption to major institutions and organizations headquartered in the city, such as NATO, which removed all non-essential personnel on 23 November, and the European Union, which opened on Monday with reinforced security measures. Belgium's biggest bank KBC Bank entirely closed its headquarters on Monday.

As the lockdown continued into its third day, the BBC described the city as having "come to a standstill." After 5 days, the lockdown was lifted on 25 November, schools reopened and the metro resumed service but some stores remained closed. Like Paris, which saw a drop in tourism, Brussels saw an immediate drop in visitors and an increase in last minute hotel cancellations. Some shops, cafes and hotels that remained open reported 90% to 100% drop in business.

=== Costs ===
The lockdown is estimated to have cost €51.7 million per day, counting both the outlay on security and lost business income. Belgium is also facing a demand from the police for a budgetary increment of €100 million to cover ongoing increases in costs due to the terrorism threat.

The total cost was estimated at €350 million, and tourist numbers in December 2015 were down 20% on the previous December. In January, in order to restore the city's reputation after the lockdown, Visit Brussels launched an initiative Call Brussels in which members of the public could call public telephones in the city via their computer.

== Arrests and charges ==
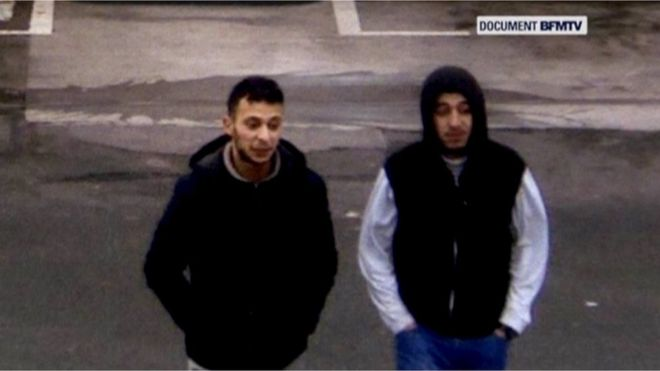
Salah Abdeslam (L) and Hamza Attou (R) captured on CCTV at a French petrol station hours after the attacks.

A reported 1,000 police officers were involved in the search for Salah Abdeslam. Over the weekend police conducted at least 20 raids around the city and nearby areas, making 16 arrests but releasing 15 of these people. Belgium's federal prosecutor's office said 23 November that a man had been charged with involvement in the Paris terrorist attacks and for membership of a terrorist organization. On Monday 21 more arrests were made, with 17 released.

On 24 November, evening prosecutors announced terrorism charges had been filed against four men:

- Hamza Attou and Mohammed Amri. Lawyers for these two men said they had admitted driving Salah Abdeslam from Paris to Brussels after the Paris attacks but said they had nothing to do with the attacks.
- "Ali O.", a 31-year-old French national who lived in Molenbeek neighborhood of Brussels.
- "Lazez A.", a 39-year-old Moroccan also from Molenbeek arrested on 19 November. Two pistols and traces of blood were found in his car.

== Aftermath ==
King Philippe of Belgium addressed the Brussels lockdown and Paris attack in his annual Christmas Address. He said during his speech, "My special thanks go to all those who have fought for it and continue to work to ensure our safety, to identify the perpetrators of these attacks and to prevent new ones. These events have shown how important it is to invest in the judiciary, police, army and intelligence services. I also want to thank you all, and especially the people of Brussels, for your dignified and responsible behavior during this difficult time."

== Precedents ==
Extended lockdowns of entire urban areas because of terrorism have been rare; the European Union called the Brussels lockdown "unprecedented". The extent of the lockdown went well beyond measures taken the last time Belgium declared a level four alert in 2007. One previous example of a citywide lockdown was the one-day lockdown of Boston in April 2013 as police hunted for the Islamist terrorists responsible for the Boston Marathon bombing.

== See also ==
- January 2015 anti-terrorism operations in Belgium
- 2015 Saint-Denis raid
- 2016 Brussels bombings
- Brussels ISIL terror cell
