= 2025 United States federal government shutdown =

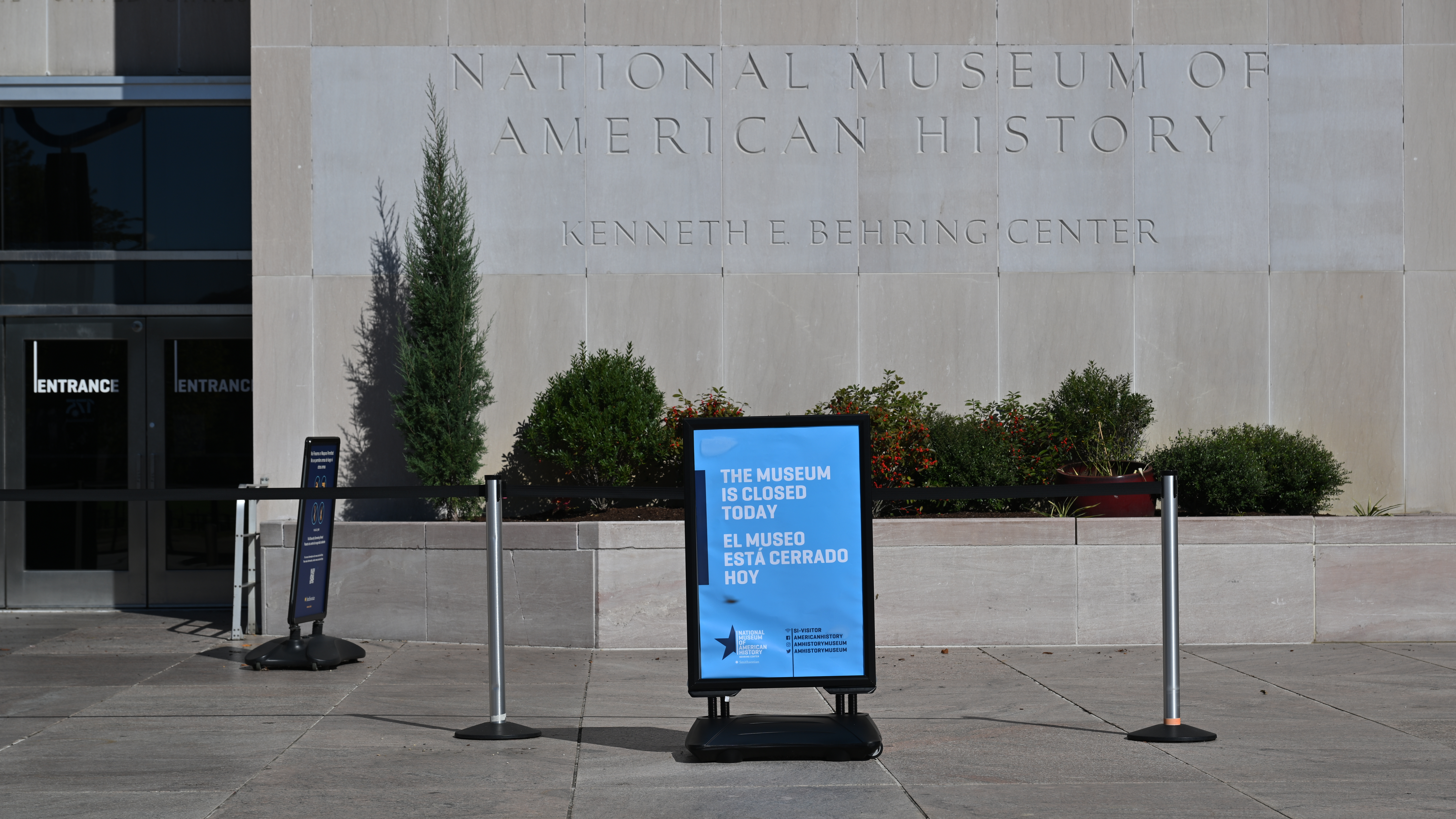
- The National Museum of American History in October 2025. It was among several government institutions that closed due to the shutdown.
- Date: October 1 – November 12, 2025 (43 days)
- Cause: Expiration of continuing resolution from Full-Year Continuing Appropriations and Extensions Act, 2025
- Agencies affected: All
- Employees furloughed: ~900,000

From October 1 to November 12, 2025, the federal government of the United States was shut down as Congress failed to pass appropriations legislation for the 2026 fiscal year. The Republican-controlled House of Representatives advanced a continuing resolution, but Senate Democrats repeatedly blocked it. The legislation failed 14 times before a revised appropriations bill was passed on November 10. The House of Representatives passed the Senate's revised bill on November 12, which President Donald Trump signed that day. The shutdown was the 11th government shutdown that resulted in federal employees being furloughed and the longest full government shutdown in U.S. history, lasting 43 days.

Democrats in the Senate and the House opposed the Republican appropriations bill because it did not include an extension of expanded Affordable Care Act subsidies that were scheduled to expire in November 2025. (Note: Attributed to multiple sources:) The bipartisan agreement that ended the shutdown put the matter up to a vote in December.

The shutdown resulted in the furlough of roughly 900,000 federal employees and kept another two million working without pay. Some government programs such as Medicare and Medicaid continued to operate through the shutdown, as did certain agencies such as the Department of Defense and the Transportation Security Administration. Other agencies' operations were partially or fully suspended, including the National Institutes of Health and the Centers for Disease Control and Prevention.

== Background ==
=== Government funding procedure and fiscal authority ===
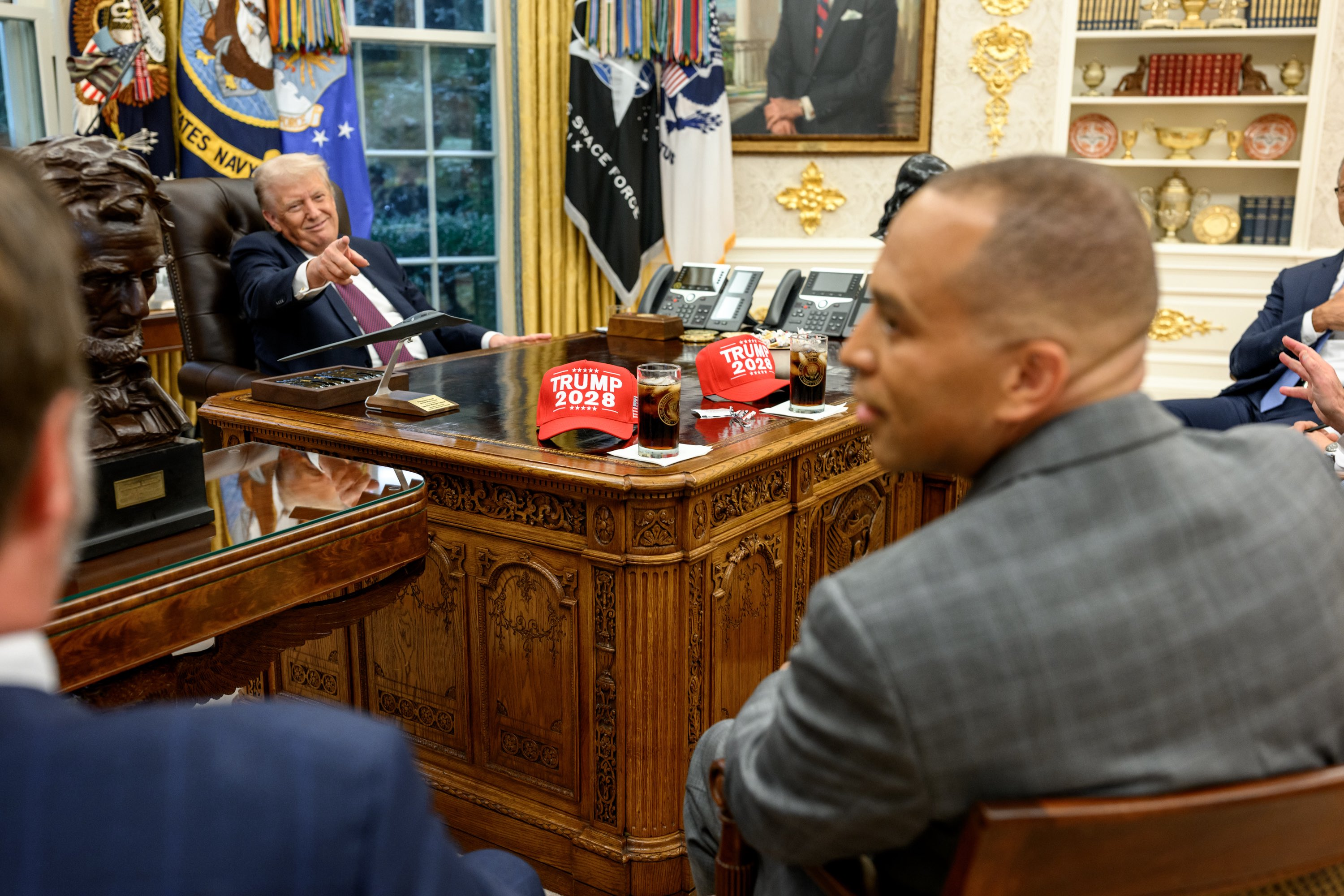
On September 30, 2025, President Donald Trump and congressional leaders held discussions that failed to avert a shutdown.

Article One of the United States Constitution vests the U.S. Congress with the authority to appropriate funds drawn from the Treasury. Since 1977, the federal budget process has used a fiscal year that runs from October 1 to September 30 of the following year, with 12 individual spending bills that must be passed. Political polarization has affected this process, often forcing lawmakers to pass continuing resolutions to temporarily fund the government.

The failure of Congress to agree on funding legislation leads to a government shutdown when the previous funding term ends. In a government shutdown, federal agencies continue work categorized as "essential", but federal employees and contractors are furloughed and not immediately paid. The authority to determine the work that continues is vested in the director of the Office of Management and Budget, although the president has broad authority over this process.

=== Earlier budget impasse ===
Ahead of a lapse of government funding expected to occur in March 2025, Democrats in Congress largely objected to funding the government as President Donald Trump moved to assume control of the extent of its operations, including eliminating federal funding and dismissing government workers. Hours before the deadline, Senate minority leader Chuck Schumer announced that he would support a continuing resolution to fund the government through September, arguing that Trump's efforts were being halted in the courts—which could be impeded by a shutdown; that a shutdown would give greater authority to the Department of Government Efficiency (DOGE); and that market uncertainty would mount over a shutdown in addition to imminent widespread tariffs, causing ambiguity over the responsibility of economic fear. Schumer's support incited other Democrats to vote in favor of a temporary continuing resolution proposed by Republicans, allowing the measure to pass and averting a shutdown. Schumer was criticized by several Democrats for his move, including House Democratic leader Hakeem Jeffries.

=== Affordable Care Act subsidies ===
Passed in 2010, the Affordable Care Act (ACA) was a major reform of the U.S. healthcare system that, among other provisions, established income-based tax credits to subsidize the cost of health insurance. For eligible households, subsidies reduced the cost of insurance premiums to between 2.07% and 9.38% of income. Households earning more than 400% of the federal poverty level were ineligible for subsidies, creating a steep welfare cliff.

The American Rescue Plan Act of 2021 increased and expanded the subsidies for 2021 and 2022, fulfilling a campaign promise by President Joe Biden. It eliminated the upper income cap and limited the share of income paid, now for all households, to between 0% and 8.5%. In line with the Build Back Better Plan, Democratic lawmakers proposed bills to make the expanded tax credits permanent. As a compromise, the Inflation Reduction Act of 2022 extended the expanded subsidies through 2025.

In 2025, Congress allowed the expanded subsidies to expire and made additional cuts to the medical welfare system under the One Big Beautiful Bill Act. Contention over these changes became a major conflict leading to the government shutdown.

== Budget discussions ==
=== Initial passages and emerging conflicts ===
The continuing resolution Republicans passed set a deadline through the remainder of that year's fiscal budget term, expected to conclude at the end of September. However, Republicans repeatedly refused to negotiate with Democrats ahead of the deadline. In July, Republicans approved the Trump administration's request to rescind $9 billion allocated for foreign aid and public broadcasting. Washington senator Patty Murray, the ranking member of the Senate Committee on Appropriations, told The New York Times that the "partisan rescissions bill" complicated efforts for Democrats to work with Republicans on a funding bill for the next year's budget, set to begin in October. That month, senators opened debate on a series of appropriations bills, beginning with military construction projects and veterans programs. Democrats indicated that they would seek to avert a shutdown in budget discussions.

In July, Office of Management and Budget director Russell Vought said, "The appropriations process has to be less bipartisan", adding that the White House would not abide by bipartisan spending agreements and that he believed the Impoundment Control Act was unconstitutional. The remarks drew condemnation from Democrats and pushback from Senate Majority Leader John Thune.

By August, the Senate approved an initial set of spending bills, including $433 billion for veterans programs, $19.8 billion for military construction and family housing projects, $27.1 billion for agricultural programs, and $7.1 billion to continue the operations of Congress and legislative agencies. Although the bills passed before an anticipated recess that month for the first time since 2018, objections mounted, indicating further resistance ahead of the deadline. Louisiana senator John Kennedy unsuccessfully sought a two percent reduction in the agriculture bill. He later called for a separate vote on the legislative branch funding bill to state his opposition to the funding level. A fourth bill that would have funded the Department of Commerce, the Department of Justice, and science agencies faltered after opposition from Maryland senator Chris Van Hollen. The legislative branch funding bill largely kept the Government Accountability Office's funding levels consistent, despite the agency's conflict with the Trump administration; the House of Representatives's bill halved the office's budget. In September, House speaker Mike Johnson and House minority leader Hakeem Jeffries discussed extending government funding into November or December. A continuing resolution emerged as a likely way to resolve the impasse, though the cession of Congress's authority to determine spending concerned several Democrats.

=== Impasse and deadlock ===
The Trump administration, along with several fiscal hawks, advocated for funding the government through January. Conversely, Democrats and some Republicans sought a deal through November to ensure additional time for a compromise. The administration's move to cancel almost $5 billion in foreign aid through a pocket rescission intensified the impasse. House and Senate appropriators suggested a bill to fund the Department of Agriculture, the Department of Veterans Affairs, and congressional operations for a year with a short-term extension for other agencies. Representative Andy Harris, the chair of the Freedom Caucus, expressed reluctant support for a temporary bill proposed by Representative Tom Cole, the chair of the House Committee on Appropriations, so long as Cole had the votes. The discussions collided with the Trump administration's request to bolster security for Supreme Court justices and increase funding for the Marshals Service after the assassination of Charlie Kirk. Lower-court judges also sought security of their own.

Democrats sought to force Republicans to extend healthcare insurance subsidies, set to expire at the end of the year. Trump publicly told Republicans not to "bother dealing with them" and to support Cole's "clean" continuing resolution; additional funding for lawmakers after Charlie Kirk's death delayed the bill's release. On September 16, Johnson released the spending bill without insurance subsidies, expecting Democrats to balk and cause a shutdown or to support a bill that retained the status quo, increasing health insurance premiums for Affordable Care Act recipients. Representatives Thomas Massie and Victoria Spartz and Senator Rand Paul, all fiscally conservative Republicans, opposed the bill over its spending additions and a narrow timeline for a larger appropriations bill.

Senator Lisa Murkowski, a moderate Republican, also initially opposed the bill because she believed it could not pass the Senate. Democrats opposed the bill and made a counteroffer to increase health spending by $1 trillion. The Republican plan passed the House on September 19 but failed in the Senate, with 44 voting in favor to 48 against. John Fetterman was the only Senate Democrat to vote for the plan, while two Republicans voted against it. The same day, the Democratic plan failed in the Senate on party lines, by a vote of 47 to 45. In the following weeks, the Senate repeatedly rejected the Republican funding measure, with some proposals failing more than a dozen times amid ongoing negotiations.

Schumer and Jeffries requested a meeting with Trump after the votes failed. Trump abruptly canceled the meeting, calling their demands "unserious". He finally met with the Democrats, joined by Johnson and Thune, in the Oval Office one day before the deadline. This came following repeated calls by Democrats. After the meeting was agreed to, Jeffries and Schumer released a joint statement:

As we have repeatedly said, Democrats will meet anywhere, at any time and with anyone to negotiate a bipartisan spending agreement that meets the needs of the American people. We are resolute in our determination to avoid a government shutdown and address the Republican healthcare crisis. Time is running out.

The meeting was Jeffries's first with Trump and Trump's first invitation of Democrats to the White House in his second term. The meeting failed to lead to a path out of the gridlock. In fact, Trump stated that he would not begin negotiations with Democratic leaders on reopening the government until after the government had reopened.

At 7:31 p.m. EDT, hours after the meeting, Trump posted an AI-generated video on Truth Social of Chuck Schumer (in a faux speech voice-over) denigrating immigrants and calling the Democrats "woke pieces of shit" to mock the Democratic base, with Jeffries, an African American, at his side wearing a cartoonish sombrero and a handlebar mustache while the Mexican hat dance played in the background. (Note: Attributed to multiple sources:) The Republican messaging also included JD Vance averring that he believed a shutdown was imminent, with the Democrats to blame. Meanwhile, a White House official summed the president's position on finding a solution as "go fuck yourself."

On September 30, 2025, hours before the shutdown began, the Senate voted again on the Democratic and Republican plans. The Democratic plan again failed on party lines (47 in favor, 53 against). All Republicans except Rand Paul, along with Democrats Catherine Cortez Masto and John Fetterman, as well as Angus King, an independent who caucuses with Democrats, voted for the plan, which thus failed 51–47. Despite receiving a majority of votes in the Senate, the Republican plan failed to pass because it could not overcome a 60-vote filibuster.

Meanwhile, Johnson continued to keep the House of Representatives largely in recess and did not hold votes on funding legislation. This led the New York Times journalist Annie Karni to write that Johnson had largely deferred his role to the president during the second Trump presidency by not holding oversight hearings and holding the House out of session. She added that Johnson had limited control over his members and instead, according to Karni, made "himself subservient to Mr. Trump".

After the votes, the Office of Management and Budget directed agencies to execute their shutdown plans, leading federal agencies to furlough hundreds of thousands of employees deemed nonessential. The shutdown officially began just after midnight on October 1, 2025.

==== Presidential use of rescissions ====
The president of the United States historically had the power to not spend funds that had been appropriated by Congress, a process known as impoundment of appropriated funds. In 1974, in response to president Richard Nixon's impoundment of tens of billions of dollars, Congress passed the Congressional Budget and Impoundment Control Act of 1974, which eliminated this unilateral authority. In its place, the Impoundment Control Act allows the president to propose impoundments as a rescission bill to Congress, which must approve the rescission within 45 days.

Use of rescissions had been dormant since Bill Clinton's presidency, but in early 2025 Trump's Department of Government Efficiency made large cuts to appropriated parts of the federal government, including reducing foreign aid and public broadcasting. The Trump administration revived rescissions as a way to permanently codify DOGE's cuts, proposing a rescissions bill to Congress that became law on July 24 as the Rescissions Act of 2025.

On September 26, 2025, the Supreme Court granted an application for stay in Department of State v. AIDS Vaccine Advocacy Coalition lifting a lower court ruling preventing Trump from withholding funds appropriated by congress.

Trump's use of rescissions became a major hurdle in budget negotiations. Schumer expressed fear that anything the Democratic Party negotiated to include in a budget would be undone by rescission.

== Shutdown overview ==
This was the 21st funding gap and 11th government shutdown in modern U.S. history, the third to occur during a Trump presidency, and the first to occur since the shutdown that lasted from December 2018 to January 2019 during the first Trump administration. Congressional activity centered on dueling Democratic and Republican proposals to end the shutdown. Until October 13, the Senate held continuous votes on the Democratic-led continuing resolution. It failed on party-line votes.

During the shutdown, the Senate continuously held votes on the House-passed continuing resolution. The votes failed mostly along party lines. Democratic senators John Fetterman and Catherine Cortez Masto broke from their party to vote for the resolution, as did independent senator Angus King. Republican senator Rand Paul broke from his party to vote against it.

The Republican-led House stayed in recess during the shutdown and held no votes. On October 20, Speaker Mike Johnson said the House was on 24-hour notice to return, if needed.

=== Major events ===
On October 25, President Trump announced that a private donor would provide $130 million to cover pay for the US military. Critics of the move noted ethics concerns due to the Antideficiency Act. The New York Times later reported that the donor was Timothy Mellon.

On October 27, the Department of Agriculture announced that no SNAP benefits would be issued for November due to the shutdown. That same day, the American Federation of Government Employees union issued a statement calling for Congress to pass a "clean continuing resolution", saying that otherwise the shutdown would never end.

The next day, over two dozen states sued the Trump administration to reinstate SNAP benefits for November. On October 31, a Rhode Island federal judge ruled that the USDA must distribute SNAP benefits to recipients as soon as possible, shortly after another federal judge ruled in another case that withholding SNAP benefits was illegal.

On November 7, the Trump administration appealed a district court order to pay SNAP benefits in full. As a result, the Supreme Court agreed to block the SNAP order until the 1st Circuit issued a ruling. At the same time, at least nine states issued November SNAP benefits, including California, Wisconsin, Kansas, Pennsylvania, New York, New Jersey, and Vermont. The next day, the USDA warned states they could distribute only partial SNAP benefits and that the federal government would pull funding from states that distributed full benefits.

Also on November 7, airlines began canceling flights to comply with an order by the Federal Aviation Administration to relieve pressure on air traffic controllers. The FAA ordered that airlines cut 4% of flights and ramp up to 10% by November 14. On November 17, the FAA lifted all flight restrictions related to the government shutdown. Department of Homeland Security Secretary Kristi Noem said TSA agents would receive $10,000 bonuses if they provided "exemplary service" during the shutdown, though it was unclear how many agents that would apply to.

=== Negotiations ===
The first major negotiation occurred on the Senate floor on October 1, during a third vote to end the shutdown. Senators discussed shortening the length of the Republican-planned continuing resolution to use that time to come to a more significant agreement. No agreement was made. Senators of both parties called the preliminary negotiation a "productive discussion".

After that, there were very few public negotiations. On October 21, President Trump and Senate Republican leadership met at the White House, with Trump saying they would not "be extorted on this crazy plot of theirs". Trump also told Senate Democratic leader Chuck Schumer and House Democratic leader Hakeem Jeffries he would meet with them only after the shutdown ended.

On October 23, the Senate voted on competing bills to pay troops and federal employees. Republican Senator Ron Johnson introduced the Shutdown Fairness Act, which would provide pay for troops and "excepted employees" during the shutdown. Senator Chris Van Hollen introduced a similar bill that would cover pay for all federal employees. Johnson's bill received 54 votes, failing to meet the 60-vote filibuster threshold.

On October 31, on Truth Social, President Trump called for Republicans to end the Senate filibuster, which requires 60 out of 100 senators to approve legislation, in an effort to end the shutdown. Democrats also increasingly faced pressure to identify a path to reopening the government while continuing to negotiate policy demands.

On November 6, Senator John Kennedy introduced two bills that would prevent members of Congress from getting paid during a government shutdown. His proposals came as the current shutdown was on track to become the longest in U.S. history, leading to federal workers missing paychecks. On November 7, Senate Democratic leadership made an offer to reopen the government in exchange for maintaining Affordable Care Act subsidies for a year. Senate Republicans rejected the offer.

==== Senate agreement ====
President Trump signs the Senate amendment ending the government shutdown.

Continuing Appropriations, Agriculture, Legislative Branch, Military Construction and Veterans Affairs, and Extensions Act, 2026
- Other short titles: Public Law 119-37
- Long title: Making continuing appropriations and extensions for fiscal year 2026, and for other purposes.
- Enacted by: the 119th United States Congress

Citations
- Public law: Pub. L. 119–37 (menu; GPO has not yet published law)

Legislative history
- Introduced in the House as H.R. 5371 by Tom Cole (R‑OK) on September 16, 2025; Passed the House on September 19, 2025 (217-212); Passed the Senate on November 10, 2025 (60-40) with amendment; House agreed to Senate amendment on November 12, 2025 (222-209); Signed into law by President Donald Trump on November 12, 2025

On November 9, several senators negotiated a bipartisan agreement. The Senate voted 60–40 that night to advance a continuing resolution to reopen the government. Eight Senate Democrats (Dick Durbin, Angus King, Maggie Hassan, Jeanne Shaheen, Catherine Cortez Masto, Jacky Rosen, John Fetterman, and Tim Kaine) joined all Senate Republicans except Rand Paul to advance it. The deal was brokered by Shaheen, Hassan, and King. On November 10, the Senate passed the agreement by a 60–40 vote. On November 12, the House voted 222–209 to end the government shutdown. President Trump signed the bill at 10:24 PM EST that day, whereupon the shutdown ended.

The bill

- funds the government at existing spending levels until January 30;
- funds full-year appropriations bills for military construction and veterans affairs, the legislative branch, and the Department of Agriculture (the bills for these agencies omit spending cuts the Trump administration had proposed earlier in the year);
- includes $203.5 million to fund security for members of Congress and $852 million for US Capitol Police;
- funds SNAP through September 2026, the end of the fiscal year;
- guarantees a December Senate vote—but not a House vote—to extend ACA subsidies (Senator Angus King has said there is "no guarantee" that an extension of subsidies will pass before they expire on December 31) and extends ACA enrollment to January 15, granting additional time for a deal to be reached;
- guarantees that roughly 4,000 federal employees laid off during the shutdown be rehired and granted back pay;
- bars the Office of Management and Budget from implementing mass layoffs of federal workers until January 30;
- funds the Government Accountability Office at its current level, rejecting a component of the earlier House stopgap bill;
- allows senators to sue the federal government for at least $500,000 in statutory damages if investigators collect or have collected their records without their knowledge (this applies retroactively to January 1, 2022, months before the launch of the Arctic Frost investigation);
- rewrites the federal definition of hemp to effectively ban products with more than 0.4 milligrams of THC per container;
- provides $400 million in funding for research, development and prototyping for the Boeing E-7 Wedgetail radar jet; and
- extends the Farm Bill

Senate vote on passage
| Party | Votes for | Votes against | Not voting/Absent |
|---|---|---|---|
| Republican (53) | 52 | 1: Rand Paul | —N/a |
| Democratic (45) | 7: Catherine Cortez Masto; Dick Durbin; John Fetterman; Maggie Hassan; Tim Kaine; Jacky Rosen; Jeanne Shaheen | 38 | —N/a |
| Independent (2) | 1: Angus King | 1: Bernie Sanders | —N/a |
| Total (100) | 60 | 40 | —N/a |

House vote on passage
| Party | Votes for | Votes against | Not voting/Absent |
|---|---|---|---|
| Republican (219) | 216 | 2: Thomas Massie; Greg Steube | 1: Mike McCaul |
| Democratic (214) | 6: Henry Cuellar; Don Davis; Jared Golden; Adam Gray; Marie Gluesenkamp Perez; Tom Suozzi | 216 | 1: Bonnie Watson Coleman |
| Total (433) | 222 | 209 | 2 |

== Effects ==
=== On employees ===
==== Furloughed workers ====
900,000 federal workers were estimated to have been furloughed, and an additional 700,000 may have worked without pay, according to the Partnership for Public Service. The Department of Agriculture intended to lay off workers. On October 8, the Internal Revenue Service announced furloughs for 34,000 employees, about 50% of its staff.

Expected agency furloughs
| Agency | Employees | Furloughs | Percent |
|---|---|---|---|
| Environmental Protection Agency | 15,166 | 13,432 | 89% |
| Department of Education | 2,447 | 2,117 | 87% |
| Department of Commerce | 42,984 | 34,711 | 81% |
| Department of Labor | 12,916 | 9,775 | 76% |
| Department of Housing and Urban Development | 6,105 | 4,359 | 71% |
| Department of State | 26,995 | 16,651 | 62% |
| Department of Energy | 13,812 | 8,105 | 59% |
| Internal Revenue Service | 74,299 | 34,429 | 54% |
| Department of the Interior | 58,619 | 30,996 | 53% |
| Department of Agriculture | 85,907 | 42,256 | 49% |
| Department of Defense (Note: Excluding military personnel) | 741,477 | 334,904 | 45% |
| Department of Health and Human Services | 79,717 | 32,460 | 41% |
| General Services Administration | 10,777 | 3,880 | 36% |
| Small Business Administration | 6,201 | 1,456 | 23% |
| Department of Transportation | 53,717 | 12,213 | 23% |
| Social Security Administration | 51,825 | 6,197 | 12% |
| Department of Justice | 115,131 | 12,480 | 11% |
| Office of Personnel Management | 2,007 | 210 | 10% |
| Department of Homeland Security | 271,927 | 14,184 | 5% |
| Department of Veterans Affairs | 461,499 | 14,874 | 3% |
| Department of Treasury | 81,165 | 1,736 | 2% |

==== Pay status ====
Members of Congress are guaranteed pay during government shutdowns due to a permanent appropriation passed in 1983, allowing their pay to not be renewed annually compared to other departments. The average member is paid an annual salary of $174,000, with the speaker of the House earning $223,500 and party leaders in each chamber and the president pro tempore of the Senate earning $193,400. Previous shutdowns required Congress to approve back pay for employees, but a 2019 law made it mandatory, except for contractors not included in the law.

According to a Bipartisan Policy Center review, about 830,000 federal workers were continuously paid during the shutdown, while over 1 million were unpaid. Senate staffers were told on October 17 that they would not receive a paycheck on October 20 or for the rest of the shutdown. The judicial branch also announced that it had run out of funding to cover full operations.

During an October 7 meeting with reporters, Speaker Johnson said he supported back pay for government workers. A draft memo from the Office of Management and Budget reported by Axios floated the idea of not back paying workers after the shutdown ended. An updated version of the memo suggested that either the Government Employee Fair Treatment Act had been misinterpreted or the language was deficient. The memo indicated that Congress was responsible for providing the back pay by including it in any bill passed to fund the government.

About two weeks into the shutdown, Business Insider reported that many federal workers and members of the military were dipping into savings and concerned about covering basic needs and medical costs. Civilian Department of Defense employees grew frustrated about pay status and treatment compared to military members by early November 2025, as nearly half of Pentagon civilian employees were veterans as of 2021. Some veteran civilian employees indicated that they felt disrespected and were looking to leave federal work after years or decades at the Defense Department. Others noted concerns with US national security as personal debt and financial concerns are key questions in the security-clearance process.

By late October and early November it was reported that many federal workers had resorted to taking out bank loans to cover costs while either furloughed or working without pay. One spouse of a Department of Defense worker told reporters that they had taken out a no-interest loan of less than $5,000 from United Services Automobile Association (USAA), a small part of the apparently almost $365 million the organization had issued to over 119,000 federal employees since the shutdown. In a similar program, the Navy Federal Credit Union began to issue Paycheck Assistance Program loans, which are also zero-interest, while the Redwood Credit Union also began issuing zero-interest loans.

==== Use of food banks and assistance programs ====
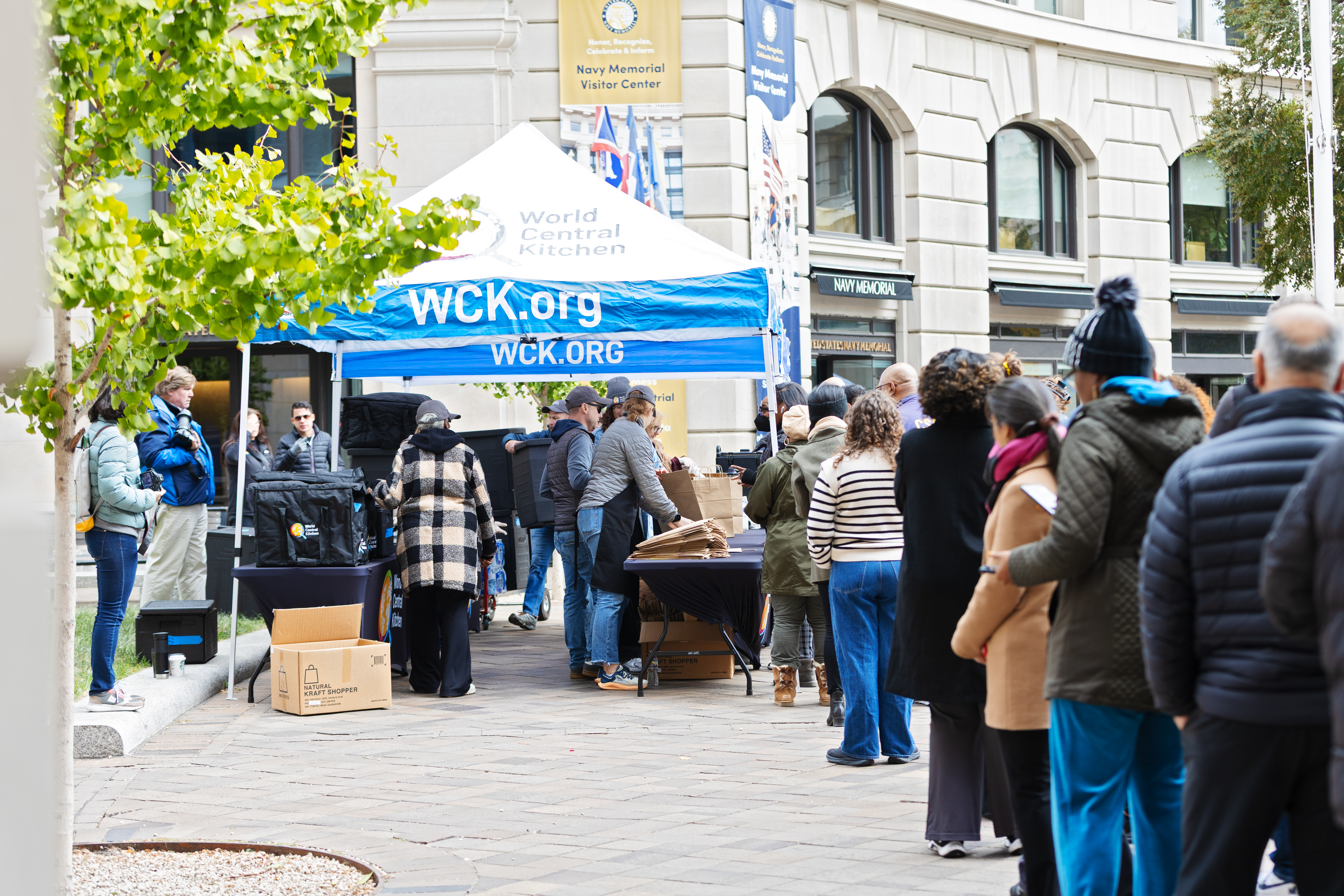
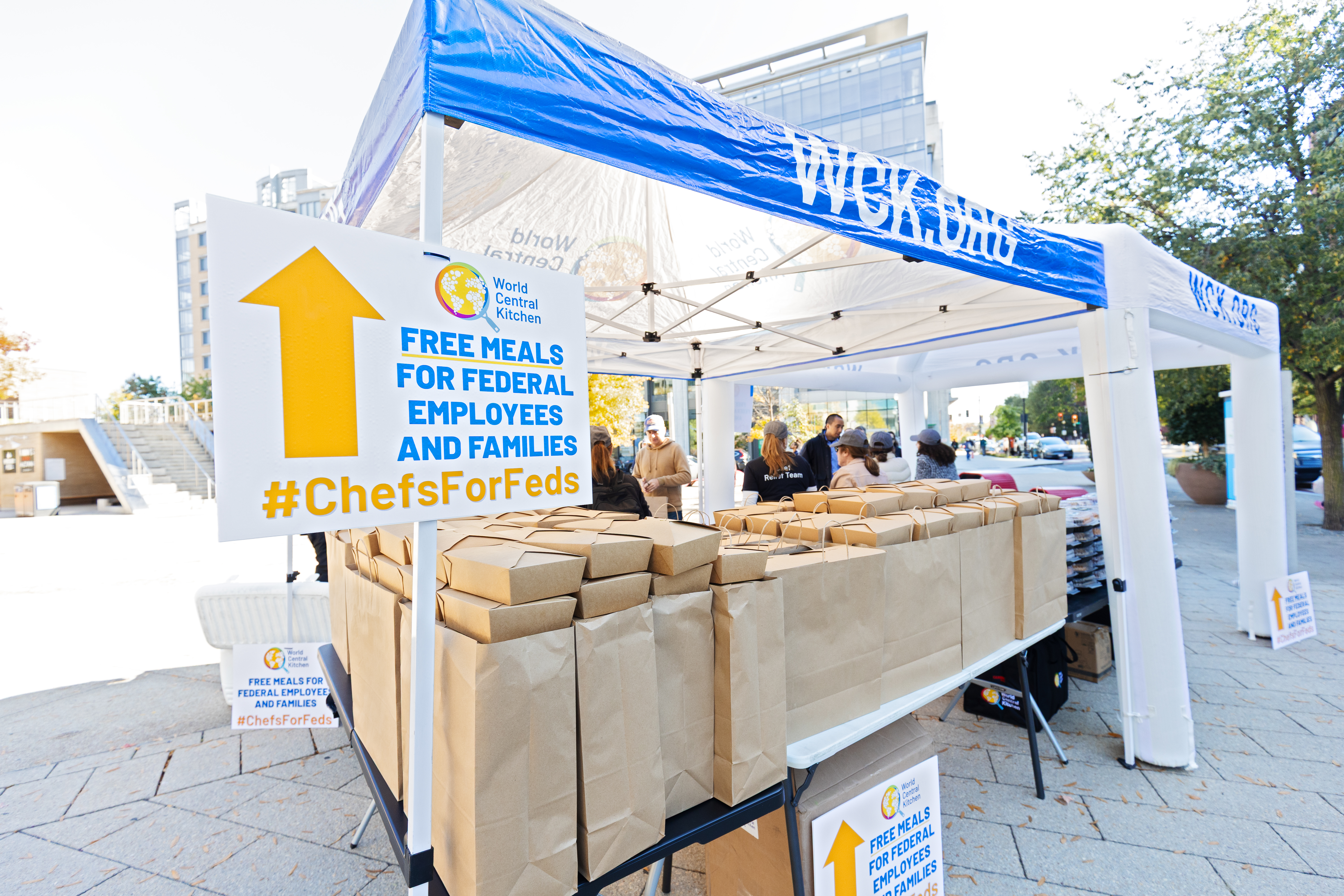
World Central Kitchen serving meals to federal workers at the United States Navy Memorial plaza in Washington, D.C.

Federal workers were offered free meals through the World Central Kitchen at pop-up locations, while others such as the Archdiocese of Baltimore and the Capital Area Food Bank offered free food and meals. In and around the capitol and Maryland utility providers such as Washington Gas, WSSC Water, and Pepco offered assistance to workers who had been impacted.

The Capitol Area Food Bank and 400 food pantries and aid organizations in the capital, northern Virginia, and two Maryland counties reported that they were providing 8 million more meals than previously budgeted by November 8. The food bank reported that it was an almost a 20% increase in use for the budget year.

=== On elected officials ===
Adelita Grijalva was elected to represent Arizona's 7th congressional district in a special election on September 23, after the death of the previous representative, Raúl Grijalva, her father. She was not sworn in until the shutdown ended. Speaker Mike Johnson said it was "standard practice" to "schedule a swearing in for the Representative-elect when the House returns to session." But Johnson, who canceled over a dozen scheduled legislative sessions since Grijalva's election, has sworn in other lawmakers out of session, including two Republican special election winners, Jimmy Patronis and Randy Fine. Representatives of both parties alleged that Johnson was trying to avoid a vote to compel the release of files from the Justice Department's investigation into convicted sex offender Jeffrey Epstein. Grijalva was sworn in on November 12 after the House reconvened to vote on the Senate-passed spending bill.

Media sources have named the shutdown as a factor in several concurrent Democratic electoral victories, including the 2025 Virginia gubernatorial election, the 2025 New Jersey gubernatorial election, the 2025 New York City mayoral election, and state legislative elections in Pennsylvania, Mississippi, Virginia, and Georgia. Trump said the shutdown was killing the Republican Party and called on his supporters to eliminate the filibuster and reopen the government.

=== On military ===
Military personnel were still on active duty but did not receive orders from their commanders except in emergencies. Veterans' benefits and military operations were also funded, but not military and civilian workers.

Due to the Government Employee Fair Treatment Act of 2019, which passed after the 2018–2019 government shutdown, federal employees and military personnel are ensured back pay after the shutdown ends. While speaking with reporters on October 8, Speaker Johnson said he was not open to moving forward a bill to pay troops if the shutdown continued into the next week. On October 11, Trump directed Secretary of Defense Pete Hegseth to pay service members using funds previously earmarked for other projects. A Department of Defense official later said that $8 billion of unobligated research and development funds would be used to pay military personnel. The Director of Budget and Entitlement Policy at the Cato Institute raised concerns about the directive's broad reach and legality.

On October 24, the Pentagon announced it would accept a private $130 million donation to help pay military personnel. Ethics concerns were raised about the decision to accept the gift, with many saying the donation might violate the Antideficiency Act, which bars federal agencies from spending funds not appropriated by Congress. On October 26, The New York Times reported that the private donor was Timothy Mellon, a longtime Trump donor who gave $50 million to Trump's super PAC during his 2024 election campaign.

On October 22, the German Finance Ministry announced that it would take over the payment of 11,000 local employees stationed at U.S. military bases in Germany and anticipated being reimbursed by the U.S. government. The Fort Leavenworth Installation Warrior Restaurant closed due to the shutdown. Per a notice from base officials, the restaurant is the only dining facility or DFAC on the base where most junior enlisted soldiers can eat if they cannot leave the base.

==== Use of food banks ====
A little over a week into the shutdown, Time reported an increase in military members and families relying on food pantries, as service members' spouses are usually either unemployed due to frequent relocation or also employed by the federal government. A military-based food pantry in Kansas saw a 300% increase in traffic, while the Armed Service YMCA, a military nonprofit, saw a 30% increase in food requests across all locations and a 34% increase at its location in Killeen, Texas.

In early November 2025, directives posted to the U.S. Army Garrison Bavaria website were swiftly taken down after being reported on. The directives stated that the team would continue to provide services for those working and living in the community while also providing a running list of German support organizations such as Essen für Alle (Food for All), Foodsharin e.V., Tafel Deutschland and Too Good To Go. A food bank near Wright-Patterson Air Force Base in Ohio reported that their numbers were up with an average of 250 families a week in September 2025, with an anticipated 500 families a week in early November 2025.

=== On Native Americans ===
The federal shutdown had varied effects on Native Americans and tribal nations. Those with casinos, oil and gas leases, or other forms of independent revenue reported that they believed they could operate for several months, while others more dependent on government funding and assistance were more concerned. Others raised concerns that the Trump administration would act on earlier calls by Trump and Elon Musk for the General Services Administration to terminate leases held by the Bureau of Indian Affairs and other offices or terminate employees.

Shortly after the shutdown was announced, the Navajo Nation announced that it would continue to offer essential services to members. During an October 29 meeting of the Senate Indian Affairs Committee, tribal representatives reported the difficulties of covering the costs of necessities such as heating, food, and education. National Indian Education Association president Kerry Bird said most of her staff had been furloughed and spoke of her concerns about the freeze on Education Department grants.

After SNAP benefits were frozen and then halved by the Trump administration, many native families were impacted, as 23% of all American Indian and Alaska Native households used the benefits in 2023. The Cherokee Nation and the Choctaw Nation launched stopgap programs to cover the lack of benefits. The Fort Peck Indian Reservation, Blackfeet Nation, Cheyenne River Sioux Tribe, and others authorized limited hunting of bison that had been part of restoration efforts to provide food for those who lost SNAP benefits. The Mi'kmaq Nation added trout and locally hunted elk to its food banks and the Comanche Nation's food banks began accepting deer meat.

=== Economics ===
The Department of Labor and the Department of Commerce were to suspend economic data releases for the Bureau of Labor Statistics and the Census Bureau. The Office of the Trade Representative remained open. Ahead of the shutdown, the United States dollar and Treasury securities fell.

Concern was voiced about the shutdown and its effects on the Federal Reserve's October 29 decision about the next interest rate, as key reports were not being generated. Additional concern was raised about the potential reduction of the annualized real gross domestic product growth for the fourth quarter, as it was projected at 0.1%, though much of that could be recouped, as has happened after previous shutdowns. On October 6, National Economic Council Director Kevin Hassett told reporters that each week of the shutdown could cost the U.S. economy about $15 billion. The Congressional Budget Office estimated that the US economy permanently lost about $11 billion from the shutdown.

The shutdown's effects were prominent in Washington, where unemployment was over the national average of 4.3% in a September 2025 report from the Office of Revenue Analysis and the highest in the US for months. About 20% of all federal workers are employed in Washington, with about 150,000 residing in the area. Local businesses reported a revenue decline of about 50% compared to before the shutdown.

=== Education ===
A contingency plan was created for the Department of Education after 95% of its staff was furloughed, apart from the Federal Student Aid Office. Services such as student aid disbursements, funding for Title 1 schools, and the Individuals with Disabilities Education Act continue during the shutdown. Schools receiving Impact Aid, such as those on military bases or Native American reservations, are affected as they are primarily funded by the federal government, not state or local taxes. On October 11, it was reported that the Department of Education had dismissed nearly everyone in the Office of Special Education and Rehabilitative Services in a wave of mass layoffs during the shutdown.

The shutdown confused college students and their families, who were unsure if they could complete the FAFSA and receive federal aid. Federal aid and the FAFSA are not affected by the shutdown and many colleges and universities issued statements to that effect. Some higher education institutions and research associations issued guidance about the shutdown's impact. The National Institutes of Health said that while many researchers can still draw from its funds, there are some restrictive terms and conditions. Some universities paused tuition payments for students affected by the shutdown, such as the more than 75,000 college and trade school students who are dependents and survivors of former military members.

The government shutdown affected the Head Start program, an early education program that serves children under six. The Department of Health and Human Services said that more than 58,600 children in 134 Head Start centers in 41 states and Puerto Rico would not receive grants on November 1 if the shutdown continued. The program's funding had already been affected, as the Trump administration mistakenly froze grants in January 2025.

=== Food ===
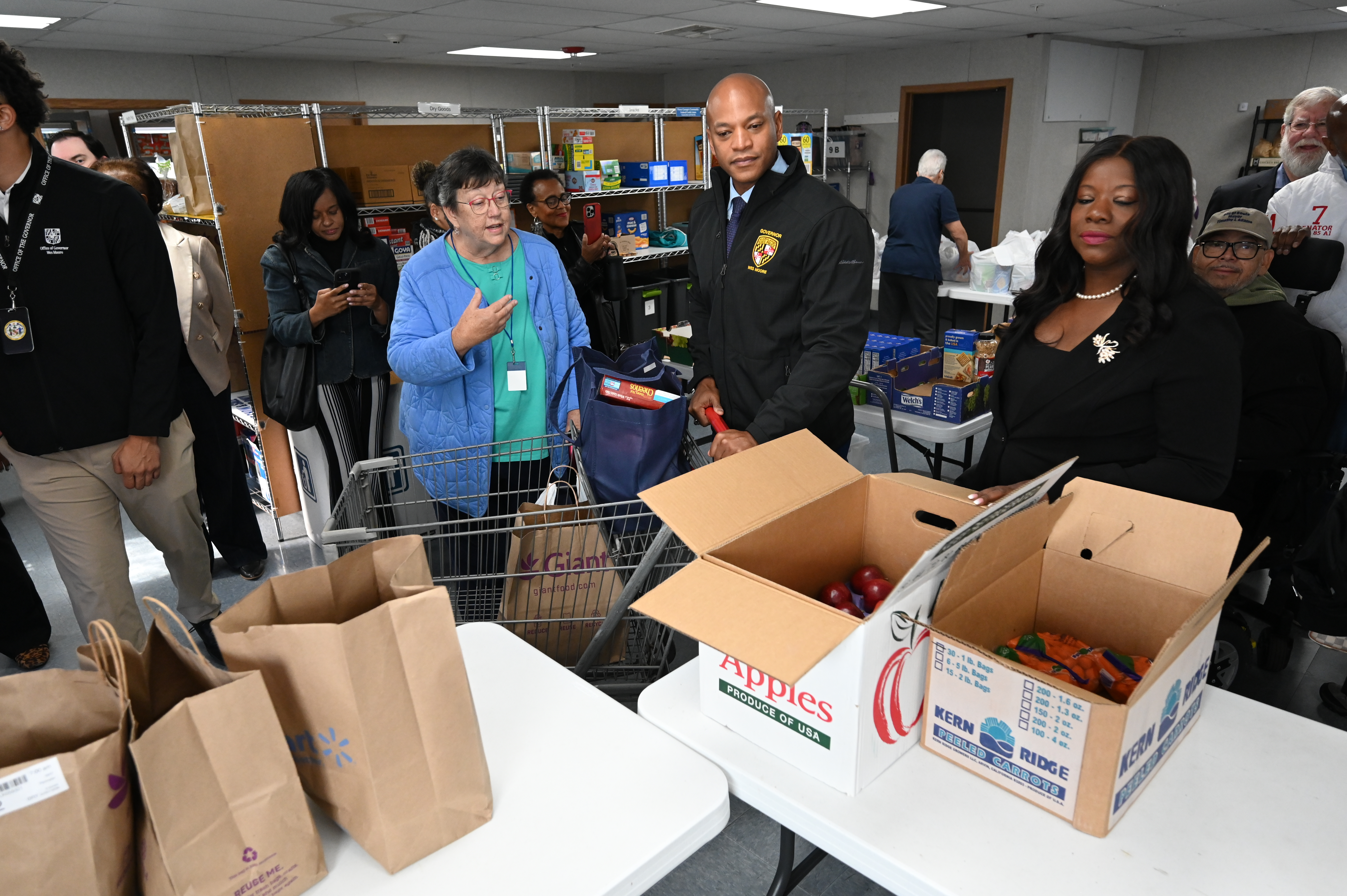
Maryland governor Wes Moore visiting a food pantry during the shutdown

Food and Drug Administration commissioner Marty Makary told employees that the agency was exempt from shutdown cuts.

As of early November, the Special Supplemental Nutrition Program for Women, Infants and Children (WIC) program was distributing benefits normally, as a $450 million funding source had been found. Before the shutdown began, WIC funding had been expected to run out after two weeks, but a week into the shutdown, the USDA distributed money from the 2024 fiscal year to cover some access in some states. WIC served about 6.7 million people monthly during the 2024 fiscal year, including about 41% of all infants in the country.

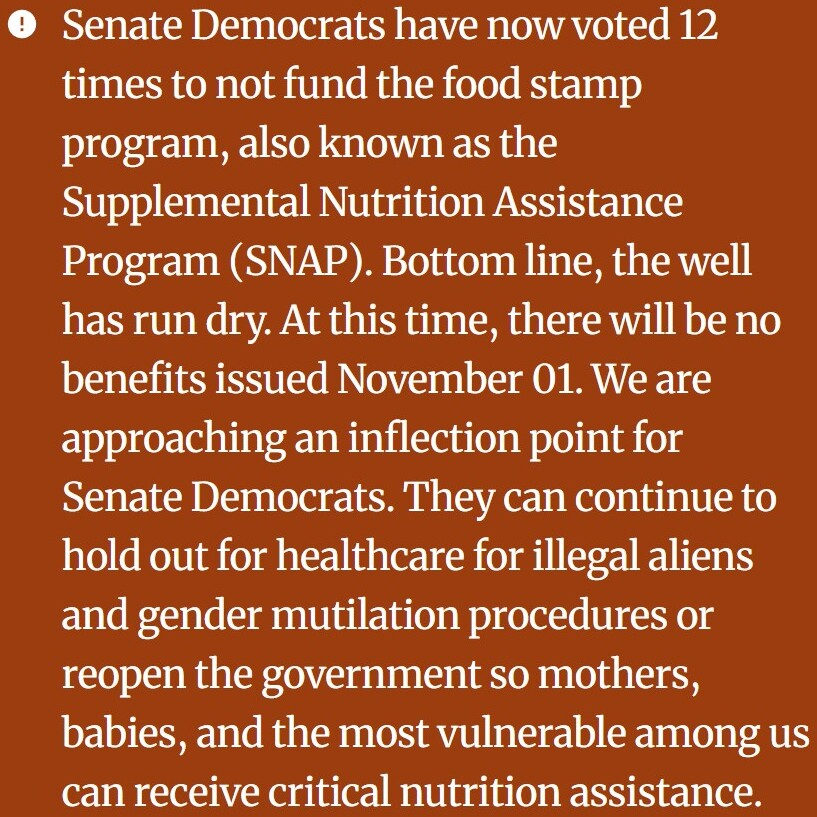
USDA website notice regarding SNAP on October 27, 2025

Payments from the Supplemental Nutrition Assistance Program (SNAP) were delayed and halved. In October, states began to notify SNAP recipients that benefits would pause, and on October 27, the USDA announced that no benefits would be issued on November 1, also blaming the shutdown on the Democratic Party. On November 3, after lawsuits against the administration, the USDA said it would send SNAP recipients half the funds it would have otherwise sent them for November. According to the Center on Budgets and Policy Priorities, the USDA has about $5 billion in SNAP contingency funding, or about 60% of a month in benefits. More than 41 million people participate in the program. Most recipients in 2023 were aged 18 to 59; children were about 39%. The average monthly assistance per person in 2025 was $190.59, with a household averaging $356.41.

SNAP recipients by county

The decision left the program's funding uncertain for approximately 43 million Americans who receive SNAP benefits. Several states, including California and New York, announced temporary funding measures to maintain payments during the shutdown. Virginia Governor Glenn Youngkin announced the Virginia Emergency Nutrition Assistance (VENA) initiative to offset the loss of federal funding for SNAP. Maryland Governor Wes Moore announced the release of $62 million in funding to offset the loss of November federal funding for SNAP. After many states began issuing SNAP benefits in late October, the USDA issued a memo ordering the states to stop issuing "unauthorized" SNAP benefits while they challenged the decision.

The National School Lunch Program (NSLP), which provides low-cost or free school lunches to children, provided more than 4.8 billion lunches in 2024. This program is not expected to be affected by the shutdown, but Diane Pratt-Heavner of the School Nutrition Association said that some state agencies have reported that they lack the funds to reimburse schools for providing the lunches. The USDA reportedly released funding for the program in October 2025, but in early October some states reported that they had yet to receive the funds.

==== Food banks ====
During the shutdown, food bank nonprofit organizations in Washington, D.C., and nationwide, such as Stronghold Food Pantry, Feeding America, and Capital Area Food Bank, reported extended queues at food banks in the D.C. area, Virginia, and Maryland, where many federal workers live. After many states announced that SNAP and WIC benefits would not be issued for November, many food banks began to prepare for an influx of people set to lose the benefits. There was also an influx in large donations to food banks during the shutdown from the Tull Family Foundation, Bank of America, the Centene Foundation, H-E-B, and many local philanthropists and businesses. Food bank drives and personal donations increased, including at Alpha Kappa Alpha and Boy Scout meetings.

College and university students increasingly relied on food banks. More than 1.1 million college students are on SNAP. Many students reported concerns about being able to stay in school or properly cover costs due to lack of SNAP benefits and rising grocery and cost-of-living costs.

==== Resulting lawsuits ====
On October 28, over two dozen states sued the Trump administration in Massachusetts v. USDA after the USDA announced that no SNAP benefits would be disbursed to recipients on November 1. The states requested that the presiding judge force the administration to maintain the benefits.

Massachusetts v. USDA
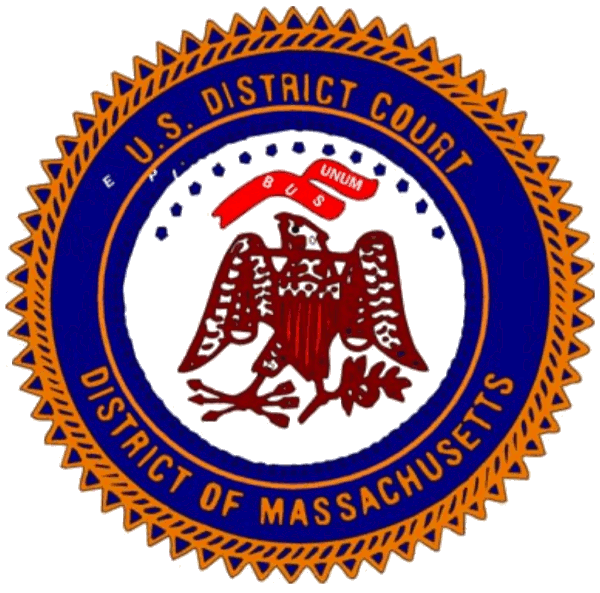
- Court: District of Massachusetts
- Full case name: Massachusetts, California, Arizona, Minnesota, Connecticut, Colorado, Delaware, District of Columbia, Hawai'i, Illinois, Governor Laura Kelly, Office of Governor Andy Beshear, Maine, Maryland, Michigan, Nevada, New Jersey, New Mexico, State of New York, North Carolina, Oregon, Governor Josh Shapiro, Rhode Island, Vermont, State of Washington, Wisconsin v. United States Department of Agriculture, Secretary Brooke Rollins, Director Russell Vought
- Started: October 28, 2025
- Docket nos.: 1:25-cv-13165

Outcome
- Ongoing

Court membership
- Judge sitting: Indira Talwani

On October 31, it was reported that Rhode Island federal judge John J. McConnell Jr. had ruled in Rhode Island State Council of Churches v. Rollins that the USDA must distribute SNAP benefits to recipients as soon as possible. McConnell referenced the US$6 billion in contingency funds. Federal judge Indira Talwani gave the Trump administration a November 3 deadline to respond to her about authorizing at least partial SNAP benefits for November.

Rhode Island State Council of Churches v. Rollins
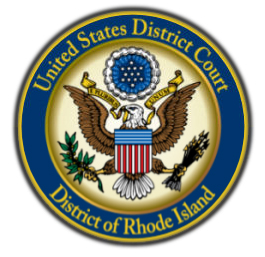
- Court: District of Rhode Island
- Full case name: Rhode Island State Council of Churches v. Rollins
- Started: October 30, 2025
- Docket nos.: 1:25-cv-00569

Outcome
- Ongoing

Court membership
- Judge sitting: John J. McConnell Jr.

Trump said his administration's lawyers were unsure the administration had the authority to pay for SNAP during the shutdown. On October 31, Trump posted, "If we are given the appropriate legal direction by the Court, it will BE MY HONOR to provide the funding, just like I did with Military and Law Enforcement Pay." In the post he also blamed the Democratic Party for the shutdown. On CNN's State of the Union, Treasury Secretary Scott Bessent said the administration would follow the ruling and suggested that the benefits could restart by November 5.

Legal challenges arose after the USDA announced the suspension of full Supplemental Nutrition Assistance Program (SNAP) benefits for November. A federal district court initially ordered the Trump administration to continue full benefit payments, but this order was temporarily stayed by Justice Jackson after the government filed an appeal. On November 10, Trump administration lawyers petitioned the Supreme Court to allow SNAP benefits to remain frozen, with a ruling expected from the court by November 11.

=== Health care and insurance ===
The shutdown did not affect Medicare and Medicaid, though certain services, such as Medicare card procurement, may shut down. The health insurance marketplace and Food and Drug Administration drug approvals will also continue. The Department of Health and Human Services, the Centers for Disease Control and Prevention, and the Centers for Medicare and Medicaid Services intend to furlough much of their staff, with some retention at the FDA; the National Institutes of Health will retain only a quarter of its staff, preventing it from issuing grant peer reviews, conducting advisory council meetings, and performing basic research. The Centers for Disease Control and Prevention's communications operations will be affected.

On October 23, it was reported that many people who obtain health insurance under the ACA had begun to see premium prices rise after open enrollment began on October 15 without any of the federal subsidies that formerly lowered consumer costs.

=== Judiciary and law enforcement ===
Supreme Court public information officer Patricia McCabe told reporters that the Court expected to run out of funding by October 18. McCabe indicated that the Supreme Court would be closed to the public but would continue to conduct official business such as hearing oral arguments, issuing orders, and other ventures. The Administrative Office of the US Courts gave a similar timeline for federal courts, with funding expected to dry up by October 20. Several federal district courts announced that they would begin operating on modified schedules, such as limiting employees who work specific days or closing entirely for others, to handle the changes to their budgets.

On the first day of the shutdown, the Trump administration froze about $26 billion in funding for transit and green-energy projects in Democratic-leaning states.

=== NASA ===
According to a September 29 shutdown plan released by NASA, 15,094 NASA civil servants have been furloughed, while 3,124 have been classified as exempted and continue working. The exempted workers include those needed for the operations of the International Space Station, those operating active satellite missions, and those working on the Artemis program. The shutdown did not affect preparations for the Artemis II crewed mission around the Moon, which launched in April 2026.

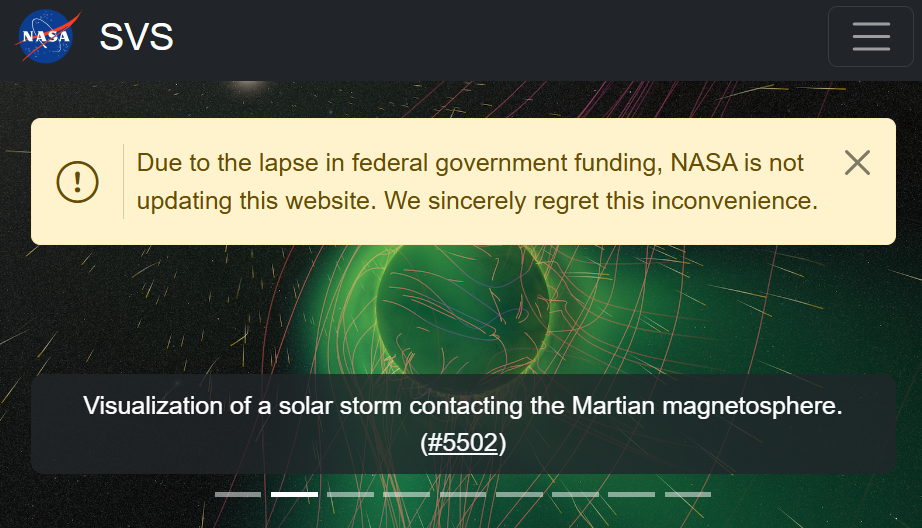
Service message from NASA's Scientific Visualization Studio

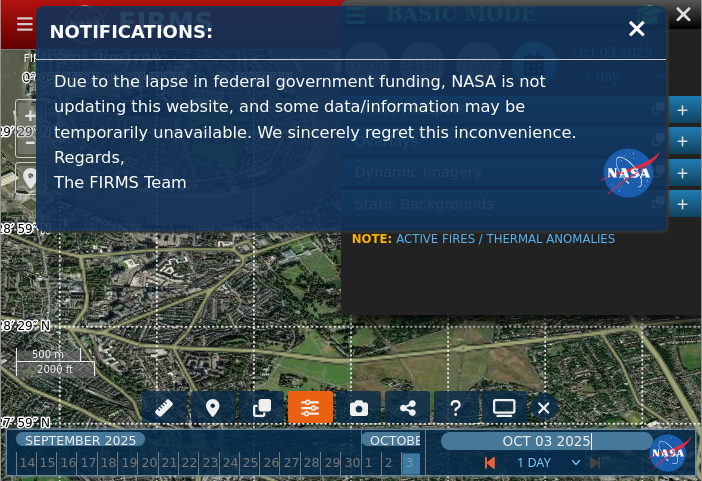
Service message from NASA's Fire Information for Resource Management System (FIRMS)

=== National parks and capital museums ===
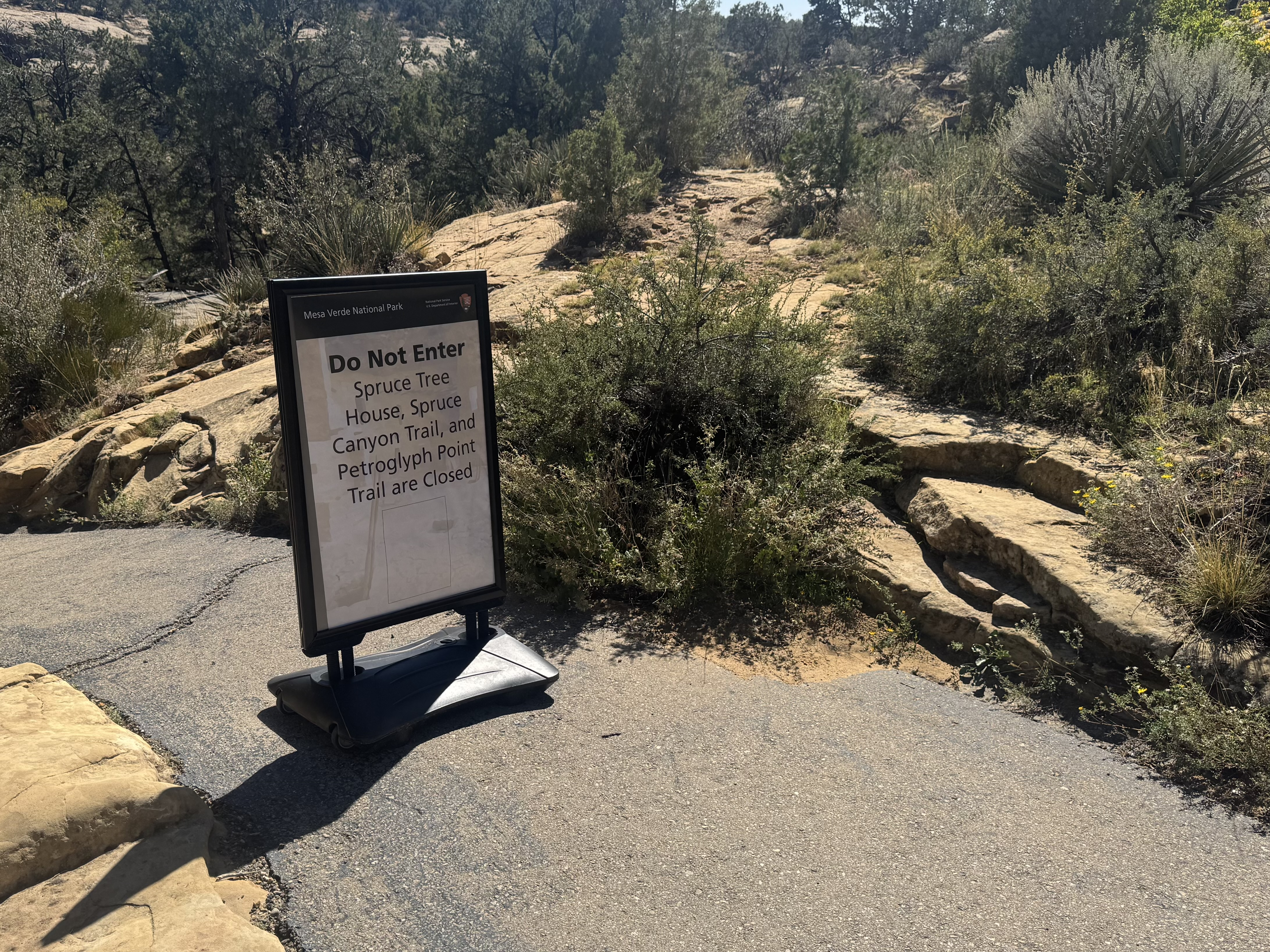
Mesa Verde National Park trails closed on October 5, 2025

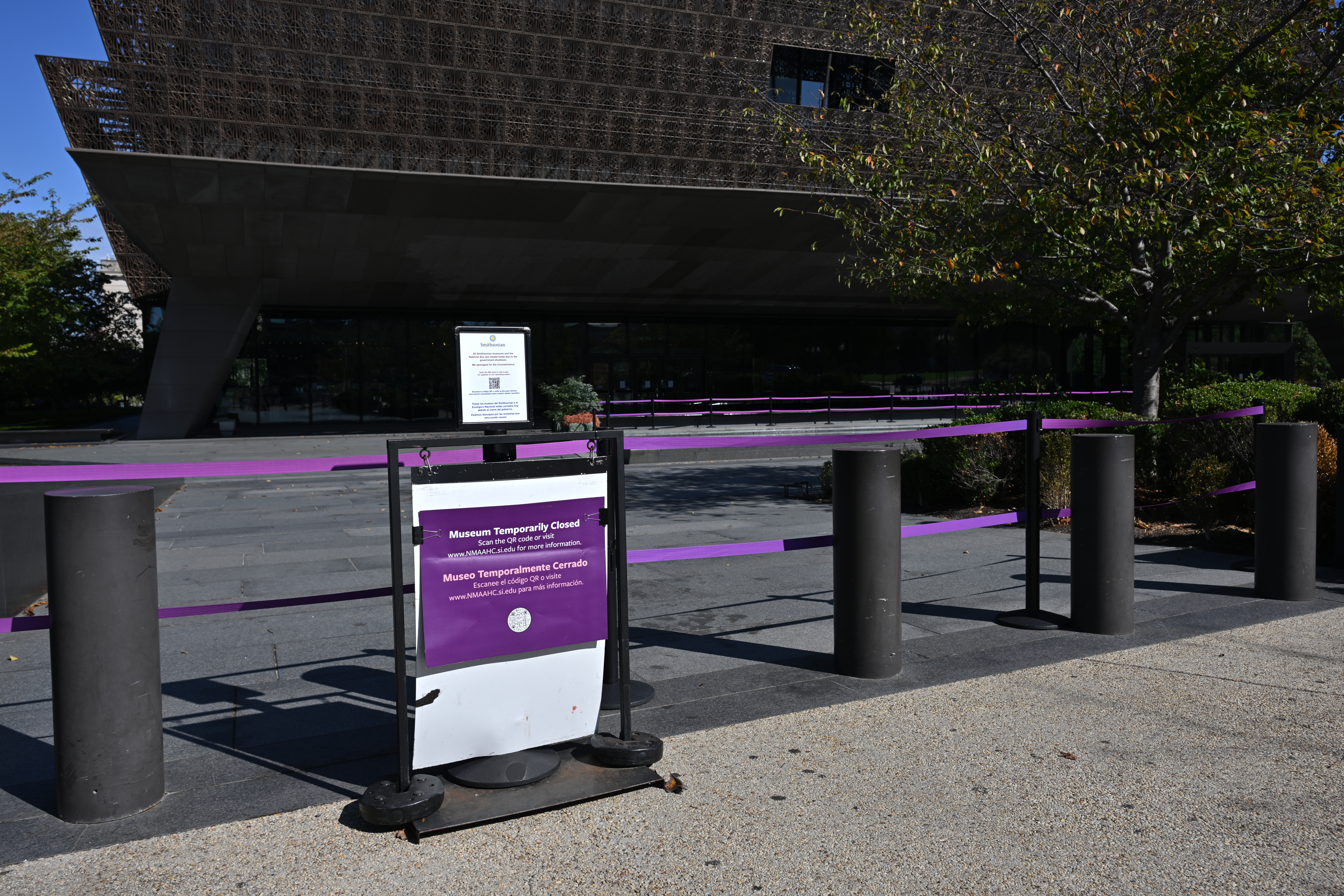
National Museum of African American History and Culture closed on October 15, 2025

According to a September 30 contingency plan by the Department of Interior, all national parks were to be left partially open during the shutdown, but any buildings that required staffing, such as visitor centers or sites such as the Washington Monument, would be closed to the public, with only restrooms open and trash collected as normal. Park roads, lookouts, trails and open-air memorials were expected to stay open with limited emergency services available to visitors. The plan was similar to the one adopted during the 2018–2019 government shutdown.

Some states, such as West Virginia, used state funding to keep their national parks open during the shutdown. In some areas, guide services saw an influx of business as visitors used the service as a stand-in for park rangers and workers. Private museums also saw a boost in visitors because national parks and museums were closed, with the Mount Vernon estate reporting a 50% increase in visitors during the first two weeks of October. The lack of visitors and paid entry into many national parks reportedly caused the loss of almost $25 million in revenue as of October 25. This figure is based on analysis by the National Parks Conservation Association, which reported that the National Park Service lost about $1 million a day.

Conservationists, the National Parks Conservation Association, and the National Park Service all issued warnings to the public to use caution or not to visit national parks during the shutdown due to concern about skeleton staffing making it difficult to assist in an emergency. Additional concern was raised about the mass layoffs shortly after Trump took office, which made many parks already short-staffed before the shutdown. Locals, furloughed workers, and local organizations worked together during the shutdown to keep national parks clean and well-kept.

As a result of the shutdown and lessened number of park rangers and workers, vandalism, unsanctioned and unsafe behavior was seen at a number of national parks across the country. At Arches National Park, a retired national park ranger discovered fresh white spray-painted graffiti and toilet paper on the park's sandstone features. Shortly into the shutdown multiple pictures and videos were posted of visitors to Yosemite National Park participating in illegal behavior such as BASE jumping from El Capitan and climbing the Half Dome cables without permits. Alleged squatters did not leave the park's campgrounds due to the lack of park rangers. There was a 70-acre wildfire near an unstaffed camping ground in Joshua Tree National Park and a historic stone wall fell over in Gettysburg National Military Park.

=== Technology ===
Suspension of non-essential functions of the Federal Communications Commission caused product delays for devices that emit radio frequencies, affecting the release of new cameras, speakers, and controllers.

=== Transportation ===
The Transportation Security Administration, Amtrak, ships, and cruises continued to function despite the shutdown. 95% of TSA employees were required to work during the shutdown.

Kristi Noem addressing the shutdown

Air travel still functioned, but air traffic controller hiring, field training of air traffic controllers, facility security inspections and law enforcement assistance support were stopped. Since October 1, air traffic controllers had been performing their duties without compensation, in addition to fulfilling mandatory overtime requirements. Since the shutdown many air traffic controllers had begun working odd jobs, gig work such as Uber and Doordash and other jobs in an attempt to cover expenses. Beginning on October 6, staffing shortages led to flight delays at various airports. On October 7, it was reported that cities such as Nashville, Dallas, Chicago, and Newark were seeing high levels of delays due to the air traffic controller shortage. The Hollywood Burbank Airport control tower was unstaffed for nearly six hours and then remotely managed due to shortages. By October 8, airport staffing shortages led to delays reported at Boston, Burbank, Chicago, Denver, Houston, Las Vegas, Nashville, Newark, Orlando, Philadelphia, Phoenix, and Washington.

On October 15, it was reported that multiple airports were rejecting the use of a video provided by Homeland Security Secretary Kristi Noem that blames Democrats for the shutdown and the resulting impact on TSA operations. Many airports rejected the video on the grounds that it violated their policies and regulations prohibiting political messaging at the airport.

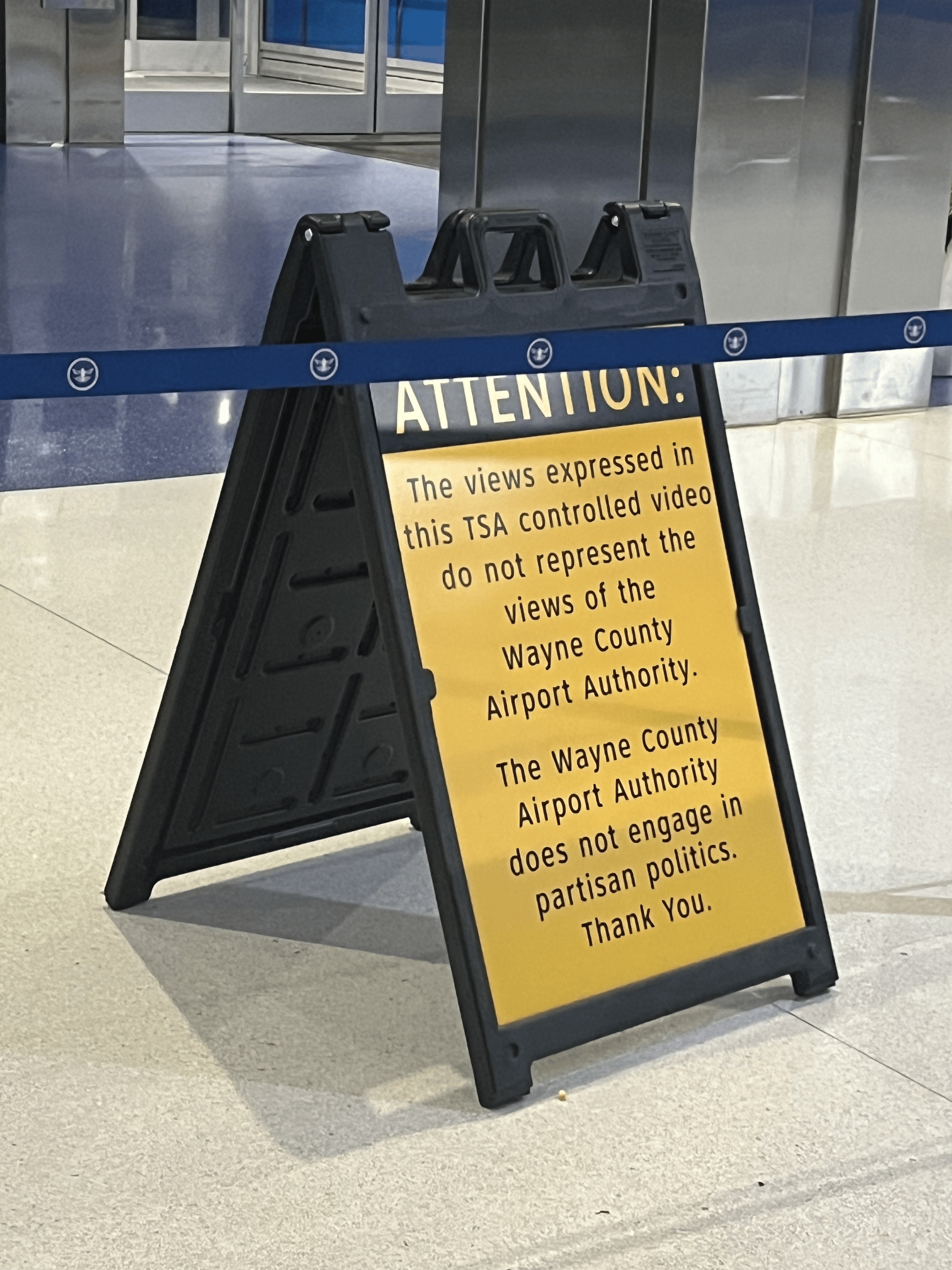
Detroit Metro Airport sign regarding the Kristi Noem video

On November 4, Transportation Secretary Sean Duffy said that the DOT and the Federal Aviation Administration (FAA) would begin to reduce flights at dozens of major airports and close sections of airspace due to staffing shortages beginning November 7. On November 5, Duffy announced that 40 airports, included in the "Core 30" high traffic airports, would cut airspace capacity by 10% starting November 7. Before his announcement, staffing shortages over the weekend of November 1–2 had led to major delays and concern about potential widespread travel chaos. During the week of November 3–7, NPR reporters spoke with some air traffic controllers who said morale was low even before the shutdown, with resentment at mandatory overtime and stagnating wages due to longstanding staffing issues. During the shutdown tens of thousands of flights were canceled nationwide after the FAA's flight reduction orders. On November 10, the FAA announced that they would prohibit "business aviation" or the use of private airplanes at about a dozen airports, on top of the previously implemented flight restrictions.

While speaking with reporters on November 9, Transportation Secretary Duffy stated that Secretary of Defense Pete Hegseth had offered air traffic controllers from the military reserves in order to help combat the shortage. Duffy explained his hesitancy as the offered air traffic controllers would have to be vetted to see what airspace they had previously worked in. A few days before the end of the government shutdown Trump argued while speaking with Fox News that air traffic controllers who took on second jobs and did not show up for work were to be docked pay, while those that came into work would be recommended for a $10,000 bonus. Trump did not elaborate where he would find the funds to make the payments but stated he wanted to reward those who showed up without complaining.

Ridership on the Washington Metro fell by 5% compared to the previous month, with the Federal Center SW, Capitol South, and Medical Center stations experiencing the largest drops, of 33.7%, 37.4%, and 32.1% respectively. Ridership on Capital Bikeshare fell by 13.9% compared to October 2024.

== Mass layoffs ==
On September 24, the Office of Management and Budget instructed federal agency heads to prepare reduction-in-force plans to be executed if the government were to shut down, reducing the government workforce permanently instead of temporarily furloughing staff. If conducted, such layoffs could have drastic and far-reaching consequences, especially in land management and environmental agencies. Democratic congressional leaders Chuck Schumer and Hakeem Jeffries called it "intimidation". One former OMB official and congressman, James Walkinshaw, questioned whether preparing or conducting a reduction in force during a shutdown would be legal, but as the practice is unprecedented, an executive at the Partnership for Public Service could not predict how it would play out.

On September 30, Trump told reporters that he was in favor of mass layoffs, saying, "We'd be laying off a lot of people that are going to be very affected, they're going to be Democrats" and "We can get rid of a lot of things that we didn't want."

=== Impacted ===
On October 1, the Trump administration dismissed all but four members of the National Council on the Humanities. Layoff notices were issued that day for 126 workers at the U.S. Patent and Trademark Office.

On October 10, over 4,100 federal workers were notified that they would be laid off. The Department of the Treasury had the most layoffs, with 1,446. Layoffs at the Department of Homeland Security included ones at the Cybersecurity and Infrastructure Security Agency. Other departments affected were Commerce, Education, Energy, and Housing and Urban Development, as well as the Environmental Protection Agency.

The Department of Health and Human Services (HHS) had the second-most layoffs, about 1,100. Nearly all of these were at the Centers for Disease Control and Prevention, including many in infectious disease programs, which had been largely spared in the April 2025 HHS layoffs. Other affected programs included the Laboratory Leadership Service and CDC Library, as well as leadership from several CDC components. (Note: Attributed to multiple sources:) The Washington Office was reported to be completely closed. Some layoff notices were reversed the next day after reportedly having been in error, including the entire staff of Morbidity and Mortality Weekly Report, recent cohorts of the Epidemic Intelligence Service, Ebola response personnel, and Global Health Center leadership. About 700 employees were reinstated to their positions on October 11.

=== Lawsuit ===
AFGE v. OMB
- Court: Northern District of California
- Full case name: American Federation of Government Employees v. U.S. Office of Management and Budget
- Started: September 30, 2025
- Docket nos.: 3:25-cv-08302

Case history
- Prior action: Motion for temporary restraining order granted

Outcome
- Ongoing

Court membership
- Judge sitting: Susan Yvonne Illston

On September 30, the American Federation of Government Employees and the American Federation of State, County and Municipal Employees sued in the federal District Court for the Northern District of California, seeking to prevent these mass layoffs. The labor unions alleged that any mass layoffs during the shutdown would be illegal, because the staff that would carry out the dismissals would be prevented from working due to the Antideficiency Act.

On October 15, U.S. district judge Susan Illston issued a restraining order against the Trump administration after siding with the two unions. The order is to be used to stop the government from issuing any reduction-in-force notices and her decision included instructions not to enforce any notices already sent to any of the agencies that have employees the unions represent.

On October 17, it was reported that the Trump administration had paused work on only a small number of those who were laid off to comply with Illston's order. The pause affected 465 Education Department employees, 102 Census Bureau employees, and more than 400 Department of Housing and Urban Development employees.

== Responses ==
=== Republicans ===
Several Republican officials and organizations, including President Donald Trump, Vice President JD Vance, the Senate Republican Conference, and Speaker of the House Mike Johnson, falsely accused Democrats of demanding free health care for undocumented immigrants, to whom the Affordable Care Act does not apply. This is based on Republican claims that there has been widespread fraud in Affordable Care Act enrollment. Independent reporters, analysts, and oversight bodies have disputed those claims or not substantiated them at their reported scale. (Note: Attributed to multiple sources:)

Most House representatives have left the Capitol at the direction of Mike Johnson. Representative Kevin Kiley of California has continued to work at the Capitol in an effort to end the shutdown. Kiley told reporters that he was looking for "any and all constructive conversations" to end the shutdown, saying, "Clearly, it's not working...Sometimes you have to work with people who have a different position in order to find common ground."

==== Trump administration ====
After the unsuccessful back-to-back votes, Trump told reporters that Senate Democrats "want to shut down the country", except John Fetterman, who voted for the Republican spending bill. After he met with Senate minority leader Chuck Schumer and House minority leader Hakeem Jeffries, Trump posted a controversial deepfake, AI-generated video of Schumer and Jeffries with fabricated audio of Schumer saying that Democrats "have no voters anymore, because of our woke, trans bullshit" and "if we give all these illegal aliens health care, we might be able to get them on our side so they can vote for us." In an interview with Politico's Dasha Burns, Trump called Democrats "deranged".

Trump posted that the shutdown was an "unprecedented opportunity" and that he would meet "with Russ Vought, he of Project 2025 Fame, to determine which of the many Democrat Agencies, most of which are a political SCAM, he recommends to be cut". During the shutdown, the administration halted billions in approved funding largely going to states that had voted for Kamala Harris in the 2024 presidential election, including $20 billion for public transport in New York City and Chicago. (Note: Attributed to multiple sources:)

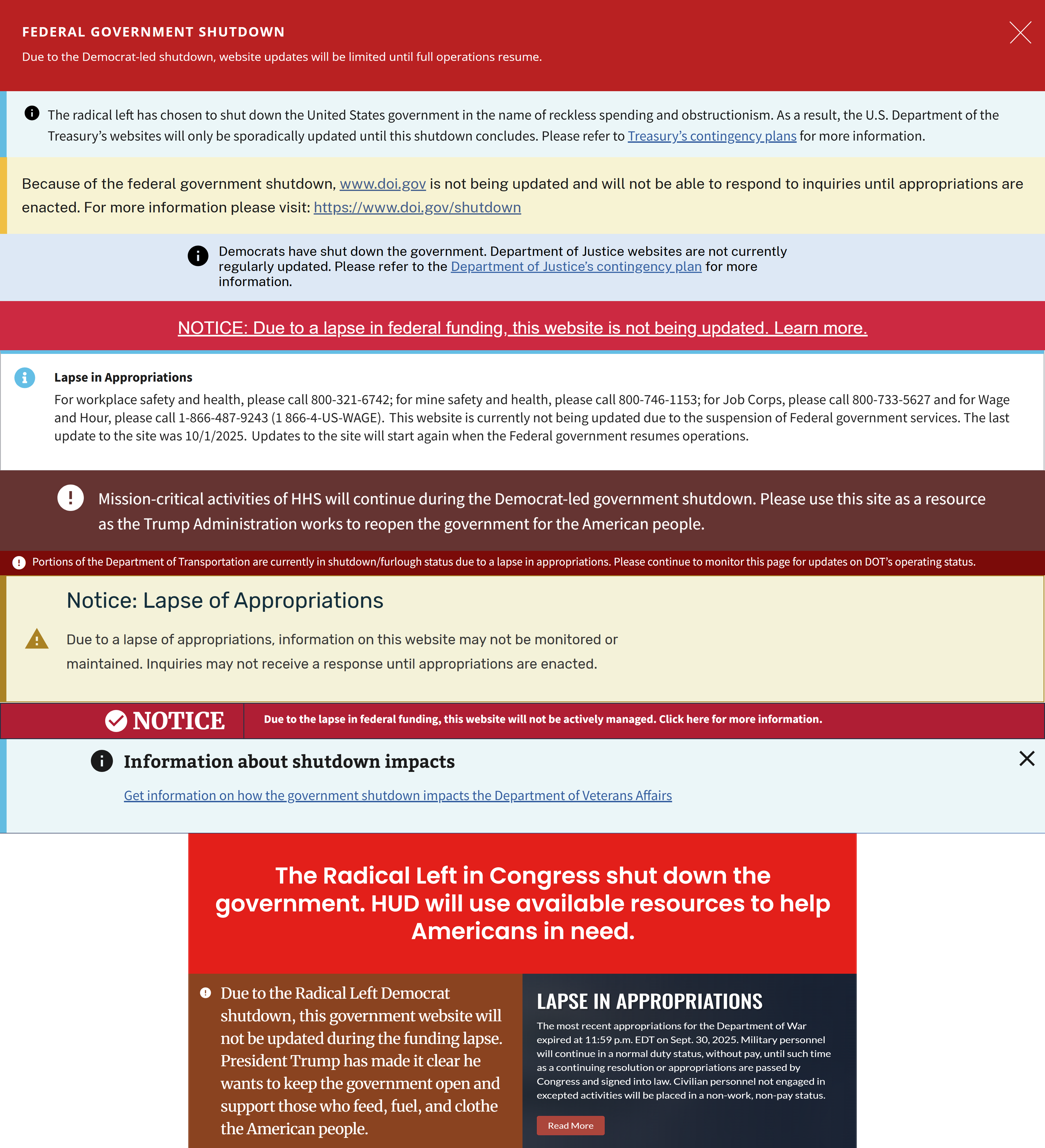
Notification of the government shutdown on each U.S. federal executive department's website

Before and during the shutdown, government websites and emails blamed Democrats and the "radical left" for it, actions some claim were illegal. Hours before the shutdown was set to begin, the Department of Housing and Urban Development's website warned, in a pop-up and a red banner, that the radical left would hurt the United States, and Department of Health and Human Services encouraged its employees to set out-of-office email messages blaming the Democratic Party for the shutdown. In a statement, the department said: "Employees were instructed to use out-of-office messages that reflect the truth: Democrats have shut the government down."

The United States Department of Agriculture (USDA)'s notice later included claims that the shutdown was being perpetuated by Senate Democrats who continued "to hold out for healthcare for illegal aliens and gender mutilation procedures", the latter stemming from the administration's ongoing scapegoating of transgender rights in the United States.

===== First Amendment violation =====
At the Department of Education, employees' out-of-office messages were forcibly changed to political ones and they were unable to remove the partisan messaging:

Thank you for contacting me. On September 19, 2025, the House of Representatives passed HR 5371, a clean continuing resolution. Unfortunately, Democrat Senators are blocking the passage of HR 5371 in the Senate, which has led to a lapse in appropriations. Due to the lapse in appropriations, I am currently in furlough status. I will respond to emails once government functions resume.

In early November 2025, it was ruled that the Department of Education violated the First Amendment rights of the furloughed workers by "commandeering" their out of office messages to "broadcast partisan messages". The ruling applies only to Department of Education workers.

=== Democrats ===
Democrats proposed a constant livestream to discuss the shutdown. The night before the shutdown, many politicians, including Representative Sarah McBride and Senator Andy Kim, posted on social media and told the media that their Republican counterparts were not in the Capitol to vote on the budget. Representative Robert Garcia said the messages placed on government agency websites blaming Democrats for the shutdown violated the Hatch Act. Senator Bernie Sanders and Representative Alexandria Ocasio-Cortez held a town hall on CNN to discuss the shutdown.

After eight Senate Democrats voted with Republicans to end the shutdown, Senate minority leader Chuck Schumer faced calls to resign from members of his party who felt that he had allowed the Democrats to vote with the Republicans. While none of those calling for his resignation are from his caucus, some in his caucus are reportedly frustrated by the perceived lack of a plan during the shutdown to secure any serious concessions from Republicans.

=== Former government officials ===
House speaker Mike Johnson addresses the shutdown (October 1, 2025).

In a letter to Secretary of the Interior Doug Burgum, over 35 former park superintendents urged the parks managed by the National Park Service to close to avoid damage by unsupervised visitors.

=== Public opinion ===
In most surveys regarding US government shutdowns, Republicans have received more blame than Democrats, though a substantial portion of survey respondents said they were not sure.

==== Pre-shutdown ====
A poll conducted by Data for Progress from September 5 to 7 asked likely voters whom they would blame for a potential shutdown at the end of the month. 27% of respondents thought Republicans in Congress would be responsible, 32% expected to blame Trump personally, and 34% placed the blame on Democrats in Congress. Two days before the shutdown, a poll by Morning Consult indicated 45% of voters said they would blame Republicans and 32% said they would blame Democrats.

In a September 22 to 27 poll by The New York Times and Siena University, 26% of respondents blamed the Trump and Republican Party for the shutdown, compared to 19% who blamed the Democratic Party and 33% who blamed both parties. Another question asked whether Democrats should shut down the government if their demands were not met; 27% of respondents said yes and 65% no.

In a September 30 poll by NPR, 38% of respondents blamed the Republican Party for the shutdown, compared to 27% who blamed the Democratic Party, 31% who blamed both parties, and 1% who blamed neither. Another NPR poll conducted days earlier, which controlled for political affiliation, indicated that while Democrats and Republicans were more likely to blame each other for a hypothetical shutdown, independent voters were most likely to blame both.

In a poll conducted by KFF from September 23 to 29, 78% of respondents supported extending Affordable Care Act tax credits, and 61% of respondents had heard little or nothing about the expiring subsidies.

==== During the shutdown ====
An October 1 poll from The Washington Post indicated that 47% of respondents believed that Trump and Republicans in Congress were mainly responsible for the shutdown, compared to the 30% who blamed Democrats in Congress. This was consistent with polls regarding past shutdowns in the last 30 years, including the month-long shutdown during the first Trump presidency: according to polls, public opinion blamed Republicans more than Democrats with a difference of +10% or higher for every shutdown since 1995.

An October 1–2 Harvard CAPS/Harris poll showed 65% of respondents felt the Democrats should accept a continuing resolution at current spending levels, but the same poll showed 53% of respondents blamed Republicans. An October 1–3 CBS News poll via YouGov asked a multitude of questions. 39% of respondents blamed Trump and Republicans for the shutdown, compared to the 30% who blamed Democrats and 31% who blamed both parties equally. Respondents felt that Trump, Republicans, and Democrats were handling the shutdown poorly at 52%, 52%, and 49%, respectively. An October 2–7 Reuters/IPSOS poll found that 67% of respondents said that Republicans deserved a fair amount of the blame for the shutdown, compared to 63% who blamed Democrats. About 63% of respondents said that Trump deserved a fair amount of blame.

An October 9–13 AP-NORC poll found that nine in ten adults felt the federal shutdown was at least a "minor" problem. Democrats were more concerned, with 69% saying the shutdown was a major problem compared to 37% of Republicans. Over half the respondents, 58%, blamed the shutdown on both Trump and the Republicans, with Congressional Democrats blamed by 54%.

An October 24–28 Washington Post-ABC News-IPSOS poll found that more than 4 in 10 U.S. adults, about 45%, held Trump and Republicans primarily responsible for the shutdown. Blame for the Democrats had grown from 30% when the shutdown began to 33% in the latter poll. Three out of four U.S. adults said they were "very" or "somewhat" concerned about the shutdown; the figure was 87% among self-described liberals and 62% among self-described conservatives.

A poll conducted by NBC News from October 24 to 28 found that 52% of respondents blamed Trump and Republicans while 42% blamed Democrats.

On October 30, the shutdown's 30th day, an ABC News/Washington Post/Ipsos poll found that 45% of respondents blamed Republicans, 33% blamed Democrats, and 22% were uncertain.

On November 7, YouGov published a comparative analysis of poll results by YouGov and The Economist in October and November. It found that 32% blamed Democrats in Congress, 35% blamed Republicans, and 28% blamed both parties equally. Republicans originally took the brunt of the blame for the shutdown in the October 17-20 poll, with 39% of Americans blaming them for the shutdown as opposed to 31% for Democrats. But by November, 35% blamed Republicans and 32% Democrats, and the proportion choosing "both sides to blame" was rising rapidly. Even as voters blamed Republicans for the shutdown, the net approval for congressional Democrats' handling of the situation remained lower than or equal to the net approval for congressional Republicans' handling. Trump's approval rating also declined.

In Navigator Research's surveys taken during the shutdown, the target of respondents' blame changed by only a couple of points, with 45% blaming Trump and Republicans in an October 5 poll and 48% on November 9. Democrats were held responsible by 32% of those surveyed on October 5, compared with 34% on November 9. Among independents, 46% blamed Trump and Republicans, and only 24% blamed Democrats (dates were not given for this data set).

=== Operational criticism ===
When the Trump administration rolled out spending freezes across the entire federal government, fiscal and monetary analyst Nathan Tankus commented that the freeze was "the most dramatic event ever" in the annals of constitutional law on fiscal policy in the U.S., arguing that the Oval Office's pertinent executive orders essentially give the president "far greater control" over Congress's authority to spend.

Tankus delineated the "extremely unique" legal architecture of the U.S. government. In countries with a parliamentary system, the government can "fall apart" or even lose its mandate to govern if its parliament cannot pass a budget. In the U.S., tax revenue typically goes into the general fund, an accounting fact that does not mean the government spends any additional money. Tankus concludes that, while the Trump administration has been "circumspect and legalistic" about spending without appropriations, it has also been "brazen" in ignoring congressional orders to spend.
