= SNAP during the 2025 U.S. federal government shutdown =

Cessation of a federal government program

Massachusetts v. USDA
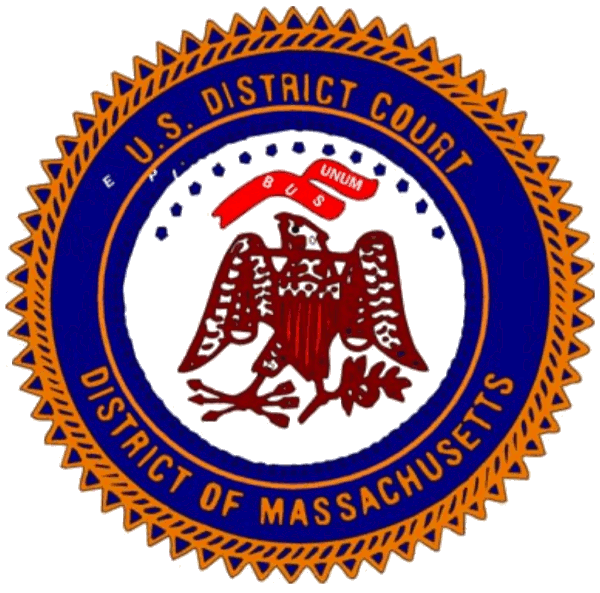
- Court: District of Massachusetts
- Full case name: Massachusetts, California, Arizona, Minnesota, Connecticut, Colorado, Delaware, District of Columbia, Hawai'i, Illinois, Governor Laura Kelly, Office of Governor Andy Beshear, Maine, Maryland, Michigan, Nevada, New Jersey, New Mexico, State of New York, North Carolina, Oregon, Governor Josh Shapiro, Rhode Island, Vermont, State of Washington, Wisconsin v. United States Department of Agriculture, Secretary Brooke Rollins, Director Russell Vought
- Started: October 28, 2025
- Docket nos.: 1:25-cv-13165

Outcome
- Ongoing

Court membership
- Judge sitting: Indira Talwani

Rhode Island State Council of Churches v. Rollins
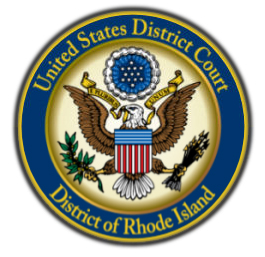
- Court: District of Rhode Island
- Full case name: Rhode Island State Council of Churches v. Rollins
- Started: October 30, 2025
- Docket nos.: 1:25-cv-00569 (D.R.I.); 25-2089 (1st Cir.); 25A539 (SCOTUS)

Outcome
- Ongoing

Court membership
- Judge sitting: John J. McConnell Jr.

In 2025, during the United States government shutdown, disbursements to the Supplemental Nutrition Assistance Program (SNAP), which serves 1 in 8 of all Americans, ceased beginning on 1 November. Federal litigation and gubernatorial (state) action immediately ensued amidst fears of widespread hunger. The pause on SNAP benefits highlights challenges faced by both government institutions as well as the participants of the program, including the increased reliance on local food banks as well as uncertainty among low-income households.

== Background ==
In 2025, following the lead of the newly-reelected Trump administration, the House of Representatives moved for a new budget resolution that cuts funding to an array of social programs such as the Supplemental Nutrition Assistance Program (SNAP) and Medicaid. Passed in a resolution of 217 to 215, the cuts are part of an effort to allow a $4.5 trillion tax cut. Nonprofits such as No Kid Hungry have taken to social media using the hashtag #protectSNAP to raise awareness about the potential cuts.

SNAP is authorized by the Food and Nutrition Act of 2008. This law, formerly the Food Stamp Act of 1977, has since 1973 been periodically reauthorized under the protection of the omnibus farm bill; and the program was last so reauthorized by the 2018 farm bill. For programs with mandatory spending authorized but not appropriated by the farm bill—such as SNAP—an appropriations act or continuing resolution could allow operations to continue. Numerous farm bill provisions expired in 2023 which were extended in this manner through September 30, 2025. In the event of farm bill expiration, SNAP operations had heretofore been continued with the provision of appropriations.

Food banks and pantries around the United States have experienced crowds of people in need of food on top of the Trump administration ending programs that provided more than $1 billion for schools and services that aided with food assistance earlier in 2025. It is especially difficult for charitable food services such as these to operate because they are intended to be a supplement to federal food assistance, not to replace these programs. According to Feeding American, out of every 9 meals provided by SNAP, 1 is given out by a food pantry, which only worsens with the increased demand.

== November shutdown ==
In October 2025, it was announced that November's SNAP payments would not be disbursed as a consequence of the 2025 U.S. federal government shutdown, affecting 42 million Americans, 1.4 million of whom were federal employees who were furloughed or working without pay.

Food banks in Florida, Arizona, and North Carolina reported having to turn patrons away just before SNAP was put on hiatus. States with food banks that were still able to feed people were only barely able to feed everyone who came by. The only reason that pantries in other states such as Virginia are able to stay afloat is because of donors.

In response, states such as Louisiana, Vermont, and New Mexico have announced plans to still support local food pantries by expediting emergency funds to support them. State officials from Oklahoma planned to hold a vote that would give $1 million in funding to local food banks, however, this is a fraction of what actually would be needed.

== Federal court rulings ==
However, two federal judges—Judge John J. McConnell Jr. of Rhode Island and Judge Indira Talwani of Massachusetts ruled on October 31, 2025, that the Trump administration must fund food stamps during November.

As of Saturday, 1 November, however, even as new restrictions had been promulgated (part and parcel of the Big Beautiful Bill), funding was still not forthcoming.

Presentations were made to both judges (in response to their orders to detail the procedures to be enacted) by attorneys from the Trump administration by noon (EST) Monday, 3 November. Judge John McConnell heard from Patrick Penn, who oversees the SNAP program at the Department of Agriculture, that there were "procedural difficulties" which would take some states weeks or even months to overcome. The upshot was that SNAP would be partially emergency funded through November by 50%, with food banks expecting an increase in patronage for the first week and grocery stores a decrease. (The funding was later increased to 65%.)

== Appeals and Supreme Court involvement ==
On Thursday, 6 November, Judge McConnell, in light of a Truth Social post by President Trump that SNAP would not be resumed until the government shutdown itself ended, orally ordered the Trump administration to fully fund SNAP on the next day, Friday, 7 November. The administration immediately appealed.

On Friday, 7 November, the Department of Agriculture (USDA) released a memo that it would fully fund SNAP. The status of the appeal was unclear. Minnesota announced that its SNAP recipients would receive their full funding within days (some as soon as the weekend). Wisconsin reported that some recipients were fully funded overnight. Hawaii was also fully funded. (Each state sets its own options for SNAP disbursements according to its needs.) California, Kansas, New Jersey, Pennsylvania, and Washington state soon followed suit; Colorado and Massachusetts were only able to serve a portion of their citizenry due to timing issues.

The Trump administration in its brief for an emergency stay to the Supreme Court noted that "there is no ready mechanism for the [federal] government to recover those funds" that have already been distributed, and characterized the order as "a mockery of the separation of powers." Supreme Court Justice Ketanji Brown Jackson issued an administrative stay, thus giving the Boston-based 1st U.S. Circuit Court of Appeals time to rule on the administration's request to partially fund SNAP. Her order remains in place until 48 hours after the appeals court rules.

== Resolution and reinstatement ==
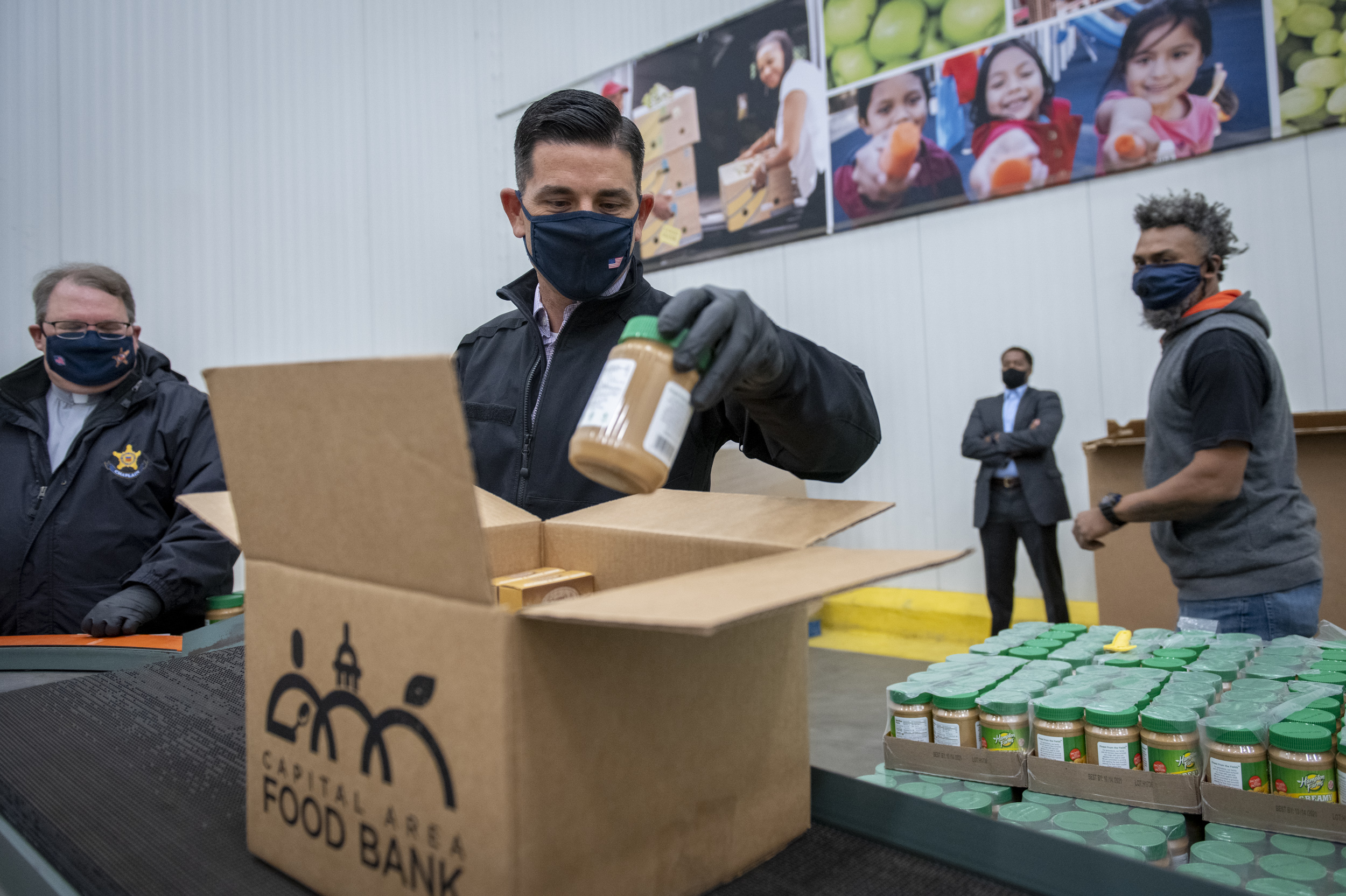
Secretary Chad Wolf volunteers at the Capital Area Food Bank during the COVID-19 pandemic.

On Saturday, 9 November, in a memo following the emergency stay, the USDA told those states which had disbursed SNAP funds in full (or were planning to do so) that they would have to immediately take back those funds from any recipients and reverse such plans, only partial funding having been authorized. "Failure to comply with this memorandum may result in USDA taking various actions, including cancellation of the Federal share of state administrative costs and holding states liable for any overissuances that result from the noncompliance," the guidance threatened. Massachusetts Governor Maura Healey threatened legal action. Wisconsin Governor Tony Evers wrote on X that his response was a simple "no".

On Sunday, 10 November, the Senate passed a procedural measure towards ending the shutdown, the attempted USDA claw-back of the full disbursement of SNAP funds by some states having added to the pressure. With a provision to extend SNAP until October 2026, it awaits an eventual vote in the House once the House reopens.

On Monday, 11 November, the Supreme Court extended its stay, continuing to block full SNAP payments.

On Thursday, 13 November, following the end of the government shutdown, Secretary of Agriculture Brooke Rollins said that benefits would be reinstated in full by Monday. (She noted however that "it is the 50 states and 50 different infrastructures that move that money out".) Federally, the SNAP shutdown was over, and the court cases moot.

Mississippi cited technical issues with releasing the full benefits immediately. It began releasing the funds on 21 November.

== Impact and public response ==
The shutdown exposed vulnerabilities in the nation's food assistance systems and significantly increased reliance on food banks and charitable organizations. Advocacy groups and nonprofits wanted to spark awareness through campaigns such as #protectSNAP which helps people that are at risk of hunger connect with resources to obtain food such as the WhyHunger Hotline.

== See also ==
- Big Beautiful Bill
- 2025 U.S. federal government shutdown
