= Rock for a Remedy =

Rock for a Remedy (RFAR) is an organization based in the United States, established in 2003. RFAR partners with local food relief organizations and national touring artists to both gather food/monetary donations and encourage youth and adults to better their communities through charitable efforts. Food drives at tour stops directly benefit the local communities where the concert is taking place. Some food banks that have been supported include: Northeast Iowa Food Bank and the Capital Area Food Bank. Artists who have worked with Rock for a Remedy include Matt Nathanson, Guster, and Brett Dennen.

RFAR is a non-profit bringing together socially conscious musicians and their civic-minded fans via food drives all across North America, with all donations given to area food banks in local communities. Audiences have passionately responded to the food drive revolution, providing the nearly 100 tons of food and many thousands of dollars over RFAR’s history. Each food drive directly benefits the community in which the concert is held. 100% of donations remain with the benefiting food bank or feeding program.

- Summer 2007: Rock for a Remedy has engaged in its first tour with Dave Matthews Band and will be on the duration of the tour.
- Summer 2009: Rock for a Remedy has partnered with Indigo Girls and will be at each tour stop throughout the summer.
- Summer 2018: Rock for a Remedy will partner with Melissa Etheridge to support Summer Food Programs, which are among the most critical services offered to children in food insecure families.

Over the years, participating artists have included: Indigo Girls, Dave Matthews Band, Guster, Dispatch, Michael Franti & Spearhead, Santana, Blues Traveler, Brett Dennen, Barenaked Ladies, Maroon 5, Gavin Degraw, Tristan Prettyman, O.A.R., Matt Nathanson, Damien Rice, Grace Potter and the Nocturnals, Ray Lamontagne, The Tings Tings, State Radio, Train, Matt York, Jason Mraz, Third Eye Blind, Mieka Pauley, Stephen Kellogg and the Sixers.
