= Nathan Tankus =

American economist and writer

- Born: 1992 (age 33–34); New York, New York, US
- Occupation: Financial analyst
- Known for: State finances & Federal Reserve operations analysis

Academic background
- Influences: Frederic Sterling Lee; Hyman Minsky; Keynes
- Website: Notes on the Crises

Nathan Cedric Tankus is an American expert on state and banking finances, with a focus on the Federal Reserve. He has been a visiting researcher at the Fields Institute and a research assistant at the University of Ottawa. He has written for the Financial Times, Business Insider, the Review of Keynesian Economics, Truthout, Jacobin, Naked Capitalism, and Rolling Stone.

== Early life and education ==
Tankus, born in New York, in 1992, to father Morton Tankus, finished the Urban Academy Laboratory High School and went on to study Economics first at Wells College, which he left to continue at the University of Ottawa and then came back to New York's John Jay College. He left before getting his bachelor's degree and began studying and pursuing, on his own, research on Economics and Finance. He is an active participant of the Modern Monetary Theory community of economists, commentators, and analysts.

== Career ==
In 2018, he was invited by Harvard's Christine A. Desan to an inter-disciplinary conference, titled "Money as a Democratic Medium," where he presented the paper "The Shaky Constitutional Foundations of Antebellum American Money: Bank Charters as Delegations of Power."

In early 2020, with the onset of the coronavirus pandemic, he began an online newsletter, titled Notes on the Crises, which would report and analyze the economic impact of the pandemic and the measures taken by the US government to address the resulting instability, offering suggestions as to the operational measures available to the federal system. The newsletter caught on, with Bloomberg News subsequently characterizing him as a "must-read," and inviting him to "explain and contextualize the historic nature of the Fed's ... dramatic steps to arrest the crisis" on its podcast. David Beckworth, senior research fellow at the Mercatus Center of George Mason University, opined on Tankus for his reporting that he shows "really good knowledge of the plumbing of the monetary system."

In April 2020, Tankus warned against budget cuts at the state level, pointing out that, while the "government [is seemingly] ...handing out money like crazy these days," in reference to the $2.2 trillion stimulus bill, states seem keen to cut down on spending. He predicted that, if, as announced, the cuts were to be effected, the nation could enter into a recession. He singled out New York state's cuts that were concentrated in healthcare, labeling them "shocking."

In a series of articles published in 2025 in Rolling Stone, he addressed what he viewed as the Trump administration's over-reach in accessing bank accounts of citizens, ostensibly in search of criminal activity, as well as the "extreme danger" in allowing Elon Musk and DOGE access to Federal Reserve computer code. In two interviews to Paul Krugman, Tankus, whom Krugman characterized as "an expert on the financial 'plumbing' at the Federal Reserve and the Treasury Department," outlined what he called "the DOGE's depredations at government agencies" and the ongoing "disruptions in financial markets." In a March 28, 2025, New York Times op-ed reviewing DOGE's "misleading" claims about government spending and their access to the Treasury's computer systems, Tankus was quoted as asserting that "the primary barrier to Elon Musk gaining control of the Treasury payments system is COBOL," a computer language that Krugman wrote "hardly anyone under 60 knows how to program."

== Personal life ==
He has declared an intention to return to his formal studies and go for a PhD in Law at the University of Manchester in the UK, stating, "I realized these debates about the origins of money and so on couldn't be settled within Economics. There are legal and historical questions."

== Articles ==
- Fullwiler, Scott; Grey, Rohan; Tankus, Nathan (March 1, 2019). "An MMT Response on What Causes Inflation". FT Alphaville. Financial Times.
- Tankus, Nathan (October 15, 2021). "The case for minting a $1tn coin to deal with America's debt ceiling". The Guardian.
- Tankus, Nathan (February 9, 2022). "The New Monetary Policy: Re-Imagining Demand Management and Price Stability in the 21st Century" (PDF). Modern Monetary Network.
- Tankus, Nathan; Herrine, Luke (May 2022). "Competition Law as Collective Bargaining Law". In Paul, Sanjukta; McCrystal, Shae; McGaughey, Ewan (eds.). The Cambridge Handbook of Labor in Competition Law. Cambridge Law Handbooks. Cambridge University Press. ISBN 9781108909570.

== See also ==
- History of the Federal Reserve System
