= Alexandra Lahav =

American lawyer and academic

- Occupation: Law professor

Academic background
- Education: B.A., Brown University (1993) J.D., Harvard Law School (1998)
- Alma mater: Harvard Law School

Academic work
- Discipline: Law
- Sub-discipline: Civil procedure, tort law
- Institutions: Cornell Law School
- Website: alexandralahav.com

Alexandra Devorah Lahav is an American lawyer and academic specializing in litigation and civil procedure. She is the Anthony W. and Lulu C. Wang Professor of Law at Cornell Law School.

== Career ==
Lahav studied history and graduated from Brown University with honors in 1993. She then studied at Harvard Law School, where she earned her J.D. magna cum laude. During law school, she worked as a summer associate at Debevoise & Plimpton, She then clerked for Justice Alan B. Handler on the Supreme Court of New Jersey for a year. In 1999, she joined Emery Cuty Brinckerhoff & Abady, a boutique litigation law firm in New York City. She has previously been selected as a Radcliffe fellow. In 2019, she won the Civil Justice Scholarship Award for her book, In Praise of Litigation.

== Selected works ==
=== Books ===
- Lahav, Alexandra (January 2, 2017). In Praise of Litigation. Oxford: Oxford University Press. ISBN 9780199380817.

=== Journal Articles ===
- Lahav, Alexandra (April 2008). "Bellwether Trials". George Washington Law Review. 76 (576): 576–638 - via HeinOnline.
- Lahav, Alexandra (2003). "Fundamental Principles for Class Action Governance". Indiana Law Review. 37 (65): 65-140 - via HeinOnline.
