= Administrative stay =

Type of judicial ruling

An administrative stay or temporary stay is a short-term stay issued by a court while it is considering a request for a longer stay. A stay stops a previous legal ruling from taking effect until more legal proceedings have taken place, such as an appeal. It is a type of interim relief. It can be used to stop a previous judgment from violating rights or destroying property.

== By country ==
=== United States ===
Administrative stays are sometimes used in cases involving requests for emergency relief to temporarily preserve the status quo while the court considers the request. In a March 2024 concurring opinion, Justice Amy Coney Barrett approved the use of appellate administrative stays as flexible, short-term measures that preserve the status quo while a court considers a motion for a stay pending appeal, emphasizing that they should last no longer than necessary. By August 2024, the concept had been adopted by a district court in Texas v. Department of Homeland Security, which used an "administrative stay" to suspend a Department of Homeland Security rule for several months without applying the traditional requirements for temporary restraining orders or preliminary injunctions under Federal Rules of Civil Procedure Rule 65.

Some scholars have criticized administrative stays as lacking the regularity, publicity, stability, and impartiality ordinarily associated with the rule of law. Alexandra D. Lahav argued that issuing administrative stays without explaining the court's reasoning can invite public speculation about the basis for the decision, particularly in politically contentious cases, potentially undermining confidence in the judiciary.

== Works cited ==
- Lahav, Alexandra D. (2025-10-12). "Emergency Injunctions under Democratic Government: Public Justification for Contested Outcomes". Cornell Legal Studies Research Paper.
