= Capital Area Food Bank =

Nonprofit organization in Washington, D.C., U.S.

Coordinates: 38.9476123°N 76.9999024°W

Capital Area Food Bank Inc
- Formation: October 24, 1979
- Type: 501(c)(3) nonprofit organization
- Tax ID no.: 52-11677581
- Headquarters: Michigan Park, Washington, D.C.
- Region served: Washington metropolitan area
- Services: Hunger relief, nutrition education, healthy food access
- Founder and former President: Lynn Brantley (1980–2012)
- Former President and CEO: Nancy Roman (2013–2017)
- President and CEO: Radha Muthiah (2018– )
- Board Chairman: Peter Schnall
- Parent organization: Feeding America
- Subsidiaries: Capital Area Food Bank Foundation
- Revenue: $53,559,173 (2014)
- Expenses: $59,912,375 (2014)
- Staff: 153 (2013)
- Volunteers: 21,000 (2013)
- Website: capitalareafoodbank.org

The Capital Area Food Bank is the largest organization in the Washington metro area working to solve hunger and its companion problems: chronic undernutrition, heart disease, diabetes, and obesity. By partnering with over 450 community organizations in the District of Columbia, Maryland, and Virginia, as well as delivering food directly into hard to reach areas, each year the Capital Area Food Bank is helping nearly half a million people each year get access to good, healthy food.

In fiscal year 2015, the food bank provided nearly 45 million pounds of food—the equivalent of 36 million meals—to the region. In addition to food, the food bank also provides nutrition education and cooking classes, empowering those it serves with the information and skills to shop for and cook healthy meals on a budget.

Counties served by Capital Area Food Bank include Washington, D.C.; Montgomery, Maryland; Prince George's, Maryland; Arlington, Virginia; Fairfax, Virginia; Prince William, Virginia; Alexandria (City), Virginia; Fairfax (City), Virginia; Falls Church (City), Virginia; Manassas (City), Virginia; and Manassas Park (City), Virginia.

The Capital Area Food Bank operates with the assistance of 21,000 volunteers annually, who donate their time to help sort food, teach classes, and perform other important functions for the food bank. The food bank is a member of Feeding America.

== History ==
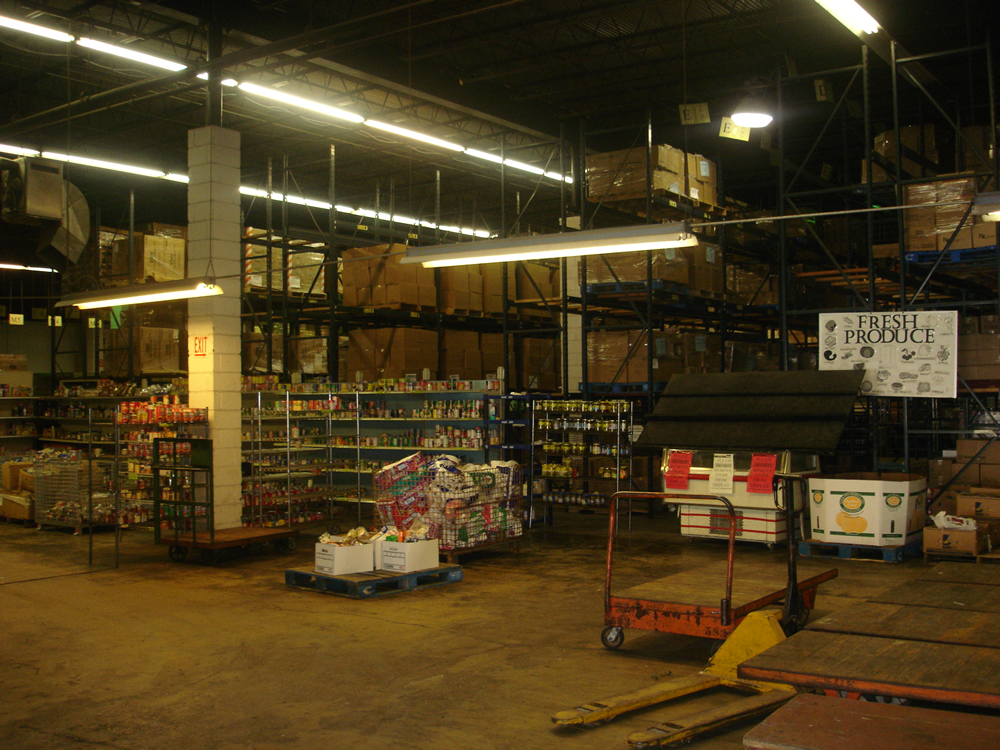
The Capital Area Food Bank's warehouse of Northeast Washington

The Capital Area Food Bank was officially incorporated on October 24, 1979, but it considers its founding date to be January 15, 1980, coinciding with Martin Luther King Jr.'s fifty-first birthday. Prior to that time, the United States government's Food Stamp Program had been the city's primary source of assisting hungry residents. However, cutbacks in the Food Stamp Program planned for the early 1980s led to the food bank's inception by two local organizations, the United Planning Organization and the Interfaith Conference of Metropolitan Washington. In its first year of operation, the food bank managed to offer food to almost one hundred organizations and deliver 1,540 pounds (700 kilograms) of food each month. Throughout the rest of the 1980s, the Capital Area Food Bank proceeded to prosper as it partnered with nearby corporations, such as The Washington Post.

In 1991, the Capital Area Food Bank opened a new warehouse in the Brookland neighborhood in northeast Washington, D.C. The new 48,000-square-foot (4,500 m^{2}) warehouse is more than three times as large as the food bank's original 14,000-square-foot (1,300 m^{2}) warehouse and continues to serve the Capital Area Food Bank today.

In 1998, the food bank opened another warehouse, in Lorton, Virginia, which has since served the needs of residents of Northern Virginia.

In 2004, the first ever Blue Jeans Ball – then called the Farmer's Blue Jeans Ball – was held at Catholic University.

In 1981, just over one million pounds (460,000 kilograms) were processed by the Capital Area Food Bank. Less than 25 years later, in 2005, the food bank outputs over 20 million pounds (9 million kilograms) of food to over 275,000 people, making it the largest food bank in the area.

In 2007, the Capital Area Food Bank distributed 20 million pounds of food and served approximately 383,000 people in the Washington metro area.

In 2012, the Capital Area Food Bank moved to the Bedford Falls Foundation Distribution Center, allowing the organization to dramatically increase its distribution of good food and expand its education spaces.

In 2013, the 8,000-square foot Urban Demonstration Garden, a food growing and education space housed behind the food bank, finished its first season.

In 2014, the Capital Area Food Bank increased its reach to 540,300 people with 42 million pounds of food. The newly launched Fruits and Vegetables Fund for Greater Washington, through which the food bank contract grows fresh produce with local farmers, concluded its first full growing season with support from the J. Willard and Alice S. Marriott Foundation.

In 2016, the food bank put a new food acceptance policy in place that prioritizes foods lower in sugar and salt and higher in fiber. With help from its retailers, junk food donations dropped by 84% in one year.

== Political importance ==
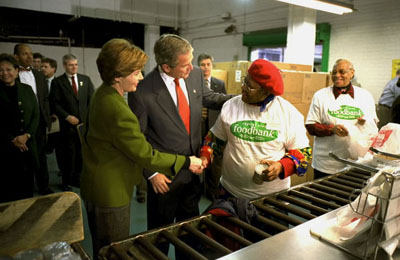
U.S. president George W. Bush visits the Capital Area Food Bank's Washington warehouse in 2002.

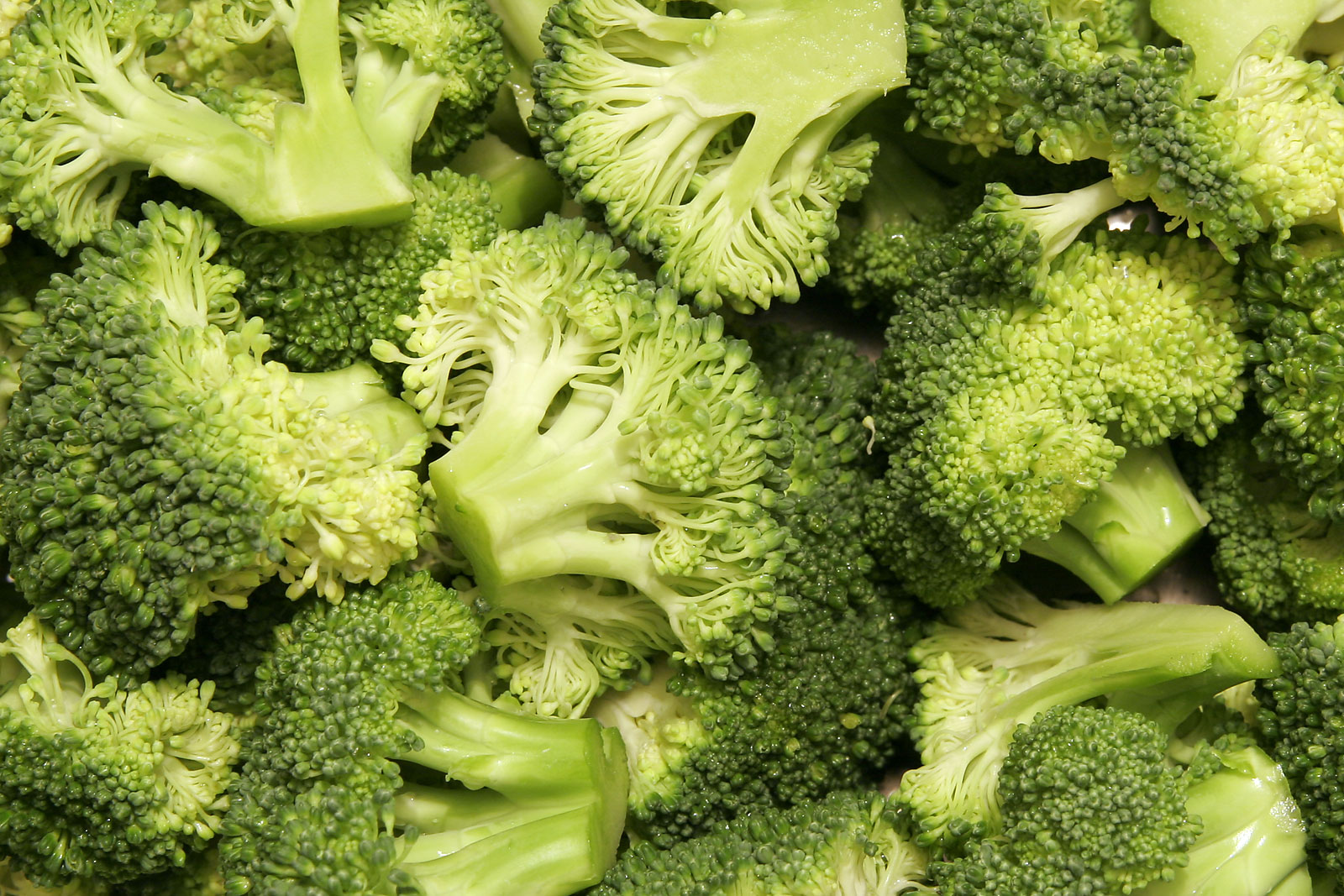
About ten tons of broccoli were donated by Barbara Bush in 1990.

External videos
- Presentation of broccoli to First Lady Barbara Bush by United Fresh Produce Association President George Dunlop, March 26, 1990, C-SPAN

Due to its central location near the seat of the United States government, the Capital Area Food Bank has been a popular stop for politicians. Four consecutive U.S. presidents – George H. W. Bush, Bill Clinton, George W. Bush, and Barack Obama – have visited the food bank.

In 1990, sitting president George H.W. Bush banned broccoli from Air Force One, stating, "I do not like broccoli. And I haven't liked it since I was a little kid and my mother made me eat it, and I'm President of the United States. And I'm not going to eat any more broccoli." In response to the ban, an estimated ten tons of broccoli were sent to the White House, which Barbara Bush in turn donated to the Capital Area Food Bank. That same year, the president visited the food bank and incorporated it into his Points of Light Foundation.

On Inauguration Day, 1993, more than thirty-five thousand cans, including one from Tipper Gore, were collected for the Capital Area Food Bank. In 1999, President Bill Clinton visited the food bank to volunteer and George W. Bush duplicated that act in 2002. Likewise, less than two weeks before Super Bowl XXXVIII in 2004, U.S. First Lady Laura Bush visited the Capital Area Food Bank to encourage Americans to participate in charitable activities. Other politicians have shown their support for the food bank by donating or otherwise promoting the cause of the Capital Area Food Bank. In 2005, for example, Maryland and Virginia Congressmen Chris Van Hollen, Steny Hoyer, Jim Moran, Frank Wolf, and Albert Wynn were successful in requesting US$1.3 million in federal funds for the food bank.

=== Client Leadership Councils at the Food Bank ===
The Capital Area Food Bank (CAFB) is notable for pioneering the use of Client Leadership Councils (CLCs) in their programming efforts. CLCs are steering committees composed of two-dozen food insecure people in the greater D.C. area that rely on CAFB and their network of partners for consistent access to healthy and nutritious foods. Over the course of 9 months, CLC members are put through a series of training programs designed to teach them how to tell their story, contribute to advocacy efforts, interface with the press, and influence CAFB and governmental policy and programming.

CLC members are selected through a thorough application and interview process. Any individual over the age of 18 who resides in the food bank's service area, faces food insecurity, and uses CAFB's services (or those of their distribution partners) is eligible to participate. CAFB works with their non-profit partner network to solicit applications from a wide variety of eligible candidates. Each applicant is then interviewed to ensure they meet the criteria, and that the group at large is widely representative of the larger clientele population.

CLC meetings begin in September and run through May, with members participating in 3-day-long training sessions on a monthly basis. During each session members participate in skill-building workshops, hear from experts working on food security issues, and ultimately make programmatic and policy recommendations to CAFB staff and local public officials. As the months progress, they then work collaboratively with CAFB staff members to implement approved changes. All CLC members are paid a living wage for time spent in program events, and their transportation to all events and meetings is heavily subsidized or fully covered.

Thus far the CLC program has had a significant effect on the ways in which CAFB and local lawmakers combat food insecurity in the region. They have influenced policies like the Virginia Dream Act and secured funding in the DC Mayoral budget through initiatives like Fair Shot DC. Additionally, they have expanded and helped refine the CAFB distribution network, facilitated the introduction of fresh produce to complement monthly food boxes, and have helped CAFB better understand nutritional needs as they vary by age and ethnicity within the clientele population.

== See also ==
- Feeding America – the nationwide food bank network that includes the Capital Area Food Bank
- List of food banks
