= Kathleen MacDonald High School =

Public high school in San Jose, California, United States

Location
- 3588 Zanker Road; San Jose, Santa Clara County, California 95134; United States
- Coordinates: 37°24′27″N 121°56′03″W

Information
- Type: Public high school
- Established: July 11, 2022 (3 years ago)
- School district: Santa Clara Unified School District
- NCES District ID: 0635430
- NCES School ID: 14618
- Principal: Vivian Rhone-Lay
- Teaching staff: 36.20 (FTE)
- Grades: 9-12
- Enrollment: 683 (2024–2025)
  - Grade 9: 259
  - Grade 10: 217
  - Grade 11: 204
  - Grade 12: 3
- Student to teacher ratio: 18.87
- Colors: Navy blue Green
- Athletics conference: Santa Clara Valley Athletic League
- Nickname: Condors
- Accreditation: Western Association of Schools and Colleges
- Yearbook: The Tamien
- Newsletter: Condor Courier
- Clubs: 18 (2022–2023)
- Sports teams: 17 (2024–2025)
- Website: macdonald.santaclarausd.org

Kathleen MacDonald High School is a comprehensive, coeducational public high school in San Jose, California, United States. It is one of five high schools in the Santa Clara Unified School District (SCUSD). MacDonald is accredited by the Western Association of Schools and Colleges through the 2025–2026 school year.

== History ==
In June 2014, the Santa Clara Unified School District purchased 59.4 acres of the former Agnews Developmental Center to build a K–12 educational facility. Construction began in 2016, with the elementary and middle schools finishing in 2021. Kathleen MacDonald High School was completed the following year and opened to freshmen in August 2022. It is named after Kathleen MacDonald, a longtime teacher and administrator at Adrian C. Wilcox High School.

== Academics ==
As of the 2024–2025 school year, MacDonald High School offers four Advanced Placement classes and six honors-level courses. The school emphasizes three educational qualities: a design thinking culture, learning communities, and inquiry-based learning. MacDonald also offers time for Personalized, Competency-Based Learning (PCBL) twice each week to support and encourage students.
