= Wilson High School (California) =

Location
- 1840 Benton Street; Santa Clara, Santa Clara County, California 95050; United States
- Coordinates: 37°20′47″N 121°57′24″W

Information
- Type: Alternative high school
- Motto: Small But Mighty
- Established: 1982 (43 years ago)
- School district: Santa Clara Unified School District
- NCES District ID: 0635430
- NCES School ID: 08984
- Principal: Pamela Galano
- Grades: 9–12
- Enrollment: 158 (2023–2024)
- Color(s): Blue; Yellow
- Nickname: Wolverines
- Accreditation: Western Association of Schools and Colleges
- Website: wilson.santaclarausd.org
- Last updated: 24 February 2024

Wilson High School is an alternative public high school in Santa Clara, California, United States. It is one of five high schools in the Santa Clara Unified School District (SCUSD) and is accredited by the Western Association of Schools and Colleges (WASC).

== History ==
Wilson was built in 1951 and opened in 1955 as an intermediate school. In 1982, it reopened as an alternative school with several renovations, including a new administration building. The school is named for William A. Wilson Sr., a local bakery owner and longtime Santa Clara High School board president.
