= Peterson Middle School =

Peterson Middle School may refer to:

Canada

- Harold Peterson Middle School - Oromocto, New Brunswick - Anglophone School District West

United States

- Hal Peterson Middle School - Kerrville, Texas - Kerrville Independent School District
- Marian A. Peterson Middle School - Sunnyvale, California (San Francisco area) - Santa Clara Unified School District
