= Campbell Union Grammar School =

Historic building in Campbell, California, US

- U.S. National Register of Historic Places
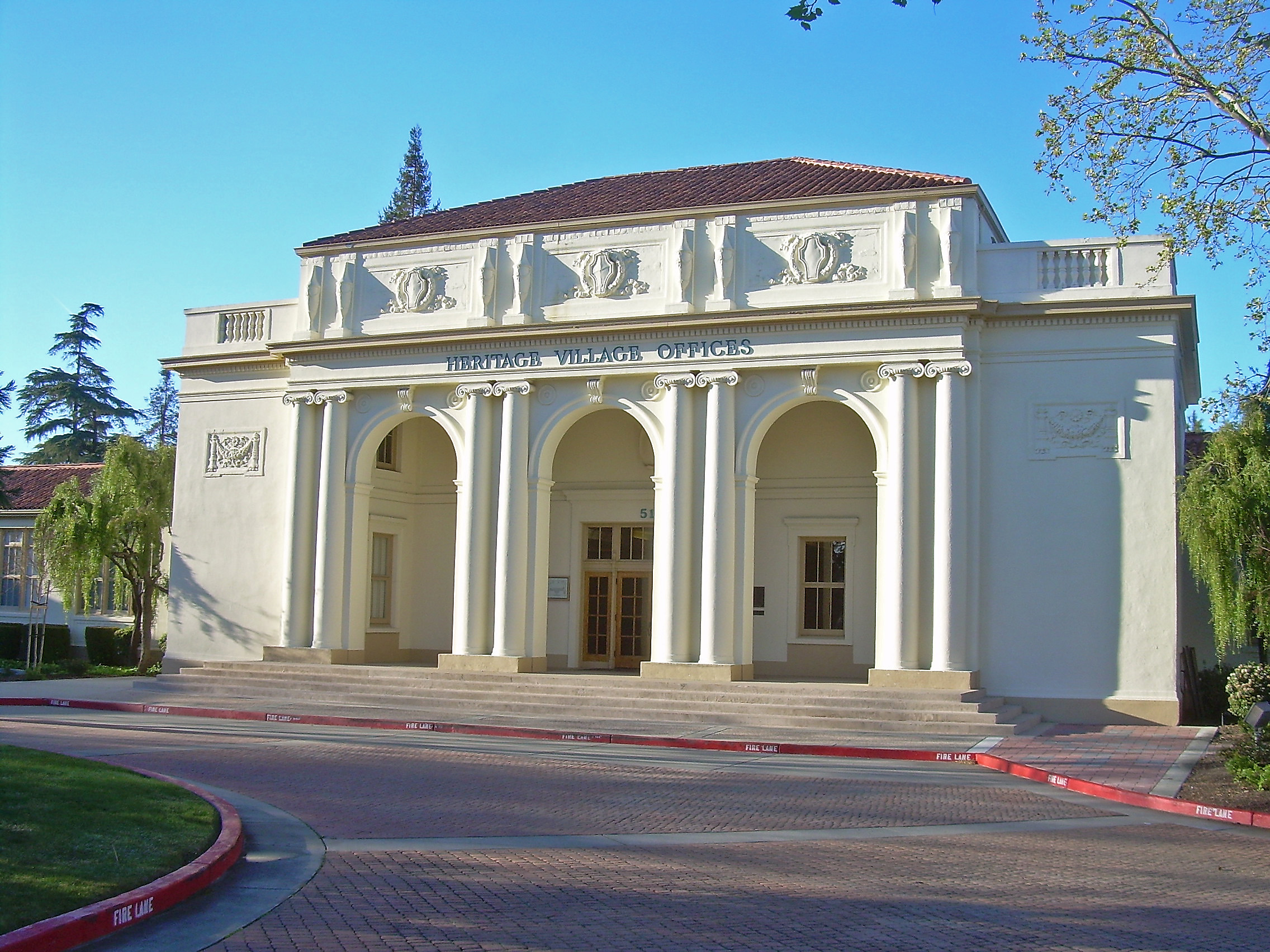
- Main entrance in 2008

- Location within San Jose, California
- Location: 11 East Campbell Avenue, Campbell, California, United States
- Coordinates: 37°17′16″N 121°56′56″W
- Area: 38,200 square feet (3,550 m^{2})
- Built: 1922–1929
- Builder/architect: William H. Weeks
- Architectural style: Mediterranean Revival
- NRHP reference No.: 79000544
- Added to NRHP: July 20, 1979

Campbell Union Grammar School (Note: Occasionally referred to as Campbell Grammar School) is a historic building in Campbell, California, United States. Designed by prominent Bay Area architect William H. Weeks, the building served as Campbell Union School District's first grammar school from 1922 to 1964. It is known for its Mediterranean Revival architectural style and was added to the National Register of Historic Places on July 20, 1979. It has been owned by private developers since 1979.

== History ==
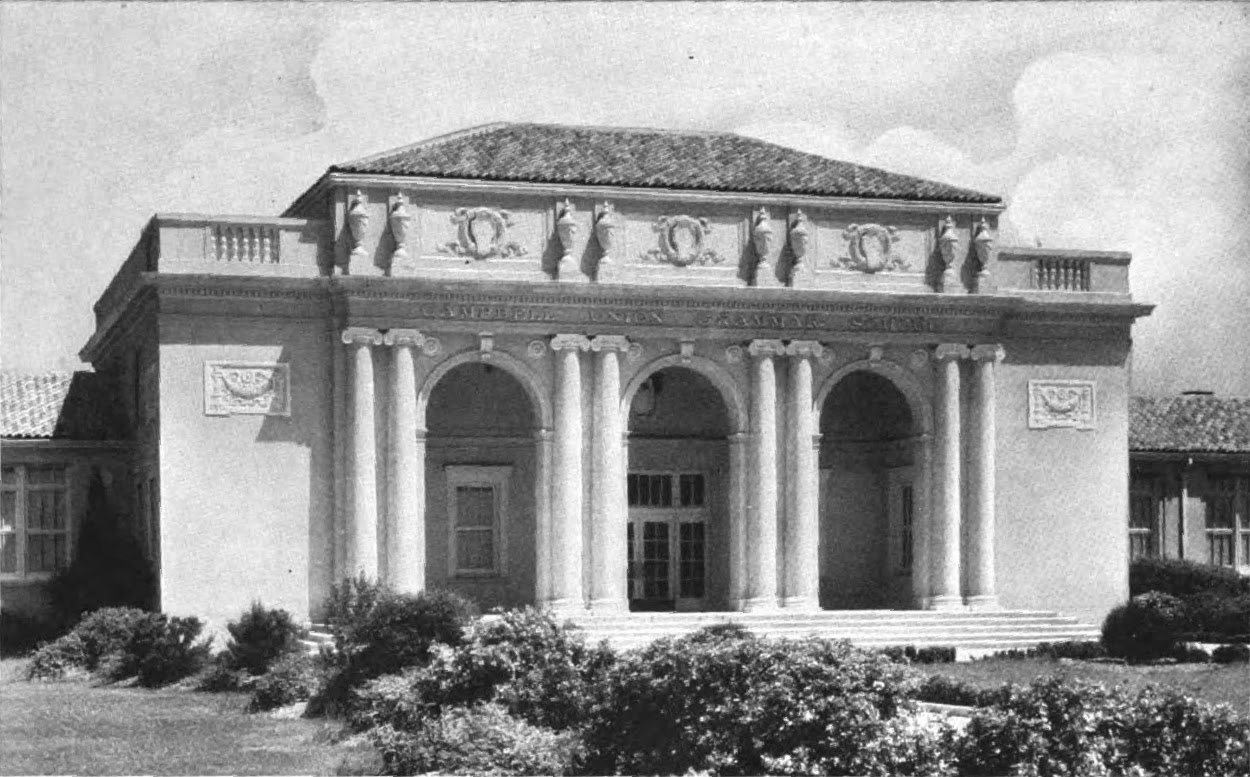
Campbell Union Grammar School's main entrance in 1928

After the formation of Campbell Union School District in 1921, voters approved a $155,000 bond issue to build the district's first grammar school. The school's cornerstone was laid on June 8, 1922, and initial construction was completed later that year under the supervision of architect William H. Weeks. Classes began on February 5, 1923, and the school was formally dedicated on April 6, 1923. The initial enrollment was 510 students. The school was the only grammar school in the district until 1946.

Although the school's ground plan was originally E-shaped, additions in June 1926 and March 1929 completed the enclosure of the courtyard. A sequoia gigantea was planted in February 1932 and reached a height of 60 feet (18 m) by the 1970s.

In 1964, the grammar school closed and students were relocated to individual neighborhood schools. The school building became a temporary location for West Valley Junior College in September 1964 and was used by the West Valley–Mission Community College District until 1976. A 1978 report found that the building was structurally safe, though it was vacant between 1976 and 1979. In 1979, the property was sold to private developers and was converted into office space, though much of the original exterior was kept.

=== Historical significance ===
Campbell Union Grammar School was added to the National Register of Historic Places on July 20, 1979.

== Design ==
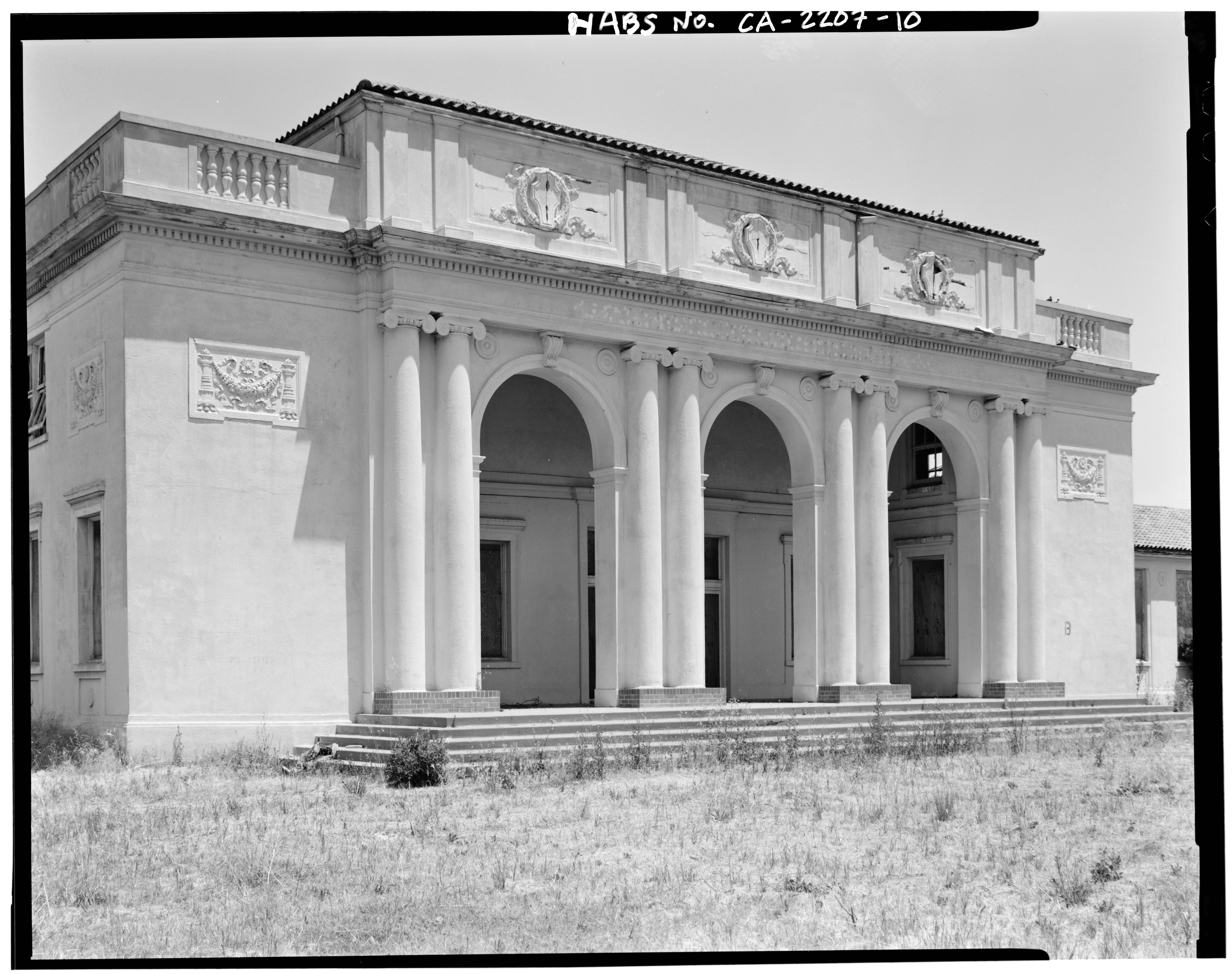
The main entrance in 1983

Considered by W. H. Weeks himself to be one of his best designs, Campbell Union Grammar School has a Mediterranean Revival architectural style and was designed to fit the needs of the surrounding region, then a rural agricultural area. The school was built with an oversized auditorium directly behind the main entrance to accommodate community meetings, and the front grounds originally acted as an open, park-like space, with the building set back from Campbell Avenue. The design was kept simple to economize the project.

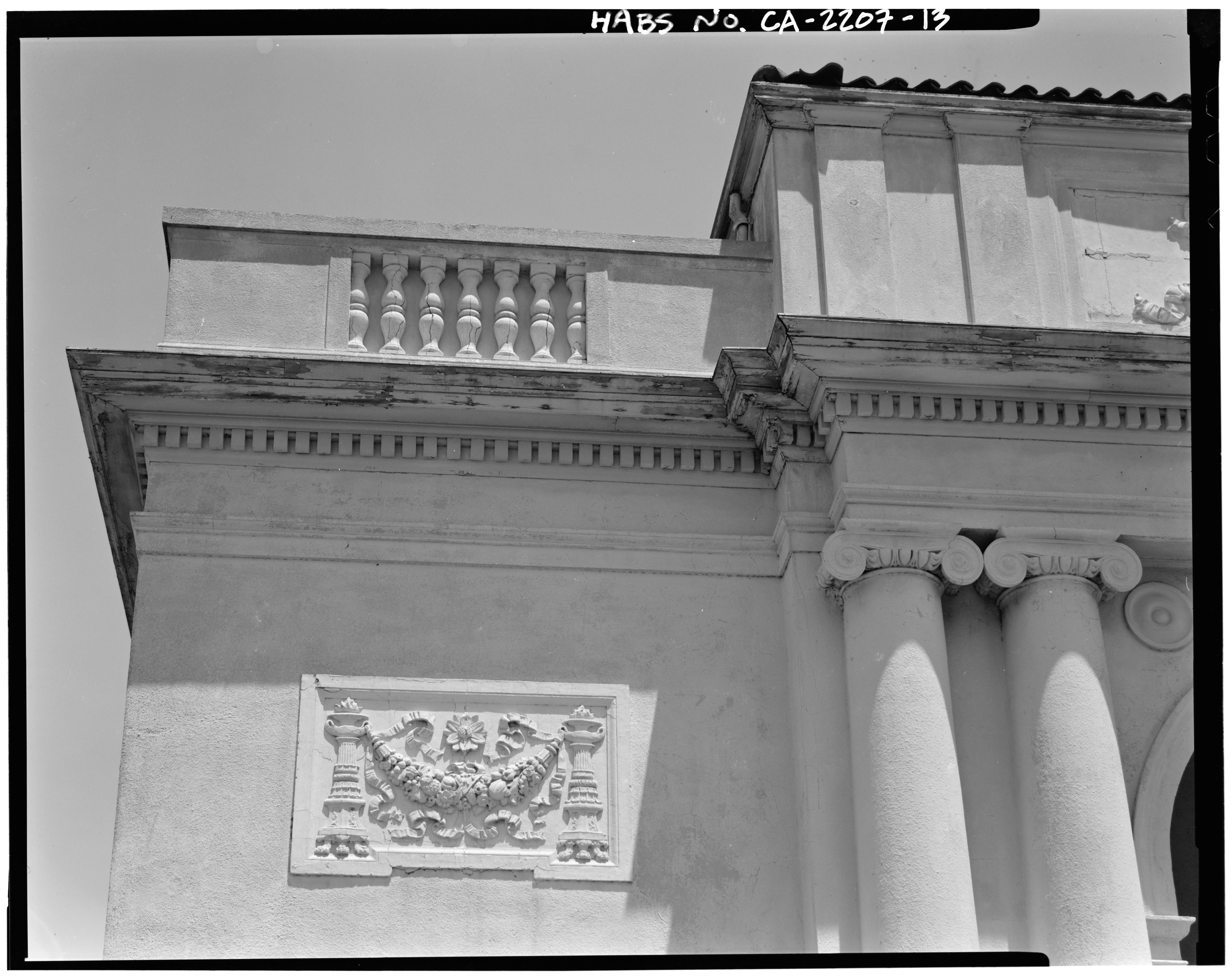
The cornice above the main entrance

Campbell Union Grammar School has four major entrances. The school's main entrance faces south and consists of three arches flanked by coupled columns with Ionic capitals. The architrave originally displayed the name of the school, which was removed in 1964. A large frieze contains decorative medallions divided into three panels that match the arches below. The north entrance consists of a simple arch and leads directly into the courtyard, while the east and west wings each have a rectangular entrance decorated with acanthus jambs and brackets.

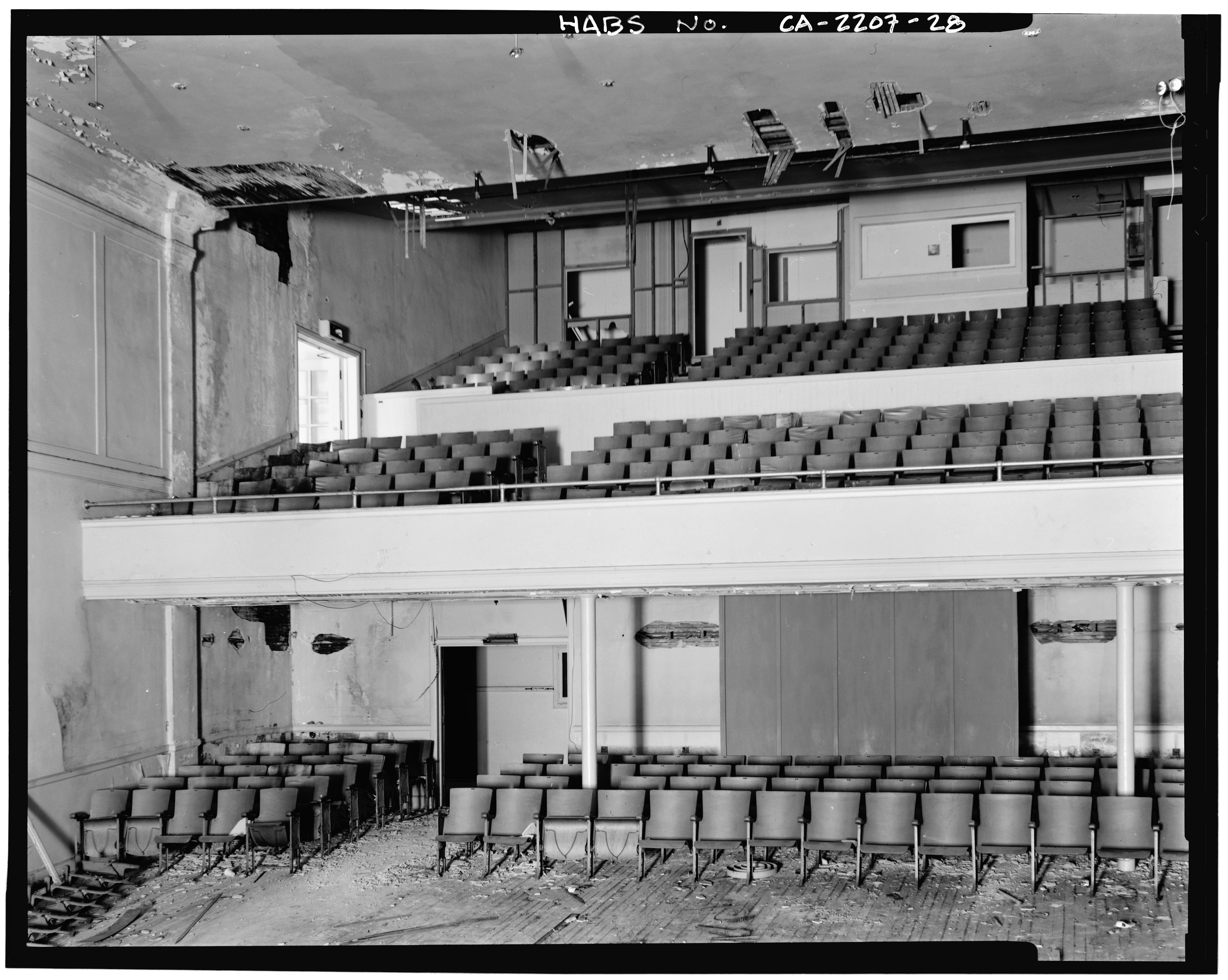
The auditorium, viewed from the stage

The two-story auditorium is centrally located and has a seating capacity of 1,200. It has raked seating, with adjacent dressing rooms and complete electrical and stage equipment. Because of its size and location, the auditorium extends into the courtyard.

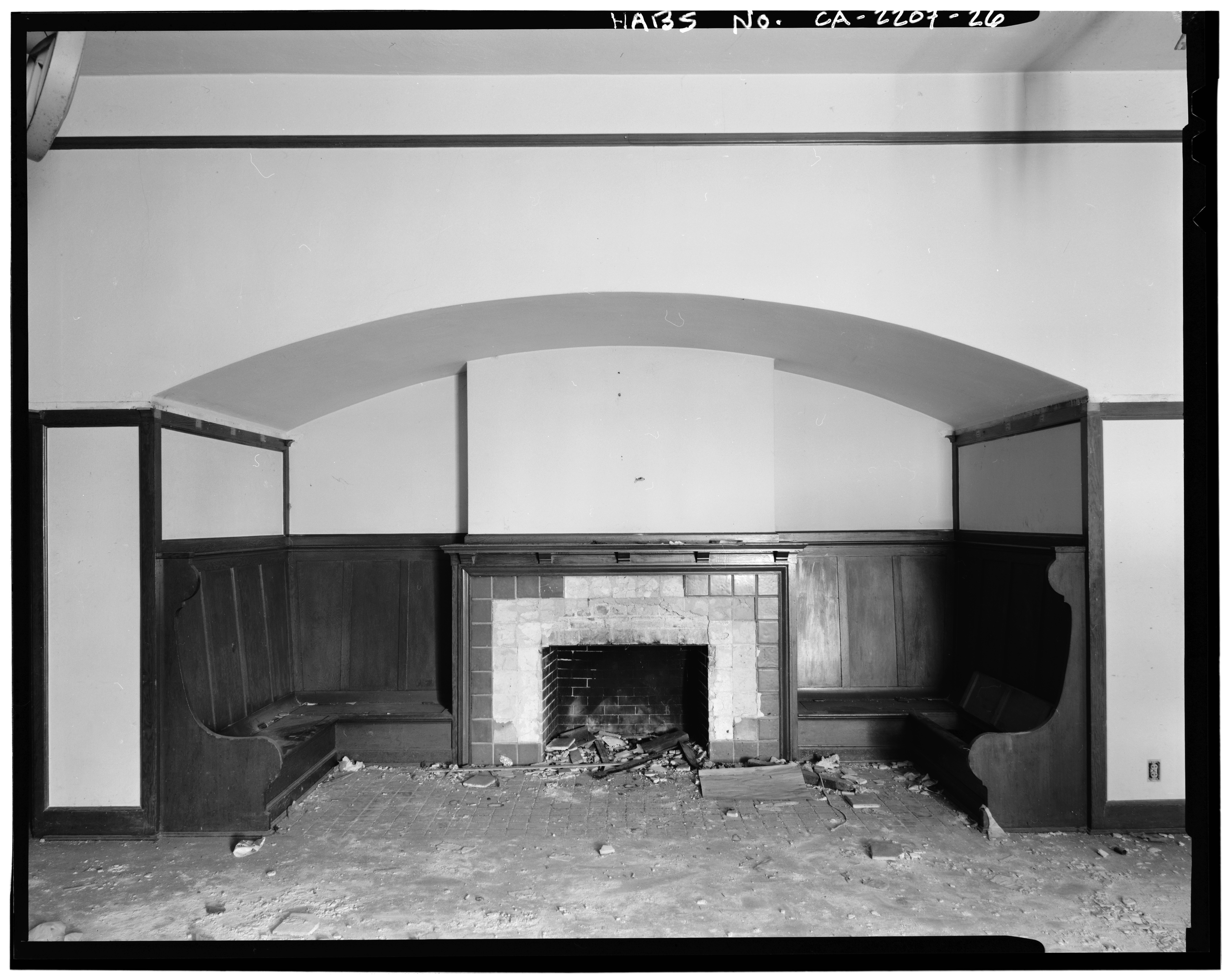
The fireplace and built-in seating in the kindergarten

The rest of the school is one story, with twenty classrooms located in wings around the courtyard. The school has several auxiliary rooms, including offices, a library, a first aid room, and a staffroom, as well as a cafeteria and rooms dedicated to home economics. The kindergarten has a fireplace faced with Batchelder tiles and originally had a sun porch. Low seats surround the hearth for children to warm their hands and feet.

The low-pitched, hipped and gable roof was originally completely covered in red terracotta tile. Tiling is still present on the exterior slopes of the roof, but portions of the slopes facing the courtyard now consist of asphalt shingles. The auditorium is covered by a flat, composition roof. There are two chimneys, one for the steam boiler and one for the kindergarten fireplace.

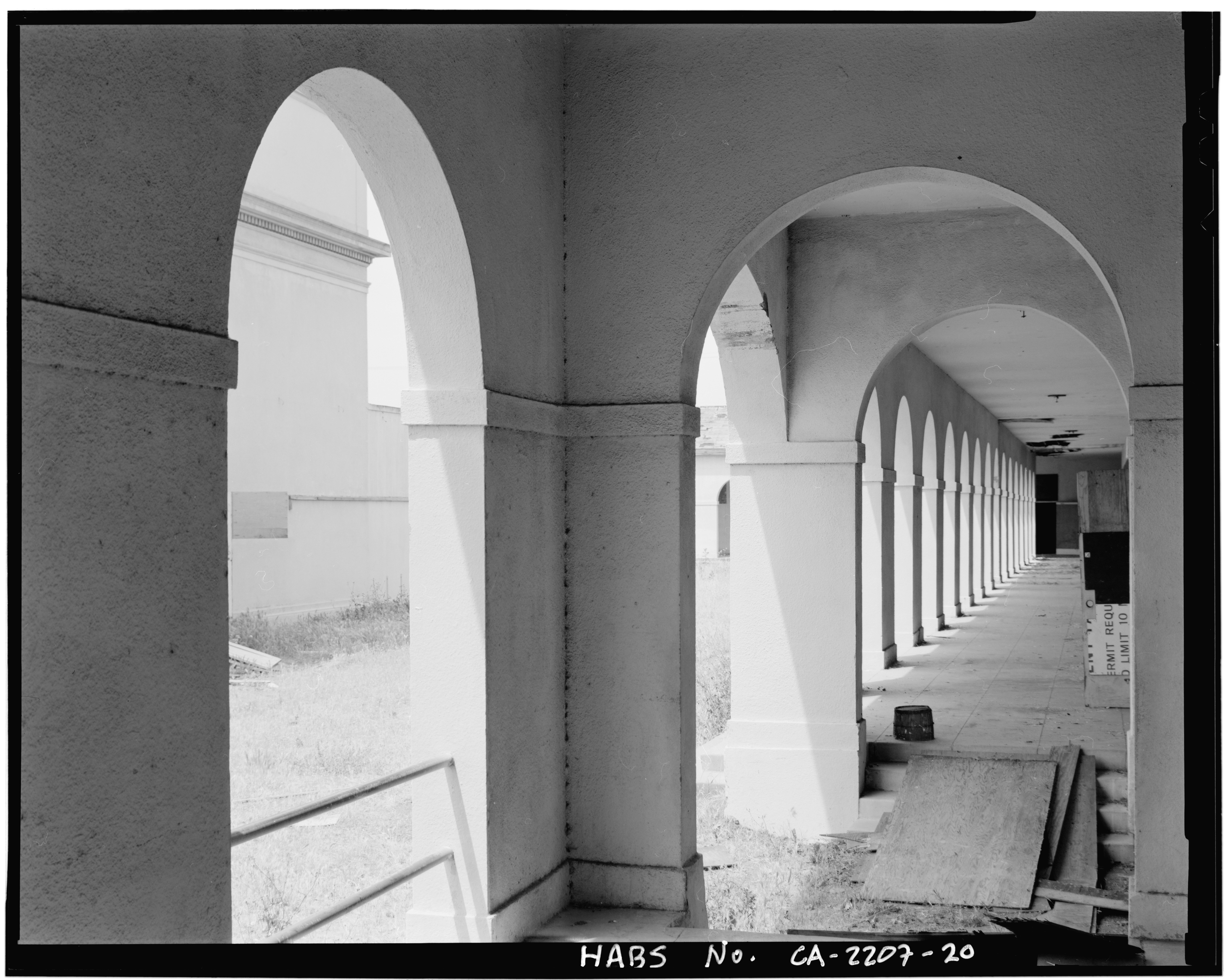
The arches of one of the arcades

Campbell Union Grammar School covers 38,200 square feet (3,550 m^{2}), with the structural system consisting of a wood frame and reinforced concrete. The building walls have wood frames with a concrete exterior and cement plaster finish, and the arcade walls are made of reinforced concrete.
