= SCUSD =

SCUSD may refer to:

- Sacramento City Unified School District
- Santa Clara Unified School District
