= Mission Early College High School (California) =

Location
- 3000 Mission College Boulevard; Santa Clara, California 95054; United States
- Coordinates: 37°23′33″N 121°59′01″W

Information
- Former name: Mission Middle College Program
- Type: Alternative public early college high school
- Established: August 16, 2017
- School district: Santa Clara Unified School District; West Valley–Mission Community College District
- NCES District ID: 0635430
- NCES School ID: 063543014067
- Principal: Viola Smith
- Teaching staff: 7.94 (FTE) (2023–2024)
- Grades: 9–12
- Enrollment: 189 (2023–2024)
- Student to teacher ratio: 23.80
- Accreditation: Western Association of Schools and Colleges
- Website: mechs.santaclarausd.org
- Last updated: 1 July 2024

Mission Early College High School (MECHS) is a public secondary education and college immersion program in Santa Clara, California, United States that serves students in grades nine through twelve. MECHS is a dual enrollment partnership between the Santa Clara Unified School District (SCUSD) and the West Valley–Mission Community College District (WVMCCD). It is accredited by the Western Association of Schools and Colleges (WASC). In 2024, MECHS was one of nine schools to receive the California Exemplary Dual Enrollment Award.
