= Adrian C. Wilcox High School =

Public high school in Santa Clara, California, United States

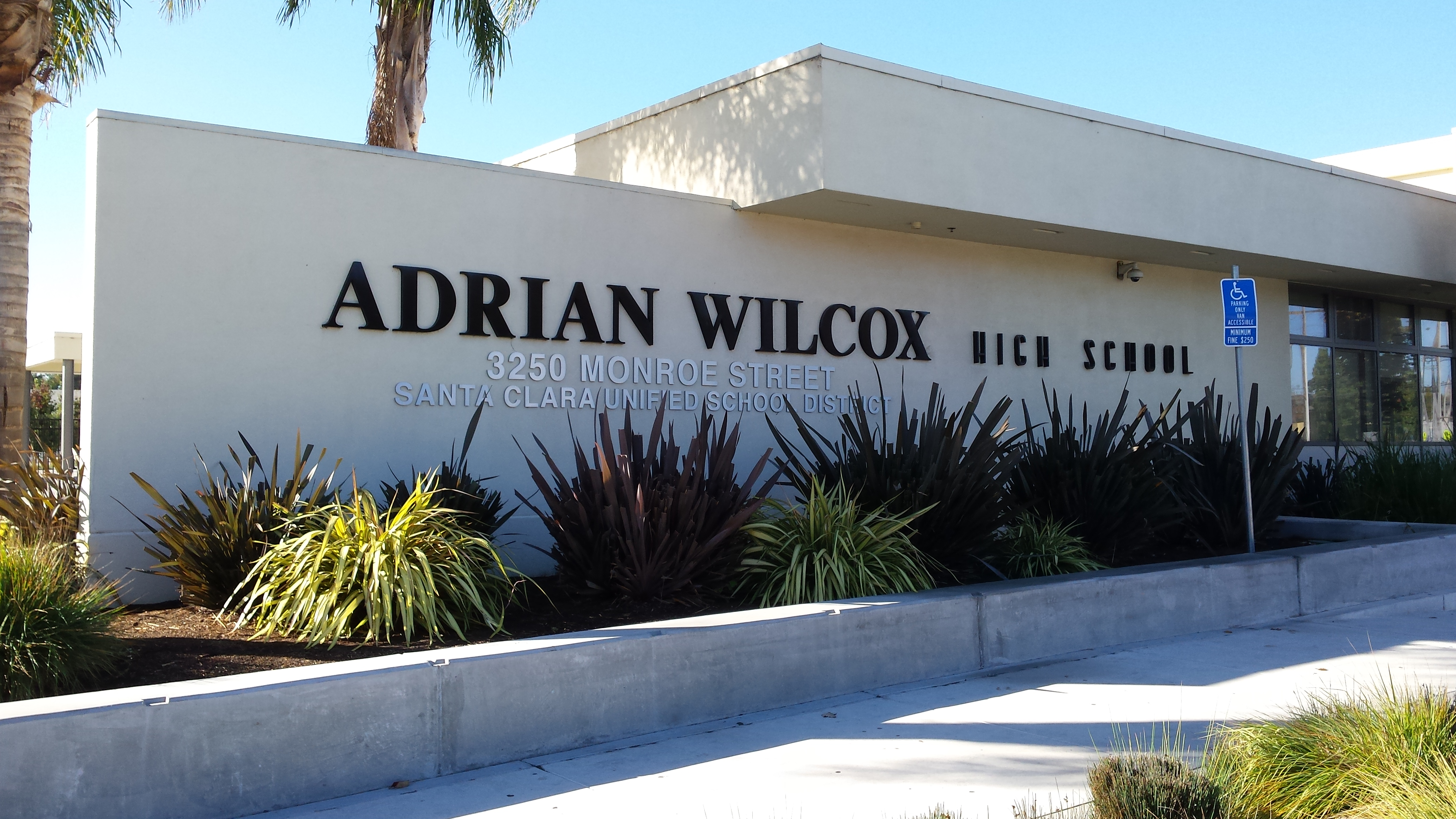

Location
- 3250 Monroe Street; Santa Clara, Santa Clara County, California 95051; United States; 37°21′59″N 121°59′10″W

Information
- Type: Public high school
- Motto: Be Charger Strong
- Established: September 1961
- School district: Santa Clara Unified School District
- NCES District ID: 0635430
- CEEB code: 053276
- NCES School ID: 063543006055
- Principal: Brandon Wall
- Staff and faculty: 168 (2024–2025)
- Teaching staff: 89.72 (FTE) (2023–2024)
- Grades: 9–12
- Enrollment: 1,695 (2023–2024)
  - Grade 9: 363
  - Grade 10: 401
  - Grade 11: 485
  - Grade 12: 446
- Student to teacher ratio: 18.89 (2023–2024)
- Schedule type: Modified block schedule
- Campus size: 33 acres
- Students' union: Associated Student Body
- Colors: Black; Gold
- Song: "Alma Mater"
- Fight song: "Fight On Wilcox" (Note: In 1981, the opening lyrics of Wilcox's fight song changed from "green and gold" to "black and gold".)
- Athletics conference: Santa Clara Valley Athletic League, CIF Central Coast Section
- Mascot: Charlie the Charger
- Nickname: Chargers
- Rival: Santa Clara High School
- Accreditation: Western Association of Schools and Colleges
- Newspaper: The Scribe
- Yearbook: The Phoenix
- Feeder schools: Peterson Middle School; Cabrillo Middle School
- Graduates (2024): 424
- Clubs: 85
- Sports teams: 21
- Website: wilcox.santaclarausd.org
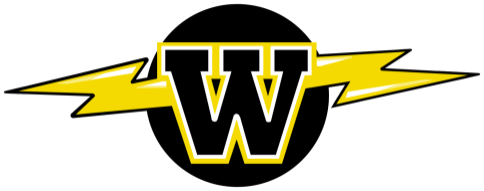

Adrian C. Wilcox High School is a comprehensive, coeducational public high school in Santa Clara, California, United States that serves students in grades nine through twelve. It is one of five high schools in the Santa Clara Unified School District (SCUSD). Wilcox was first accredited by the Western Association of Schools and Colleges in 1966 and has since been accredited through 2022. In April 2005, Wilcox officially became a California Distinguished School.

== History ==
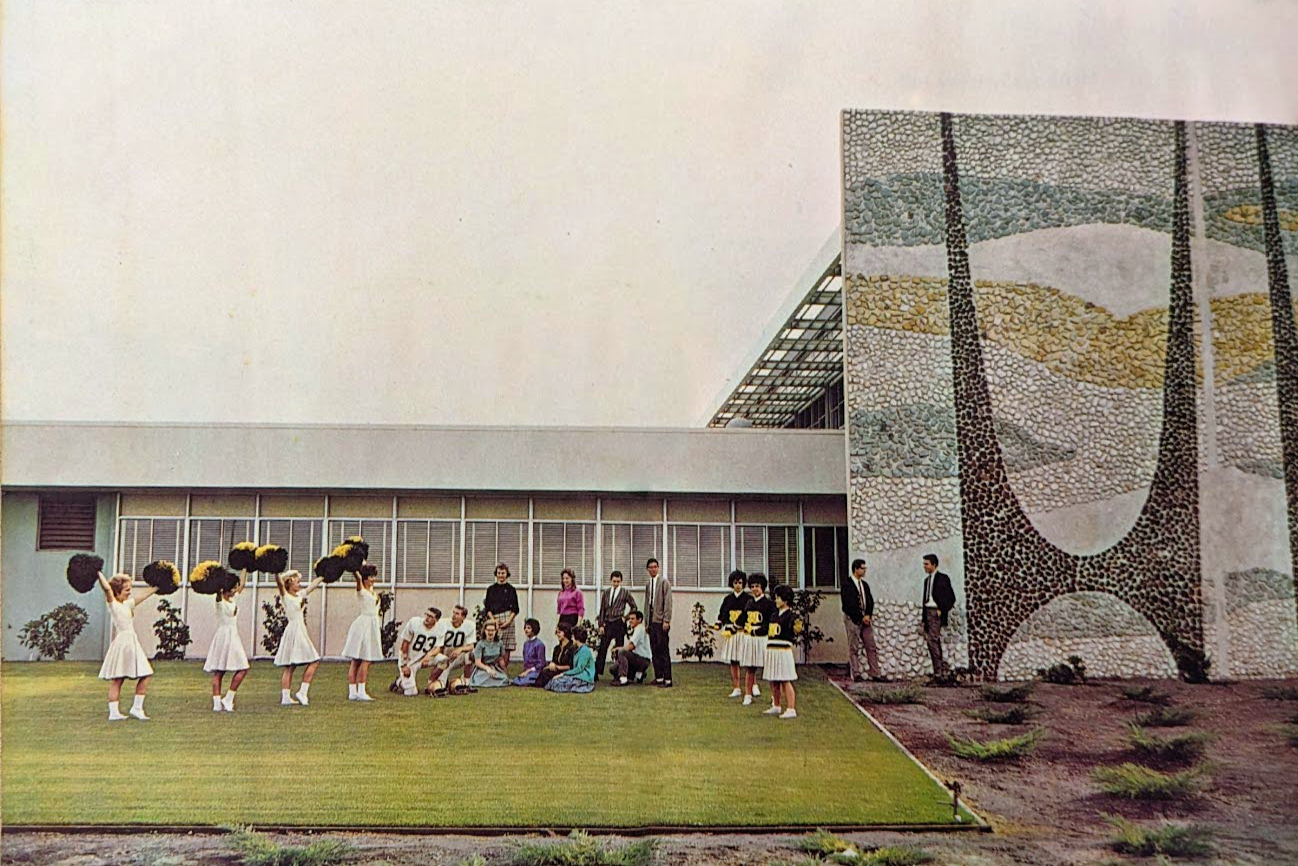
Students in front of the office and B Building, 1963

On May 19, 1960, the Santa Clara Union High School District began construction of a new high school, which was dedicated to thirty-year board member Adrian Clyde Wilcox on November 5, 1961. Construction was completed in 1962.

Wilcox High School opened to freshmen and sophomores in September 1961. Much of the student body, as well as most of the administrative staff, was pulled from Emil R. Buchser High School. (Note: Buchser High School merged with Santa Clara High School in 1981.) The first graduating class was the Class of 1964, and the first class to attend Wilcox for all four years was the Class of 1965. The first Wilcox homecoming was in 1963, although the homecoming parade was canceled that year due to the assassination of John F. Kennedy.

Six Wilcox alumni, as well as a former student who had transferred before graduating, were killed in the Vietnam War. Each body was recovered and returned home.

In 1981, the neighboring Peterson High School closed due to dwindling enrollment and was repurposed as Peterson Middle School. The former Peterson students joined the Wilcox student body. In an effort to be more welcoming to all students, the school voted to change its colors, mascot, and newspaper and yearbook names.

	1961–1981	1981–present
Colors	Green; Gold	Black; Gold
Mascot	The Warrior	Charlie the Charger
Newspaper	The War Chants	The Scribe
Yearbook	The Promethean	The Phoenix
Song	"Alma Mater"	
Fight song	"Fight On Wilcox"	

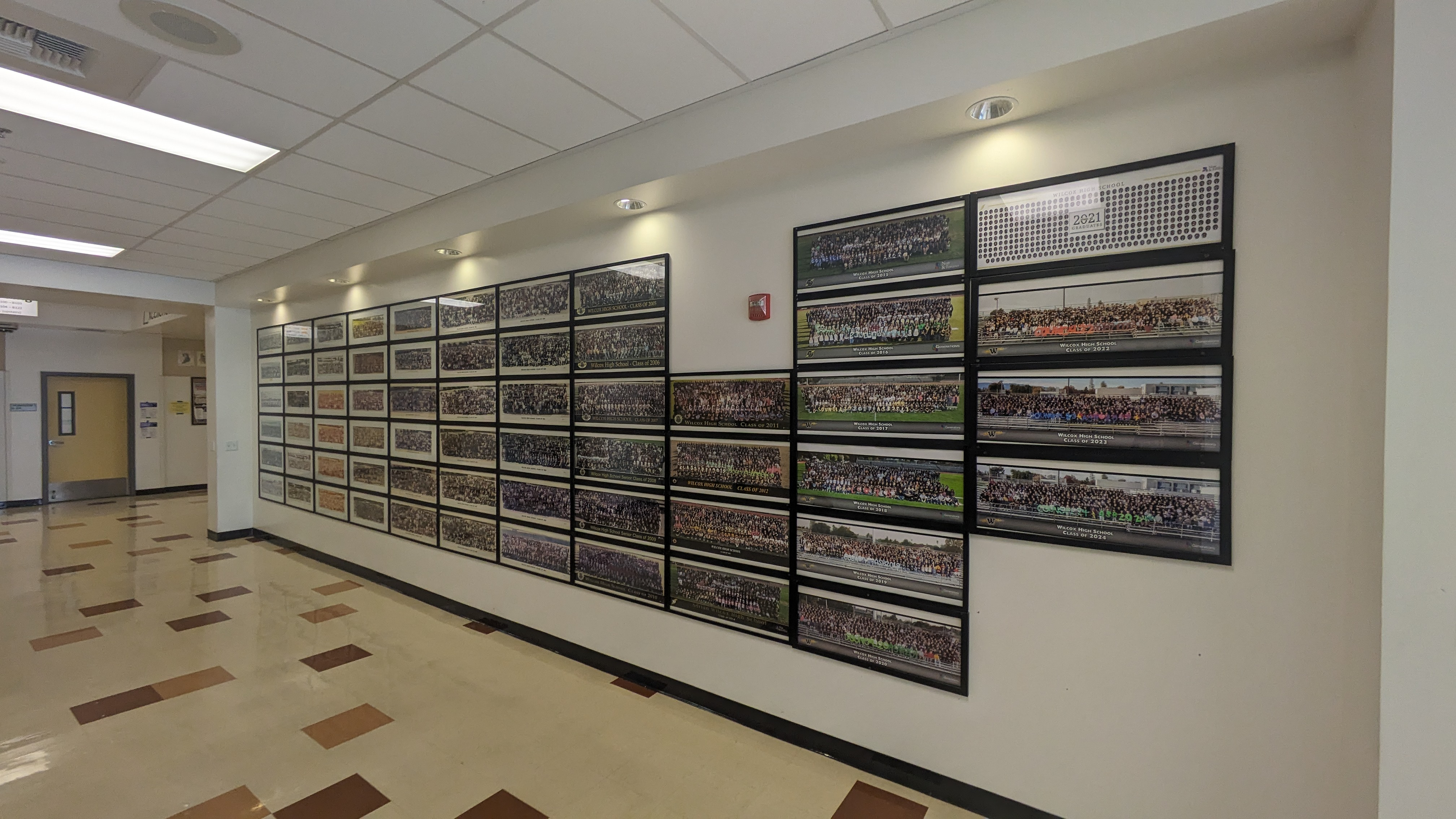
Graduating class photos on display in the B Building

In 2001, head custodian Joe Miller rediscovered several senior-year panoramic photos while cleaning out a filing cabinet. After successfully finding photographs for every graduating class, a senior panorama wall was dedicated in November 2003. It has since been updated and is on display in the B Building as of the 2024–2025 school year.

In February 2005, the Mission City Center for Performing Arts (MCCPA), a 360-seat theater with assorted backstage areas, opened on campus for use by both the Santa Clara Unified School District and the city of Santa Clara.

From 2010 until 2018, Wilcox competed against rival Santa Clara High School in the Black and Blue Olympics (BBO). Held annually in the spring, the BBO involved various friendly competitions and games between students. The tradition promoted unity between the schools before ultimately ending in 2018.

=== School traditions ===
==== Class colors ====
Each class is designated a class color. The colors for the 2026–2027 school year are:

Class of	Year	Color
2030	Freshman	Purple
2029	Sophomore	Yellow
2028	Junior	Green
2027	Senior	Blue

The colors are on a four-year rotation, with the senior class color being handed off to the freshman class the following year. For example, after the class of 2025's graduation, the incoming freshmen of the 2025–2026 school year, or the class of 2029, received their class color of yellow. The colors are primarily used during the weeks of Homecoming and Fantastics.

==== Fantastics ====
Fantastics is an annual spring semester school spirit week. During Fantastics week, all of the classes compete against each other in various contests and activities, such as competitive dance and banner painting. The competitors wear clothing that matches the color of their class. Alternating years are known as Sister Classes and often compete together during Fantastics.

== Campus ==
Wilcox High School's campus has an area of roughly 33 acres and spans across the Calabazas Creek. The majority of campus lies to the east of the creek, with only the N Building, M Building, and Mission City Center for Performing Arts situated to the west. Two bridges cross the creek.

The campus' quad has over a dozen tables with umbrellas, as well as a couple of grassy hills and a concrete platform. The quad serves as the center of activity throughout the school day and is sandwiched between the cafeteria, the library, and the B Building, R Building, and math portables.

The science wing and various playing fields are to the south of the math portables. The primary football field is situated on the eastern edge of campus and has a running track around it.

== Academics ==
=== AP and Honors classes ===
As of the 2024–2025 school year, Wilcox High School offers 24 Advanced Placement (AP) courses and 8 honors-level courses. Over 40% of students enroll in at least one AP or honors course, and an average of 69% of students passed their AP Exams during the 2022, 2023, and 2024 testing seasons.

=== CTE Program ===
Wilcox has a Career Technical Education (CTE) Program that covers subjects including business, fashion, and culinary skills. The program aims to fully prepare students for the careers and industries of the twenty-first century. Many CTE students receive college credit through Mission College.

== Extracurriculars ==
Wilcox's school newspaper is The Scribe, which maintains an online website and publishes several printed issues every school year. The school yearbook is known as The Phoenix.

=== Student unions ===
==== Associated Student Body ====
Wilcox's Associated Student Body (ASB) is composed of 17 students, including 13 officers and 4 class presidents. They are in charge of school dances, pep rallies, and other school-wide events like homecoming and Fantastics. At the beginning of the fourth quarter of every school year, students with a grade point average of 2.5 or higher are eligible to run for ASB.

==== Class councils ====
Each year has its own class council, consisting of nine members. The class president is also part of ASB. Much like ASB, students run for election to class councils. Class councils are in charge of class funding, fundraisers, activities, and execution of homecoming and Fantastics.

=== Performing arts ===
==== Music ====
The Wilcox High School Music Department has a string orchestra, chamber orchestra, concert band, and jazz band. The department puts on a few concerts every school year, including the Winter Concert and the Spring Concert, which are held in the Mission City Center for Performing Arts.

Wilcox's discontinued marching band, the "Black and Gold Regime", had a competitive after-school program and played at sports games and the annual homecoming parade.

==== Theatre ====
As of the 2023–2024 school year, Wilcox offers two theatre courses, Theatre 1 and Theatre Productions Honors. Theatre 1 provides an introduction to many theatrical techniques, including voice projection, pantomime, and improvisation. Theatre Productions Honors focuses on the theory and design of various aspects of technical theatre, including the sets, lights, and costumes. The class also covers and expands on the techniques learned in Theatre 1. Theatre Productions Honors is a UC-approved honors-level course.

The school's drama club is Wilcox Stage Company, which performs twice each school year at the Mission City Center for Performing Arts. Past performances include Grease (2018), Chicago (2019), and The Great Gatsby (2022).

=== Robotics ===
Wilcox High School has a Robotics Club consisting of two teams, each with hardware, software, and business departments. Team 8872 is the more advanced team and competes in the international FIRST Tech Challenge. Team 13190 was created in 2017 for freshmen and sophomores to gain experience before joining Team 8872.

=== Athletics ===
Wilcox High School has an extensive athletics program, with over twenty teams in sports ranging from football to lacrosse to badminton. Wilcox competes in the De Anza League of the Santa Clara Valley Athletic League (SCVAL).

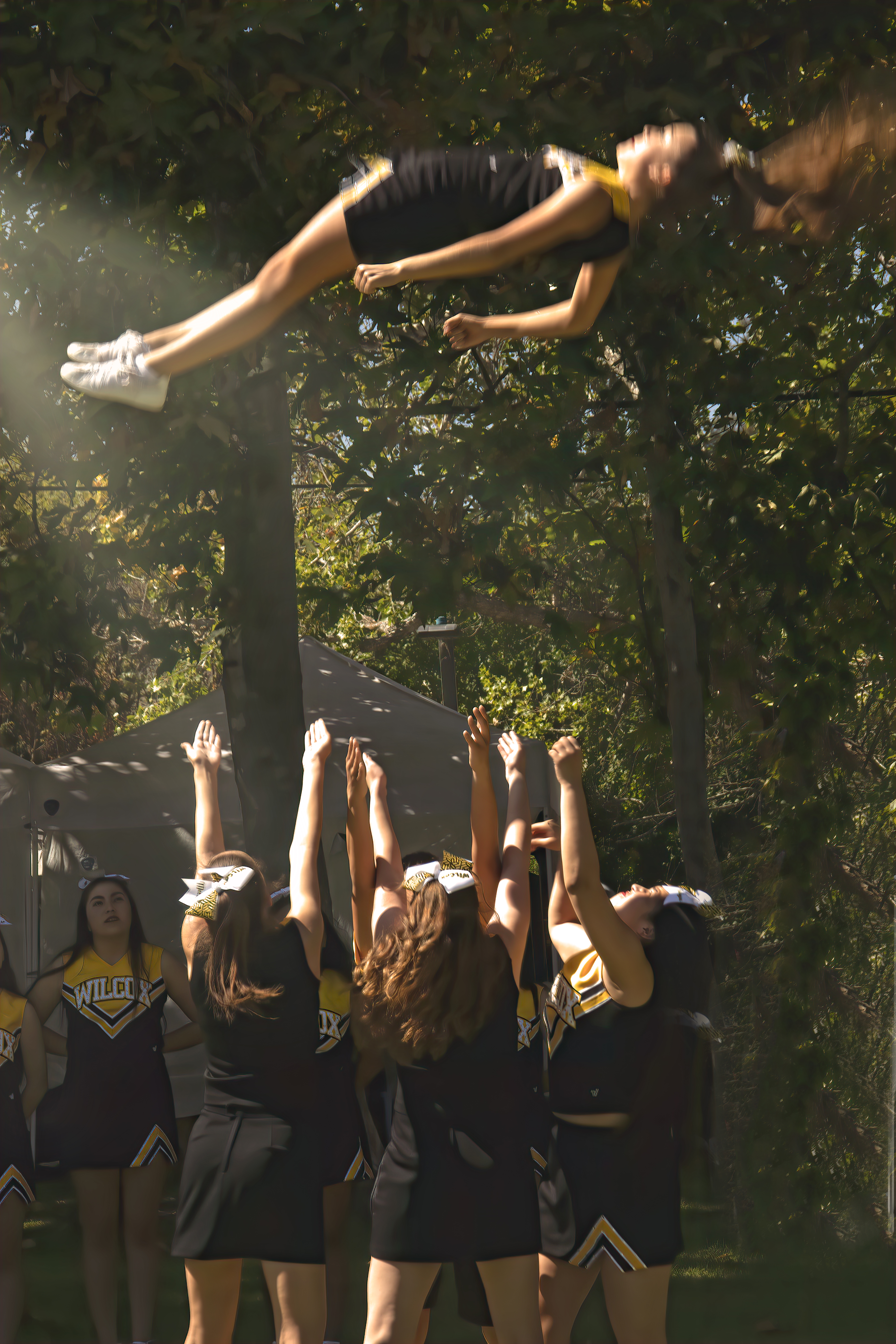
Wilcox cheerleaders practicing stunts

Sports offered at Wilcox High School (2023–2024)
	Fall Sports	Winter Sports	Spring Sports
Boys	Cross country, football, water polo	Basketball, soccer, wrestling	Badminton, baseball, competitive sports cheer, golf, swimming and diving, tennis, track and field, volleyball
Girls	Cross country, field hockey, flag football, golf, tennis, volleyball, water polo	Basketball, soccer, wrestling	Badminton, competitive sports cheer, gymnastics, lacrosse, softball, swimming and diving, track and field

==== Baseball ====
Wilcox's baseball program has won five CIF Central Coast Section titles (2000, 2002, 2004, 2008, 2014) since the turn of the century. The program has had numerous athletes compete at the collegiate and professional levels.

==== Track and Field ====
From 2009 to 2015, the Wilcox varsity track and field teams had a combined win-loss record of 84–4, with the boys' team going undefeated.

== Controversies ==
Slave Day
Prior to the 1989–90 school year, Wilcox held an annual "Slave Day" where students advertised and sold themselves to each other. In 1990, the Black Student Union convinced Wilcox administration to end the tradition.

Forgery incident and forfeited football games
In fall 2003, it was discovered that a senior member of the Wilcox football team had forged evidence of his academic eligibility in order to compete on the team. Following the discovery of the forgery, the Central Coast Section ruled that Wilcox was to forfeit six football games.

Head custodian replaced
During the 2009–10 school year, the Santa Clara Unified School District transferred the Wilcox head custodian, Joe Miller, to the district office following investigations revealing that he had violated sexual harassment policies.

Illicit relationship between teacher and student
In early 2010, former Wilcox teacher Edward Slate pleaded guilty to six felony counts relating to sexual relations with a student, which had lasted for roughly nine months beginning in 2008.

Environmental activists blocking homecoming parade
During the 2017 annual homecoming parade, roughly twenty AP Environmental Science students and other activists temporarily blocked parade floats in a protest against the wasting of resources at Wilcox.

Football players chanting homophobic slurs at male cheerleader
At a 2019 football game, some members of the Wilcox team began chanting homophobic slurs at a male cheerleader, culminating in physical threats against two cheerleaders. After investigations from the Santa Clara Unified School District and the Santa Clara Police Department, no criminal charges were filed and some students were disciplined individually.

== Notable alumni ==
- Carney Lansford, Class of 1975, former third baseman for the Oakland Athletics of Major League Baseball and namesake of Wilcox's baseball field
- Carlos Noriega, Class of 1977, former NASA astronaut and retired U.S. Marine Corps lieutenant colonel
- John Hendy, Class of 1981, former cornerback for the San Diego Chargers of the National Football League
- Bill Hare, Class of 1982, Grammy Award-winning audio engineer and contemporary a cappella producer
- Juju Chang, Class of 1983, Emmy Award-winning broadcast journalist and anchor of ABC News Nightline
- Amin Nikfar, Class of 1999, 2004 Asian Indoor shot put champion and former Olympic shot putter for Iran
- Kyle Barraclough, Class of 2008, free agent relief pitcher who has played for several Major League Baseball teams
- Bump Cooper Jr., Class of 2019, cornerback for the Miami Dolphins of the National Football League
