= New Valley =

New Valley may refer to:

- New Valley LLC, an investment company based in Miami, Florida
- New Valley Continuation High School, a high school in California
- New Valley Governorate, Egypt
- the New Valley Project, a major irrigation project in Egypt

== See also ==
- New Hall Valley
- New Hope Valley
- New Klang Valley
- New River Valley
- New-Wes-Valley
