= New Valley Continuation High School =

New Valley High School

Location
- 1875 Lawrence Road; Santa Clara, California 95051; United States
- Coordinates: 37°21′26″N 121°59′43″W

Information
- School type: Public
- Founded: 1968
- School district: Santa Clara Unified School District (SCUSD)
- Principal: Laurie Stapleton
- Faculty: 17
- Grades: 10–12
- Enrollment: 169 (2022–23)
- Campus type: Suburb
- Colors: Black and Green
- Mascot: Knight
- Information: (408) 423-2300
- Website: nvhs.ca.campusgrid.net

New Valley High School is a small SCUSD alternative school outside of the Santa Clara Unified School District office near Lawrence Expressway in Santa Clara. The school was previously located Wilson Alternative Education School, until it was relocated in 2001 due to overcrowding. The majority of the students enrolled at New Valley are either behind in earning the 230 required graduation credits, or have been expelled from either Wilcox High School or Santa Clara High School.

== History ==
New Valley High School was established in 1968 near the Lawrence District office building in small "portable" building due to the small student body.
