= Bita Daryabari =

Iranian-born American philanthropist, entrepreneur, computer scientist

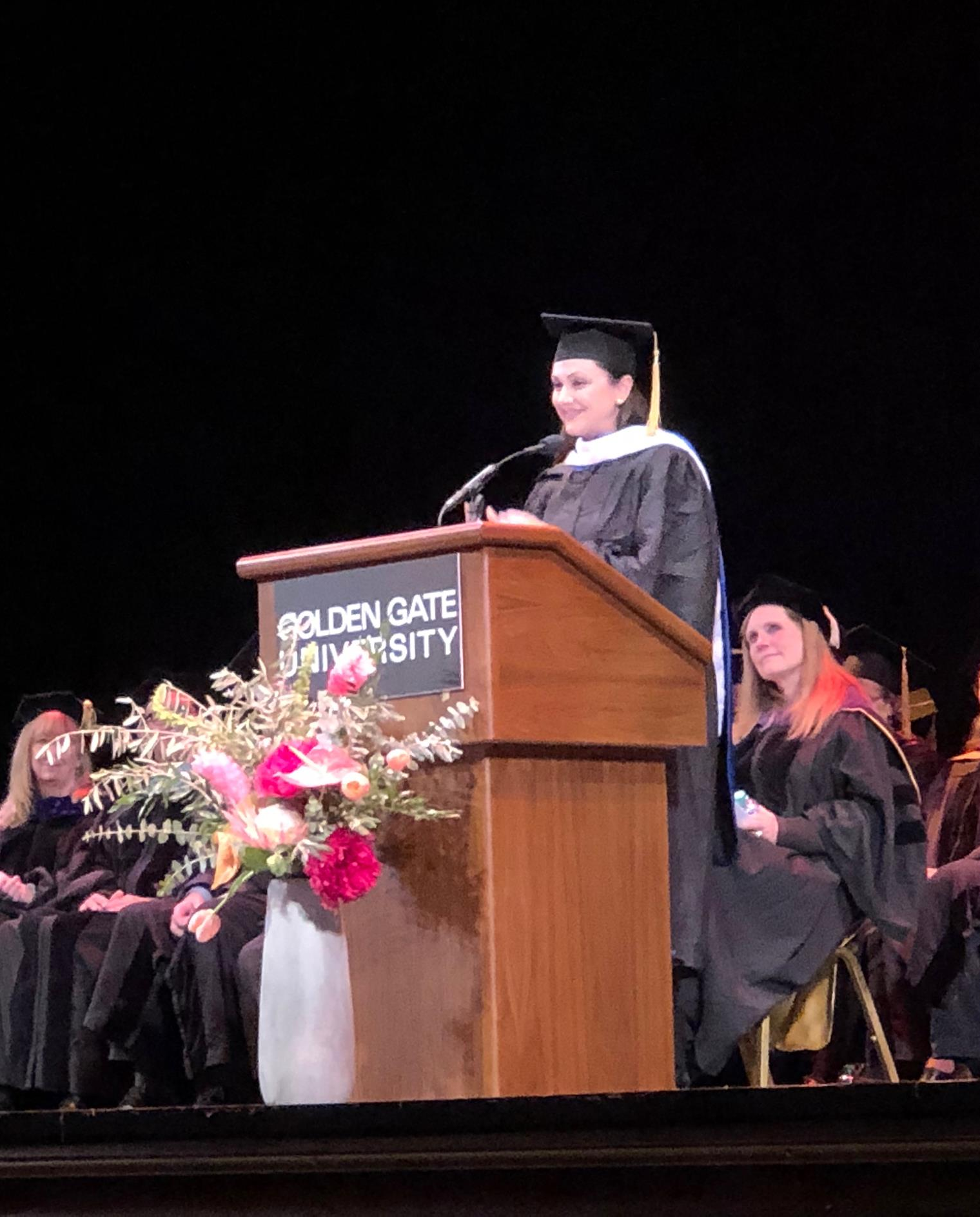
- Bita Daryabari in 2016
- Born: April 6, 1969 (age 57); Tehran, Pahlavi Iran (now Iran)
- Citizenship: United States
- Education: California State University, East Bay (BSc); Golden Gate University (MSc)
- Known for: Founding Unique Zan Foundation, Pars Equality Center
- Spouses: Omid Kordestani (m. 1991; div. 2009) Reza Malek (m. 2009; div. 2016) Shahkar Bineshpajooh (m. 2018)
- Website: Parsequalitycenter.org

Bita Daryabari (Persian: بیتا دریاباری; born April 6, 1969, in Tehran) is an Iranian-American philanthropist, entrepreneur and computer scientist. She is the founder of several community organizations which focus on Persian immigrants in society and arts in the United States. Daryabari has provided financial assistance to various educational institutions for research on the Iranian studies in higher education, including endowments to Stanford, Pembroke College, U.C. Davis, and U.C. Berkeley. She has a named Chair at U.C. Davis in Persian Language and Literature and at U.C. Berkeley in Iranian Studies.

== Early life and education ==
Bita Daryabari was born in Tehran, Pahlavi Iran (now Iran). Her father was a dentist and her mother was a housewife. She grew up reading Persian books, including those of the scholar Rumi. Daryabari moved to the US from a war-stricken Iran in 1985 where she attended high school in St. Joseph, Missouri. In Missouri, she was received by her uncle.

Daryabari attended California State University, East Bay where she received a BSc in computer science. She also attended Golden Gate University in San Francisco where she received a MSc in telecommunications management.

== Career and philanthropy ==
Bita Daryabari began her career in engineering at GammaLink. She moved on to a career in telecommunications at MCI Communications where she worked until 1996.

Daryabari began focusing her career on philanthropy where in 2008 she founded the Bita Daryabari Endowment for Persian Literature and Poetry with a contribution of $2.5 million. The same year, she created a $6.5 million Bita Daryabari Endowment in Persian Letters at Stanford. In 2011, she founded a community organization in California called the Pars Equality Center where she and the members of the organization assist Iranian immigrants living in the United States. In 2015 she opened a branch in San Jose, called the Daryabadi Iranian Community Center to extend the services to the Farsi speaking community.

Additional endowments have included $2 million for the Shahnama Project at Pembroke College in 2013, a $1.5 million gift to the University of California, Davis in 2015 to broaden its Persian studies program, and $5 million to UC Berkeley in 2016 for the study of Iranian languages, literature, arts, and culture.

Daryabari is the founder of the Unique Zan Foundation, a social service organization that works with academic institutions and organizations for women in the Middle East. In 2016, UC Berkeley announced the Presidential Chair in Iranian Studies after her name.

== Awards and recognition ==
Daryabari has received numerous awards and recognition for her work including Golden Gate University's Alumni of the Year in 2008. In 2010 she was named Philanthropist of the Year by Public Affairs Alliance of Iranian Americans (PAAIA), and in 2011 received the United Nations Appreciation Award. Additional honors include being the recipient of the Ellis Island Medal of Honor in 2012 and being named a World Affairs Council Honoree of the Year in 2015. In 2018 she received an honorary doctorate from Golden Gate University. In 2022 she was an honoree by the Carnegie Corporation of New York's Great Immigrant Award.

== Personal life ==
Daryabari married Google executive Omid Kordestani in 1994 and they had two children together, a daughter, Misha Kordestani, and a son, Milan Kordestani. Daryabari and Kordestani separated in 2007, and Daryabari married Reza Malek, a surgeon and medical entrepreneur, in 2009. They divorced in 2016. Daryabari married Iranian poet and singer Shahkar Bineshpajooh in 2018.
