= Buchser High School =

Defunct high school in Santa Clara, California, United States

Emil R. Buchser High School

Location
- 3000 Benton Street; Santa Clara, California 95051; United States
- Coordinates: 37°20′45″N 121°58′56″W

Information
- Type: Public high school
- Established: October 9, 1957 (68 years ago)
- Status: Defunct
- Closed: 1981 (45 years ago)
- School district: Santa Clara Union High School District (1957–1966); Santa Clara Unified School District (1966–1981)
- Grades: 9–12
- Colors: Red; Black; White
- Team name: Bruins
- Rival: Santa Clara High School
- Newspaper: Bear Prints
- Yearbook: Kodiak

Emil R. Buchser High School was a comprehensive, coeducational public high school in Santa Clara, California, United States that served students in grades nine through twelve. It opened in 1957 as the Santa Clara Union High School District's second high school, and it closed in 1981 due to declining enrollment. The campus was repurposed as Santa Clara High School's new location, and Buchser Junior High School (Note: Now Buchser Middle School) was established at Santa Clara High's old location.

== History ==
Construction of Buchser High School began in 1957 and wrapped up in 1958. The school opened to freshmen and sophomores on October 9, 1957 and held half-day sessions for the first three weeks due to ongoing construction. It grew to include grades nine through twelve by the 1959–1960 school year. The school was dedicated to longtime superintendent Emil R. Buchser Sr. on October 11, 1959.

The Santa Clara Unified School District suffered declining enrollment throughout the late 1970s. On November 6, 1980, the district board of education announced that the student bodies of Buchser High School and Santa Clara High School would merge before the 1981–1982 school year. Following the merge, Santa Clara High moved to Buchser High's location. Buchser Junior High School (Note: Buchser Junior High School became Buchser Middle School in 1986.) was established at Santa Clara's old location.

=== Principals ===
- Elmer Johnson (1957–1959)
- Herbert L. Stocking (1959–1961)
- Donald Callejon (1961–1973)
- Jack Lyon (1973–1980)
- George Bergna (1980–1981)

== Notable alumni ==
- Steve Bartkowski, Class of 1971, former quarterback for the Atlanta Falcons (1975–1985), Washington Redskins (1985), and Los Angeles Rams (1986) of the National Football League
- Joe Charboneau, Class of 1974, former left fielder for the Cleveland Indians (1980–1982) of Major League Baseball
- Mark Langston, Class of 1978, former pitcher for the Seattle Mariners (1984–1989), Montreal Expos (1989), California/Anaheim Angels (1990–1997), San Diego Padres (1998), and Cleveland Indians (1999) of Major League Baseball
- Omid Kordestani, Class of 1980, businessman and former executive chairman of Twitter
- George "Krazy George" Henderson, teacher (1975), professional cheerleader who created the wave
