= West Valley–Mission Community College District =

Community college district in California, United States

Address
- 14000 Fruitvale Avenue Saratoga, California, 95070; United States
- Coordinates: 37°15′56″N 122°00′40″W

District information
- Type: Public
- Established: January 1963 (63 years ago)
- Chancellor: Bradley J. Davis
- Asst. superintendent(s): Ngoc Chim; Shawna Dark; Terrance DeGray; Eric Ramones; Chris Rolen
- School board: 7 members
- Governing agency: California Community Colleges
- Accreditation: Accrediting Commission for Community and Junior Colleges
- Schools: West Valley College, Mission College
- Enrollment: 18,819 (2023–2024)

Other information
- Website: www.wvm.edu

The West Valley–Mission Community College District (WVMCCD) is a public community college district that serves roughly 20,000 students from Santa Clara County and Santa Cruz County in California, United States. The district administers two colleges, West Valley College and Mission College, and is headquartered on the campus of West Valley College. It was established in 1963 as the West Valley Joint Community College District and received its current name in 1985.

== History ==
In 1962, the California State Board of Education approved a countywide plan for community college districts, which involved the creation of the West Valley Joint Community College District to serve the areas covered by the Campbell Union, Los Gatos–Saratoga Joint Union, and Santa Clara Union High School Districts. The district was officially established after a January 1963 referendum, and West Valley Junior College classes were first held on September 14, 1964, at Campbell Grammar School.

In 1966, the district purchased 143 acres of land in Saratoga to build a permanent campus for West Valley Junior College and district offices. After obtaining funding from the Junior College Construction Act, construction began on June 15, 1967, and completed in 1974. Classes moved to the site in 1968 after the first building was completed.

The West Valley Joint Community College District also purchased 12 acres of land in Santa Clara in 1966 to build another campus, and the land parcel was expanded to 164 acres in 1970. While the campus was being built, Mission College opened in 1975 at Jefferson Intermediate School. The first phase of construction of the permanent campus completed in 1979, and the college moved there for the 1979–1980 academic year.

The district changed its name to the West Valley–Mission Community College District in September 1985.
