= West Valley College =

Community college in Saratoga, California, US

Coordinates: 37.263429°N 122.010000°W

- Type: Public community college
- Established: 1963
- Parent institution: West Valley-Mission Community College District
- Chancellor: Bradley Davis
- President: Jennifer Taylor-Mendoza
- Faculty: 198 full-time and 270 associate
- Students: 8,056
- Location: Saratoga, California, United States
- Campus: 143 acres (58 ha)
- Colors: White, Navy Blue, Orange
- Mascot: Viking
- Website: www.westvalley.edu

West Valley College is a public community college in Saratoga, California. It is part of the California Community College system.

== History ==
The college was founded as West Valley Junior College in 1963. It was to serve the footprint of the Campbell Union High School District, the Los Gatos-Saratoga Joint Union High School District, and the Santa Clara Unified School District. The district was formed by voter approval in January 1963. The first classes began September 14, 1964. The first campus took over the space of the defunct Campbell Union Grammar School, at 1 East Campbell Avenue near Winchester Boulevard in Campbell across the street from Campbell High School. The grammar school itself was closed because its WPA era buildings were deemed unsafe in the event of an earthquake. While some of the existing buildings used, most of the classrooms were portable, parked on the former playgrounds.

The land for the new campus, where the school is located now was purchased in 1966. Groundbreaking for the new construction was June 15, 1967. Starting in 1968 the first new building was occupied and a few classes transitioned to the new campus, many in temporary classrooms while further permanent structures were built. The transition was completed in 1975.

== Campus ==
The campus occupies 143 acres (58 ha) near the West Valley Freeway in Saratoga.

== Organization and administration ==
West Valley College is part of Silicon Valley's West Valley–Mission Community College District, which also administers Mission College in nearby Santa Clara, in turn part of the California Community Colleges System. The district serves the cities of Saratoga, Campbell, Los Gatos, Monte Sereno, Santa Clara, and San Jose. The district headquarters is on the West Valley College campus.

== Academics ==
As of 2005, West Valley College offered 61 associate degree programs and 94 certificate programs. As of 2017, the school had a total enrollment of 9,463 students and its faculty had 404 full-time and 168 associate members. From those 9,463 students, 5,721 are returning students from the semester before.

== Athletics ==
The West Valley Vikings represent the school in sport and athletics. Team colors are navy blue, orange and white. Teams include baseball, men's basketball, men's and women's soccer, men's and women's swimming, men's and women's water polo, softball, women's volleyball, women's tennis and beach volleyball.

=== Men's soccer ===
Winning Percentage of (.715) over the last 10 seasons only losing 48 games while winning 151. 12 Coast Conference Championships since 1998, last being in 2015 where they Four-Peated as champions from 2012 to 2015. Nationally ranked 8 seasons since 1998. last being in 2015.

=== Men's baseball ===
One of six teams to have won more than 130 games in a span of four seasons. 7 Conference Championships, last being in 2009. Nine Super Regionals, last being in 2008. Reached the Final Four in 2008 and was ranked #7 in the nation that same season.

=== Men's water polo ===
West Valley's community college program and in all of California with a multitude of trophies including: Six State Championships, Twenty Northern California Championships, and Twenty-Eight Conference Championships.

=== Women's softball ===
Since 2010, the West Valley softball team has reached the playoffs four times and won two Conference Championships, the last in 2015. The Vikings were CCCAA State Champions in 1990 and 2002. The team received a top eight selection in 2013.

== Notable people ==
- Mark Bingham and Nicole Carol Miller, United Airlines Flight 93 casualties
- Stan Bunger, news anchor
- Doug Capilla, baseball player
- Joe Charboneau, baseball player
- Vicky Galindo, baseball player
- John Hendy, football player
- Kit Lathrop, football
- Cung Le, mixed martial artist
- Adam Peters, football scout and executive
- H. Paul Shuch, SETI scientist
- Jason Tarver, football coach
