= Omid Kordestani =

Iranian-American businessman (born 1963)

- امید کردستانی
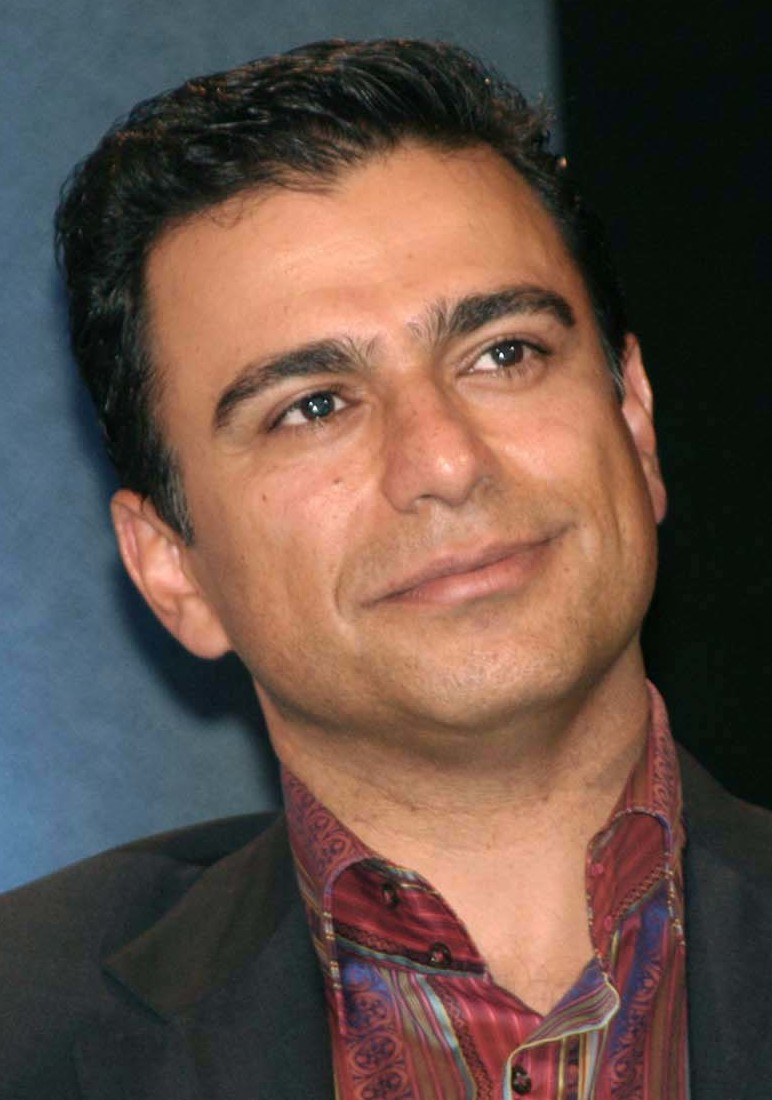
- Kordestani at the Web 2.0 Conference, 2005
- Born: 1963 (age 62–63); Tehran, Imperial State of Iran
- Citizenship: United States
- Education: San Jose State University (BS); Stanford University (MBA)

Omid R. Kordestani (Persian: امید کردستانی; born 1963) is an Iranian-American businessman who was the executive chairman at Twitter from October 2015 to June 2020 and a board member of the company until October 2022. He was a senior vice president, the chief business officer, and most recently a special advisor to the chief executive officer and founders at Google from July 2014 to October 2015 and was a director of Vodafone from March 2013 to October 2014. Kordestani had also previously been at Google from May 1999 to April 2009, reaching the position of Senior Vice President for Worldwide Sales and Field Operations.

== Early life and education ==
Omid Kordestani was born in Tehran, Iran. He has some Kurdish ancestry. He attended Andisheh Don Bosco School, an Italian Catholic school in Tehran that emphasized education and language skills. He moved to San Jose, California after the death of his father in 1976. In 1980, Kordestani graduated from Buchser High School in Santa Clara, California.

He later received an electrical engineering degree from San Jose State University and went to work for Hewlett-Packard as an engineer. Several years later in order to pursue a business degree, he entered Stanford Graduate School of Business and earned his MBA in 1991.

== Career ==
Kordestani has more than a dozen years of high-technology consumer and enterprise experience, including key positions at Internet pioneer Netscape Communications. He was also vice president of Business Development and Sales and grew Netscape's website revenue from an annual run-rate of $88 million to more than $200 million in 18 months. He started his career at Netscape as director of OEM Sales, and during his four-year career at that company, he was responsible for establishing major customer relationships with Citibank, AOL, Amazon, Intuit, Travelocity, Intel, @Home, eBay, and Excite. Prior to Netscape, Kordestani held positions in marketing, product management, and business development at The 3DO Company, Go Corporation, and Hewlett-Packard. He joined Google in May 1999, leading the development and implementation of the company's initial business model and was Google's senior vice president of worldwide sales and field operations until April 16, 2009. Kordestani played a part in Google's worldwide revenue generation efforts as well as the day-to-day operations of the company's sales organization.

On July 18, 2014, Kordestani came back to Google to fill the vacancy of Chief Business Officer at Google after Nikesh Arora, who was recruited to Google by Kordestani himself, left for SoftBank. Initially interim, his post became permanent in October.

On October 14, 2015, Kordestani left Google and became Executive Chairman at Twitter. After a power struggle between Twitter chief executive officer Jack Dorsey and Elliott Management, Kordestani was replaced by Patrick Pichette in June 2020. He remained a member of the board until its dissolution in October 2022.

In December 2021, Kordestani was appointed as chairman of the Board at Pearson plc. His position became effective in March 2022. On August 10, 2024, he filed a lawsuit against Elon Musk and X Corp over unpaid stock options after the Twitter board had been dissolved by its new owner.

== Philanthropy ==
Kordestani was one of the founders of PARSA Community Foundation (2006–2011), an Iranian cultural, heritage, entrepreneurship, and philanthropic society based in Redwood City, California.

== Personal life ==
Kordestani net worth was estimated to be $2.2 billion in 2012, after his divorce from Bita Daryabari. Kordestani has two children with Daryabari, and three with Gisel Kordestani, whom he married in 2011.

In the May 8, 2006, issue of Time Magazine, Kordestani was named one of Time's "100 People who shape our world".

Kordestani was selected as the Persian Person of the Year in 2007 by Persian Awards.

== See also ==
- List of Iranian Americans
- Pierre Omidyar
- Parisa Tabriz
