= Marian A. Peterson Middle School =

- The front entrance and main office of Peterson Middle School.

Location
- Sunnyvale, California; United States; 37.3492°N 122.0086°W

Information
- Type: Public middle school
- Motto: Ready, Responsible, Respectful, Safe.
- Established: 1965
- School district: Santa Clara Unified School District
- Principal: Rick Hayashi
- Grades: 6-8
- Student to teacher ratio: 22:1
- Campus size: 47 acres (19.02 hectares)
- Colors: Black; Gold
- Team name: Pirates

Marian A. Peterson Middle School (formerly Marian A. Peterson High School, (Note: Now Marian A. Peterson Middle School)) is a public middle school located in Sunnyvale, California.

== History ==
Marian A. Peterson Middle School started as a comprehensive, coeducational public high school that operated from 1965 to 1981. The school served students in grades nine through twelve in the Santa Clara Unified School District (SCUSD). Due to declining student enrollment, the school was repurposed as Marian A. Peterson Middle School in 1981 and its student body was absorbed by Adrian C. Wilcox High School.

On 28 October 2011, Kamala Harris visited the school to meet with students to discuss cyberbullying and online safety.

As of 2026, the middle school has 741 students. 45.9% are Asian/Pacific Islander, and 27.3% are Hispanic/Latino.

== Notable alumni ==
- Brian Boitano, Class of 1981, figure skater, Olympic gold medalist and two-time world champion
- Bill Pecota, Class of 1977 or 1978, Major League Baseball player, Kansas City Royals, New York Mets and Atlanta Braves 1986 to 1994
- Chuck Wright, Class of 1979, professional wrestler known as The Godfather
- Tom Bruce, Class of 1970, swimmer in 1972 Olympics, won two medals
- Amy Tan, attended for one year, author of The Joy Luck Club
- Tony Anselmo, Class of 1978, voice of Donald Duck and an artist for Disney
- Ben Bennett, Class of 1980, quarterback for Duke University, played in NFL, USFL, AFL and WLAF
- Juju Chang, Class of 1983, host on ABC television's Good Morning America
- Bill Hare, Grammy-Award Winning recording engineer and producer
