= Campbell Union School District =

School district in California

Address
- 155 North Third Street Campbell, California, 95008; United States
- Coordinates: 37°17′19″N 121°56′50″W

District information
- Type: Public
- Grades: K–8
- NCES District ID: 0607200

Students and staff
- Students: 6,622 (2020–2021)
- Teachers: 294.7 (FTE)
- Staff: 401.69 (FTE)
- Student–teacher ratio: 22.47:1

Other information
- Website: www.campbellusd.org

The Campbell Union School District is an American school district for Primary schools in the greater San Jose, California area. It was established in 1921. As of 2010, it served the communities of Campbell, Los Gatos, Monte Sereno, San Jose, and Santa Clara. The district includes 13 schools (nine elementary schools, two middle schools, one TK-8 school, and one day school) for an enrollment of 7300 students.

== Schools ==
The district includes the following schools:

School name	City	Students	FTE Teachers	Pupil/Teacher Ratio
Blackford Elementary School	San Jose	582	29	20.1
Campbell School of Innovation	Campbell			
Capri Elementary School	Campbell	417	20.8	20
Castlemont Elementary School	Campbell	713	36.2	19.7
Forest Hill Elementary School	San Jose	573	30.6	18.7
Lynhaven Elementary School	San Jose	486	23.6	20.6
Marshall Lane Elementary School	Saratoga	528	28.2	18.7
Monroe Middle School	San Jose	860	45.7	20.3
Rolling Hills Middle School	Los Gatos	1045	49.1	21.3
Rosemary Elementary School	Campbell	440	23	19.1
Sherman Oaks Elementary School	San Jose	457	22.8	20
Village School	Campbell	224		20
Notes	Sherman Oaks Elementary, Monroe Middle School, and Rolling Hills Middle School are Charter schools. Hazelwood School was closed in 2004. Campbell Middle School was closed in 2018 and transformed into the TK-8 Campbell School of Innovation (initially TK-4 and growing to TK-8 over the next few years).			
