= Santa Clara Unified School District =

School district in California

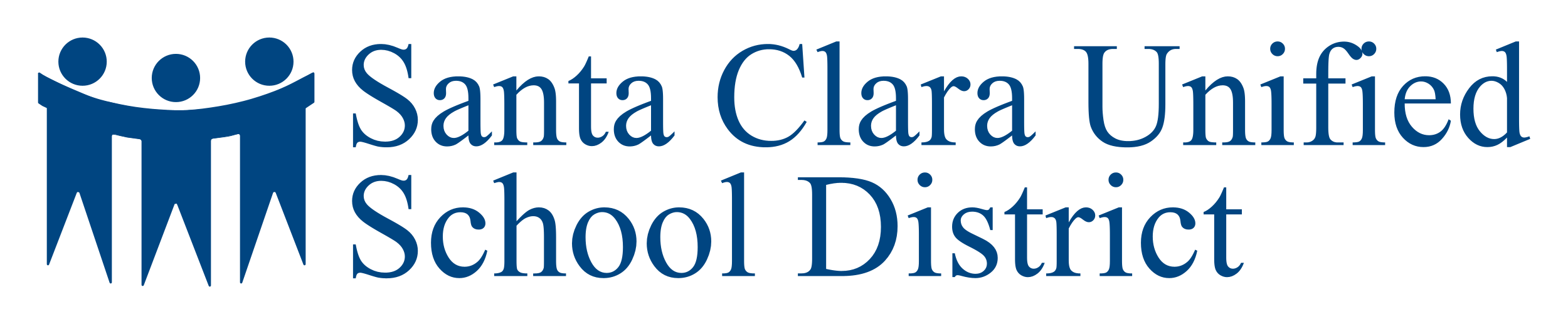

Address
- 1889 Lawrence Road Santa Clara, California, 95051; United States
- Coordinates: 37°21′26″N 121°59′43″W

District information
- Type: Public; unified
- Grades: Early learning; K–12; adult education
- Established: July 1, 1966 (60 years ago)
- Superintendent: Damon J. Wright
- Schools: 32
- Budget: $531.9 million (2023–2024)
- NCES District ID: 0635430

Students and staff
- Students: 14,448 (2024–2025)
- Teachers: 730.92 (FTE) (2023–2024)
- Staff: 1,690.93 (FTE) (2023–2024)
- Student–teacher ratio: 19.48 (2023–2024)

Other information
- Website: santaclarausd.org

The Santa Clara Unified School District (SCUSD) is a public school district in Santa Clara County, California, United States, that serves roughly 14,000 students from the cities of Santa Clara, Sunnyvale, San Jose, and Cupertino. The district operates eighteen elementary schools, four middle schools, one K–8 school, five high schools, one community day school, one adult education program, and one dual enrollment partnership with the West Valley–Mission Community College District at Mission College38% of SCUSD students are Hispanic or Latino and 31% are Asian.

== History ==
=== Before unification ===
The Santa Clara Unified School District was preceded by three elementary school districts and one union high school district.

==== Alviso School District ====
The Alviso School District was established in 1855 and administered several primary schools in the North San Jose and Rancho Milpitas areas. The district primarily served the children of local farmers and had a significant Japanese population. In 1965, the Alviso School District served 757 students.

The Alviso Grammar School was established in 1855 as the oldest school in the area, and it was where Bank of America founder Amadeo Giannini attended elementary school. After the school burned down in 1899, it was rebuilt as the Alviso School with funding and land from local rancher George Mayne. The Alviso School District also included Midway School and several Japanese-only schools.

==== Jefferson Union School District ====
The Jefferson Union School District was established in 1926 to administer several primary schools in rural unincorporated areas in Santa Clara and Sunnyvale. Jefferson's first superintendent was George Max Wilhelmy, who was succeeded by Lawrence C. Curtis in 1932. In 1965, the district served 11,511 students.

The Jefferson Union School District initially included the schools of Jefferson, Millikin, Braly, and Agnew. The original Jefferson School was established along the San Tomas Aquino Creek in 1861, six years after the original Millikin School was established on Lawrence Station Road. In 1927, a new Jefferson School with more amenities was built at the intersection of Lawrence and Monroe.

==== Santa Clara Elementary School District ====
The Santa Clara Elementary School District (Note: Occasionally referred to as the Santa Clara City School District or the Santa Clara School District) was established by 1925 and administered several primary schools in downtown Santa Clara, east of the San Tomas Aquino Creek. Its oldest school, the Santa Clara Grammar School, was established in 1867. In 1965, the district served 3,366 students.

By 1960, the Santa Clara Elementary School District included Fremont School, (Note: Previously the Santa Clara Grammar School (1867–1913)) C. W. Haman School, Scott Lane School, Washington School, Westwood School, and William A. Wilson Intermediate School.

==== Santa Clara Union High School District ====
The Santa Clara Union High School District was a union school district established before the 1921–1922 academic year to administer several secondary schools in the areas covered by the Alviso, Jefferson, and Santa Clara Elementary districts. In 1959, it served roughly 2,800 students.

Santa Clara High School was established in 1872 on the same property as the Santa Clara Grammar School, eventually moving to its own location in 1906. By 1966, the district included Santa Clara High School, Emil R. Buchser High School, Adrian C. Wilcox High School, and Marian A. Peterson High School.

=== Unification and recent history ===
Due to rapid population increases and industrialization, the four school districts began making efforts to merge in the 1950s. Following new financial incentives offered by the state government in 1964, Santa Clara voters approved school district unification in September 1965. The Santa Clara Unified School District was officially established on July 1, 1966, to serve neighborhoods in Santa Clara, Sunnyvale, San Jose, and Cupertino. SCUSD's first superintendent was Lawrence C. Curtis, who had previously served as the superintendent of Jefferson Union School District.

In the 1970s and 1980s, demographic shifts resulted in smaller, older families in the area, causing a 50% decrease in enrollment and the closure of 15 schools before the 1981–1982 academic year. Buchser High School closed, and its campus was repurposed as Santa Clara High School's new location. Buchser Middle School was established at the former Santa Clara High School campus. Additionally, Peterson High School was converted into Peterson Middle School, with the high school students joining the Wilcox High School student body.

In June 2014, the Santa Clara Unified School District purchased 59.4 acres of the former Agnews Developmental Center to build a K–12 educational facility. Agnew Elementary School and Huerta Middle School opened in 2021, and MacDonald High School opened in 2022.

In 2017, the district began paying for certain college entrance and Advanced Placement exams to eliminate barriers for low-income students.

On March 13, 2020, (Note: Students were not in attendance on March 13, 2020, because of an unrelated professional development day. School closures went into effect on March 16, 2020.) the Santa Clara County Public Health Department announced the closure of all public schools in the county due to the COVID-19 pandemic. At the time of the closure, no SCUSD students or staff had tested positive for COVID-19. The district began distance learning on March 24, 2020, for grades 6–12 and on March 30, 2020, for grades K–5. Distance learning continued into the 2020–2021 academic year. Schools began a phased reopening with a hybrid learning format on March 29, 2021. The district fully reopened for the 2021–2022 academic year with several precautions, including mask-wearing and weekly COVID-19 screening.

In 2023, the Santa Clara Unified School District introduced a student senate consisting of one representative from each high school. The district kept the previously-established student trustee position.

The Santa Clara Unified School District implemented phone- and device-free policies across all schools at the start of the 2025–2026 academic year in accordance with California's Phone-Free School Act.

Starting in the 2025-2026 school year, incumbent superintendent Damon J. Wright oversaw a significant reduction in teachers and faculty in the entire school district. His aim is to correct a $30,000,000 dollar deficit in the districts' finances due to decreasing enrollment and overstaffing. His policies were met with major opposition from students, staff, and community members.

==== Superintendents ====
- Lawrence C. Curtis (1966–1970)
- James W. Hoffner (1970–1973)
- Donald J. Callejon (1973–1974)
- Rudy Gatti (1974–1989)
- Donald J. Callejon (1989–1990)
- Robert Carter (1990–1993)
- Nicholas Gervase (1993–1994)
- Paul Perotti (1994–2005)
- Rod Adams (2005–2008)
- Steve Stavis (2008–2011)
- Bobbie Plough (2011–2013)
- Stanley Rose III (2013–2019)
- Stella M. Kemp (2019–2022)
- Gary Waddell (2022–2025)
- Damon J. Wright (2025–present)

== Administration ==
SCUSD is a public school district governed by an elected Board of Trustees, which appoints the superintendent. The SCUSD Board of Trustees consists of seven members who serve four-year terms. In 2022, the district switched from at-large board member elections to district-based representation.

The district has a six-member student senate with one representative from each high school. One member serves on the Board of Trustees.

The Santa Clara Unified School District's budget was $531.9 million in 2024.

== Schools ==
Schools (2025–2026)
Name	Grades	Opened	City	Students	FTE Teachers	Pupil/Teacher Ratio
Abram Agnew Elementary School	K–5	2021	San Jose	317	15	21.13
Bowers Elementary School	K–5	1957	Santa Clara	232	13	17.85
Bracher Elementary School	K–5	1958	Santa Clara	236	15.55	15.18
Braly Elementary School	K–5	1855	Sunnyvale	352	19.4	18.14
Briarwood Elementary School	K–5	1956	Santa Clara	287	14.6	19.66
Buchser Middle School	6–8	1981	Santa Clara	715	39.67	18.02
Juan Cabrillo Middle School	6–8	1961	Santa Clara	817	43.43	18.81
Central Park Elementary School	K–5	1957	Santa Clara	430	19.1	22.51
Don Callejon Arts and Design School (formerly Don Callejon School 2006-2024)	TK–8	K-8: 2006, TK: 2025	Santa Clara	581	37.2	15.62
C. W. Haman Elementary School	K–5	1952	Santa Clara	319	16.4	19.45
Dolores Huerta Middle School	6–8	2021	San Jose	377	17.05	22.11
Kathryn Hughes Elementary School	K–5	1964	Santa Clara	270	15	18
Laurelwood Elementary School	K–5	1964	Santa Clara	521	22.1	23.57
Kathleen MacDonald High School	9–12	2022	San Jose	209	14.07	14.85
George Mayne Elementary School	K–5	1955	Alviso	300	14	21.43
Millikin Elementary School	K–5	1855	Santa Clara	518	22	23.55
Mission Early College High School	10–12	2017	Santa Clara	159	6.93	22.94
Montague Elementary School	K–5	1961	Santa Clara	272	16	17
New Valley High School	9–12	2001	Santa Clara	169	13.3	12.71
Marian A. Peterson Middle School	6–8	1981	Sunnyvale	729	35.87	20.32
Pomeroy Elementary School	K–5	1952	Santa Clara	300	16.51	18.17
Ponderosa Elementary School	K–5	1964	Sunnyvale	501	22.7	22.07
Santa Clara Adult Education	Adult	1981	Santa Clara	581	Unknown	Unknown
Santa Clara Community Day School	6–12	2011	Santa Clara	10	2.03	4.93
Santa Clara High School	9–12	1872	Santa Clara	1,849	92.81	19.92
Scott Lane Elementary School	K–5	1952	Santa Clara	396	19	20.84
Sutter Elementary School	K–5	1962	Santa Clara	305	15.1	20.2
Washington Open Elementary School	K–5	1961	Santa Clara	309	16	19.31
Westwood Elementary School	K–5	1954	Santa Clara	382	18.1	21.1
Adrian C. Wilcox High School	9–12	1961	Santa Clara	1,859	92.45	20.11
Wilson High School	9–12	1982	Santa Clara	163	16.32	9.99
District totals (2023–2024)				14,236	730.92	19.48

Closed Schools (Note: Multiple sources:)
Name	Opened	Closed	City	Namesake
Agnew Elementary School (Note: This school is distinct from the current Abram Agnew Elementary School, which opened in 2021 and is located in San Jose.)	1958	1975	Santa Clara	Abram Agnew, philanthropist who settled in the Santa Clara Valley in 1873
Bennett Elementary School	1957	1978	Santa Clara	W. S. Bennett, owner of a tract of land south of Homestead Road
Brown Elementary School	1963	1979	Santa Clara	Walter G. Brown, secretary of Jefferson Union School District
Emil R. Buchser High School (Note: Current location of Santa Clara High School)	1957	1981	Santa Clara	Emil R. Buchser Sr., final superintendent of the Santa Clara Elementary and Union High School Districts
Lawrence Curtis Elementary School (Note: Property still owned by SCUSD)	1965	1981	Santa Clara	Lawrence C. Curtis, final superintendent of the Jefferson Union School District and first superintendent of SCUSD
Lawrence Curtis Intermediate School	1958	1965 (Note: Converted into an elementary school in 1965)	Santa Clara	Lawrence C. Curtis, final superintendent of the Jefferson Union School District and first superintendent of SCUSD
Fremont Elementary School	1867	1966	Santa Clara	John C. Frémont, explorer and U.S. senator from California
Jefferson Intermediate School	1927	1975	Santa Clara	
Mariposa Elementary School (Note: Current location of Millikin Elementary School)	1956	1978	Santa Clara	
Montgomery Elementary School	1963	1975	Santa Clara	John Joseph Montgomery, pioneer aviator and professor at Santa Clara University
Monticello Elementary School	1961	1981	Santa Clara	
Nadine Bollinger McCoy Elementary School	1959	1975	Santa Clara	Nadine Bollinger McCoy, clerk of the Santa Clara Elementary and Union High School Districts
Patrick Henry Intermediate School	1962	1979	Sunnyvale	Patrick Henry, Founding Father of the U.S.
Marian A. Peterson High School (Note: Current location of Peterson Middle School)	1965	1981	Sunnyvale	Marian A. Peterson, board member of the Santa Clara Elementary and Union High School Districts
Raynor Elementary School	1957	1979	Sunnyvale	Raymond and Eleanor Bryant, children of landowners Clarence and Clara Bryant
William A. Wilson Intermediate School	1955	1981	Santa Clara	William A. Wilson Sr., school board member and president of the Santa Clara Elementary and Union High School Districts

=== High schools ===
==== Kathleen MacDonald High School ====
MacDonald High School opened in 2022 and is the newest school in the Santa Clara Unified School District.

==== Mission Early College High School ====
Mission Early College High School is a dual enrollment partnership with the West Valley–Mission Community College District. It was established in 2017 as a college immersion program to replace the former Mission Middle College Program.

==== New Valley High School ====
New Valley High School is a small alternative continuation high school.

==== Santa Clara High School ====
Santa Clara High School is the oldest school in the Santa Clara Unified School District. It moved to the campus of then-Emil R. Buchser High School in 1981.

==== Adrian C. Wilcox High School ====
Wilcox High School opened in 1961 and is named after Adrian Clyde Wilcox, a longtime Santa Clara Union High School board member.

==== Wilson High School ====
Wilson High School is an alternative school established in 1982.

== Demographics ==
Historical enrollment
Year	Enr.	±%
1967	23,798	—
1982	14,119	−40.7%
1990	13,907	−1.5%
2000	14,587	+4.9%
2010	14,939	+2.4%
2020	15,306	+2.5%
2026	14,303	−6.6%
Source: 1967, 1982–2020, 2026

As of May 2025, approximatley 38.1% of SCUSD students are Hispanic or Latino, 31.1% are Asian, and approximately 15.9% are white. As of 2024, 22.1% of students are English learners, and 32.6% are considered socioeconomically disadvantaged.

== Teacher housing ==
In 2001, the Santa Clara Unified School District began construction on subsidized townhouses for staff. An initial 40 units opened in April 2002 and cost roughly $6 million to build, funded through certificates of participation and rental income. A $6-million second phase was built in 2008 and opened in 2009. The complex is the first subsidized teacher housing in California and has encouraged other school districts to consider similar initiatives.

== Transportation ==
As of the 2023–2024 academic year, the Santa Clara Unified School District has a fleet of 29 school buses. In 2020, SCUSD received four electric buses through the Carl Moyer Grant Program.

SCUSD Bus Fleet (2023–2024)
Make/model	Year	Seating capacity	Energy source	Quantity
Thomas Saf-T-Liner ER	1993	90	Diesel	1
Blue Bird TC/2000	1998	84	Diesel	1
Thomas MVP-ER	1998	84	Diesel	1
Blue Bird All American A3RE	1999	84	Diesel	1
Blue Bird All American A3RE	2000	84	Diesel	6
Thomas MVP-ER	2002	84	Diesel	1
Thomas HDX	2003	84	Diesel	6
Blue Bird All American D3RE	2013	78	Diesel	2
Blue Bird All American T3RE	2015	78	Diesel	6
Blue Bird All American T3RE Electric	2020	81	Electric	4

SCUSD Decommissioned Buses
Make/model	In service	Seating capacity	Energy source	Quantity
Blue Bird All American, Gen 2	1983–2013	Unknown	Diesel	2
Blue Bird All American, Gen 3	1990–2020	Unknown	Diesel	4
