= Mission College (California) =

Public college in Santa Clara, California, US

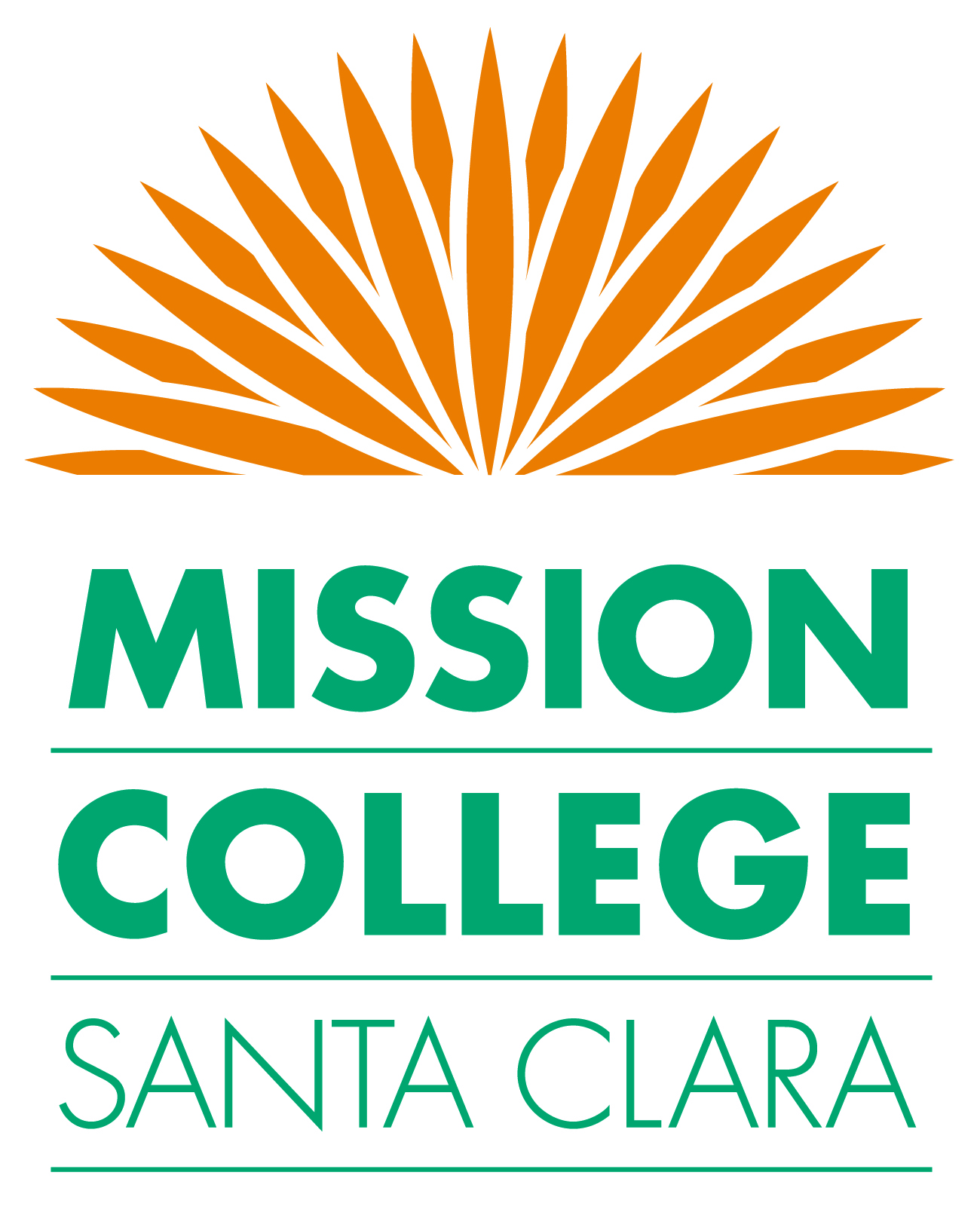
- Motto: Where today's students meet tomorrow's opportunity
- Type: Public community college
- Established: 1975
- Affiliations: West Valley–Mission Community College District
- Chancellor: Brad Davis
- President: Seher Awan
- Students: 10,221
- Location: Santa Clara, California, United States; 37°23′28″N 121°58′56″W
- Colors: Teal, orange, black, and white
- Website: www.missioncollege.edu

Mission College (Mission or MC) is a public community college in Santa Clara, California. It is part of the West Valley–Mission Community College District. The land the college is on was bought between 1966 and 1967. Mission College opened for its first year in 1975. In 1979 it had grown to "3,500 students, 8 administrators, and 73 instructors".

== History ==
The Mission College Interim Campus was housed on the site of the vacant Jefferson Middle School at the corner of Monroe Street and Lawrence Express in Santa Clara, California in early September, 1975. From this humble beginning, three members originally appointed for full-time duty—Teri Chiang (Mathematics), Don Joslen (Fine Arts), and Son Le (Philosophy)) worked with Administrator Burt Hermosillo with the support of several part-time faculty volunteers from West Valley College to offer morning and evening classes. By summer, 1976, the Governing Board had appointed Warren Sorenson as founding president. Mission College's first commencement took place in June 1977 with the president of Santa Clara University as commencement speaker. Notably, among a handful of graduates for Mission College Class '77 was Eddie Sousa, who was later elected mayor of Santa Clara. The birth of Mission College seemed uneventful; its full development was not, however. Reported disputes over noise levels at West Valley College with its Saratoga residents helped changed the membership of the long-serving Governing Board, leading in upper management changes at both West Valley and Mission Colleges soon after the new Mission College campus was completed in 1979. Even though the departure of its founding president was unexpected, among many legacies of his was Mission College's commitment students as individual learners: individualized self-paced learning, decades before the advent of the digital revolution and cyber learning.

The 12 acres of land that was today's Mission College was bought in Santa Clara in between 1966 and 1967. Later, by 1970, 164 acres of land in total was bought and acquired. The first piece of the Mission College Interim Campus construction plan was completed during 1979, which is also the start of the 1979–80 academic year, which enrolled about 3,500 students, 8 administrators, and 73 instructors.

The Mission College Interim Campus was incorporated into the West Valley-Mission Community College District upon the recommendation of Chancellor Gustavo A. Mellander in September 1985. By that time, Mission College has prided itself on having a large diversity of academic learning approaches. The campus' architecture was also designed to increase interaction among its students and faculty, which results in a more effective learning environment.

The college has hosted a number of speakers, including Pulitzer Prize winning author Sonia Nazario, Civil Rights activist Cornel West, Tuskegee Airman Les Williams, and former Santa Clara Assistant District Attorney Rolanda Pierre Dixon.

The college's art department also hosts exhibits at its Vargas Gallery in the Gillmor Center. The Mission College Symphony is celebrating its 10th season in 2016–17.

The Hospitality Management program runs lunch service on Tuesdays and Thursdays. Formerly called the Owl Cove, it is now called the Mission Bistro. The restaurant was renovated between 2009 and 2012.

== Organization and administration ==
Mission College is part of Silicon Valley's West Valley–Mission Community College District, which also administers West Valley College in nearby Saratoga, California. It is part of the California Community Colleges System. The district serves the cities of Saratoga, Campbell, Los Gatos, Morgan Hill, Monte Sereno, Santa Clara, and San Jose. The district's headquarters are on the campus of West Valley College.

== Campus ==
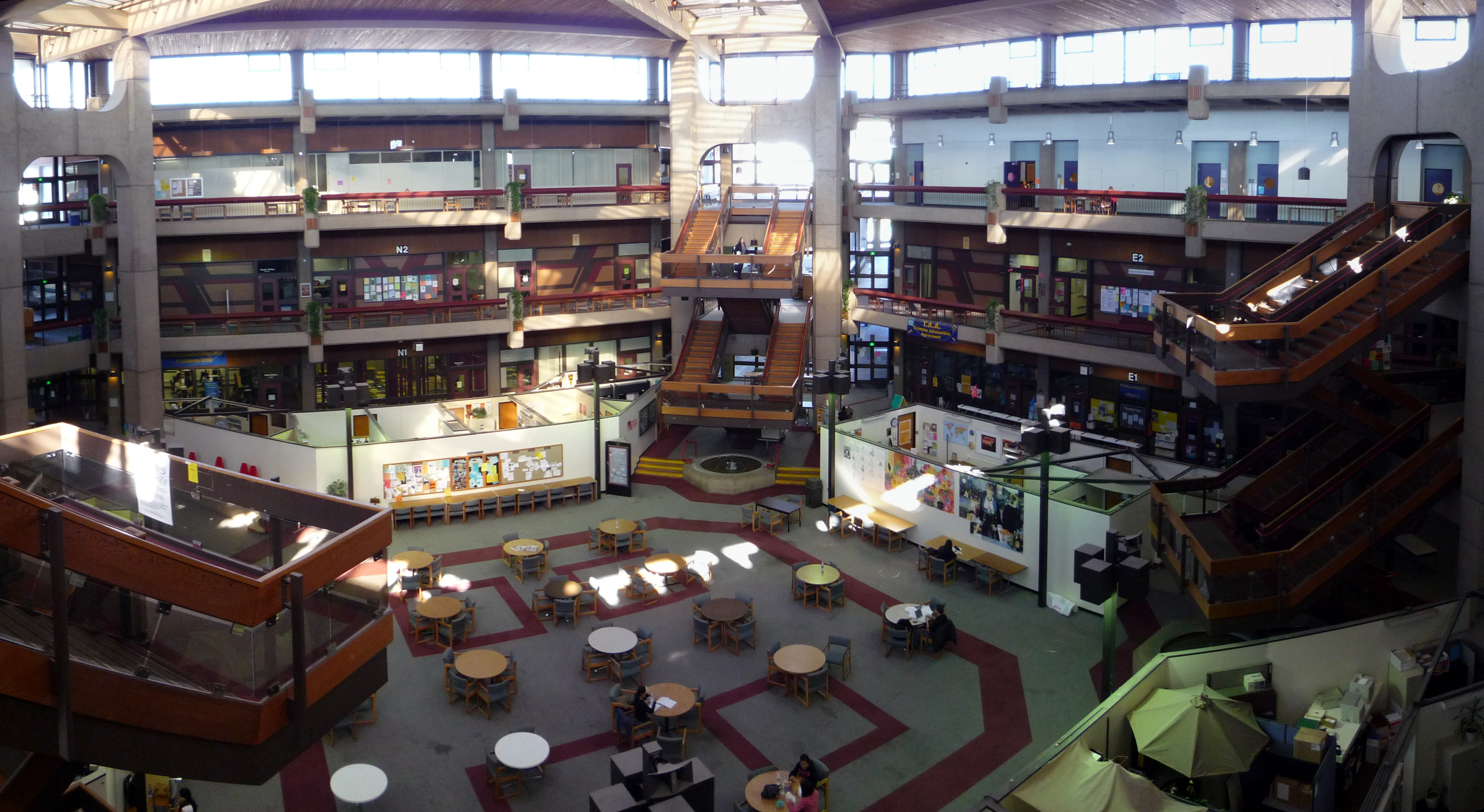
Interior of the Main Building

The college originally was focused on a single large structure where most of the classes took place. In 2014, the Gillmor Family Center opened, with classrooms and labs on three floors. The library, cafeteria, and bookstore are in nearby buildings. A separate building houses the science departments. The Hospitality Management building includes the "Mission Bistro", which serves lunch on Tuesdays and Thursdays during the Fall and Spring semesters.

The campus is immediately north of the Mercado shopping center and west of facilities of EMC and McAfee. The Campus is also located relatively close to Levi Station and Great America.

In May 2014 the Gillmor Center opened, named after former Santa Clara mayor Gary Gillmor. The building houses 50 percent of the college's class room and is a LEED Gold Building. Gillmor was the city's first elected mayor and helped facilitate the land sale that eventually became Mission College.

Its parking lot hosts 2,640 high-efficiency SunPower solar panels, which are estimated to save the college $9 million in the next 25 years following 2011.

In January 2011 the school opened its new Child Development Center preschool.

A new main building was under construction through 2017 and it was originally announced to be ready by Spring 2018. Ultimately the building, the Student Engagement Center, was opened on January 24, 2018.

In 2025, Mission College was the first community college in the nation to give its students one free meal per day in an effort to combat food insecurity.

== Transportation ==
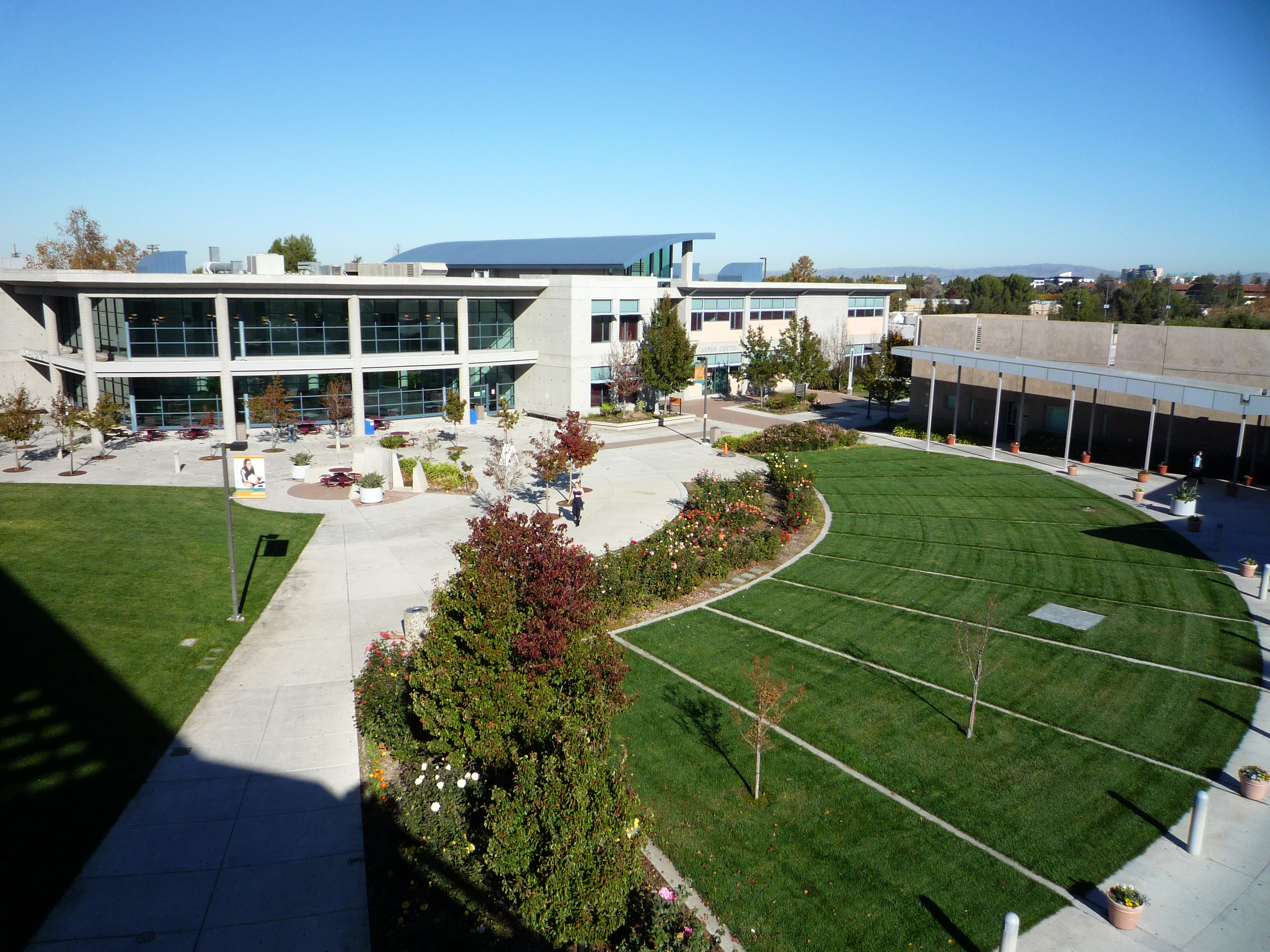
Campus Center

Mission College is reached from the California's Great America exit of U.S. Route 101. There are shuttles that are reachable with walks of a few blocks that connect to the Old Ironsides station of the VTA light rail, the Great America station of the Altamont Corridor Express, and the Lawrence station of Caltrain. VTA bus lines 57 and 60 stop in the college's front loop. While the new main building is under construction, VTA bus lines 57 and 60 stop in a section in the college's parking lot.

== Student demographics ==
Ethnicity of student enrollment (Spring 2017):

- African-American 3.7%
- American Indian/Alaskan Native 0.2%
- Asian 37.7%
- Filipino 9.6%
- Hispanic 27.2%
- Multi-Ethnicity3.7%
- Pacific-Islander 0.4%
- Unknown/Non-Respondent 1.1%
- White Non-Hispanic 16.6%

Gender (Spring 2017): The majority of students at Mission College are women (55%)

Age Group (Spring 2017):

- 19 or less 17.9%
- 20–24 31.3%
- 25–29 17.1%
- 30–34 10.1%
- 35–39 7.3%
- 40–49 8.5%
- 50+ 7.8%
- Unknown 0.0%

== Clubs ==
Mission College has a variety of clubs: Alpha Gamma Sigma, Associated Student Government, Fire Tech Student Association, The Florets, Future Accountants of America, Kinesiology Club, MC Dance Company, MC Health Occupations Association, Mission Inter-Connect, Muslim Student Association, Puente Club, Umoja Community Club, Veterans with Associates.

== Student Services ==
Mission college also provides various student services including Counseling, Admissions and Records, Assessment Center, Career Center, Tutoring Center, STEM program, DSPS, Veteran's Resource Center, CalWORKS program, EOPS, etc.

== Sports ==
Mission College has men's and women's tennis, women's basketball, softball, women's badminton, baseball. It began a new website in February 2017 at missionsaints.com. In March 2026 the college changed from the Saints to the Monarchs

== Notable alumni ==
- Matt Stonie — YouTuber and competitive eater ranked number three in Major League Eating
- Zain Zaidi - Tech entrepreneur and philanthropist

== See also ==
- West Valley College
