= Santa Clara High School (Santa Clara, California) =

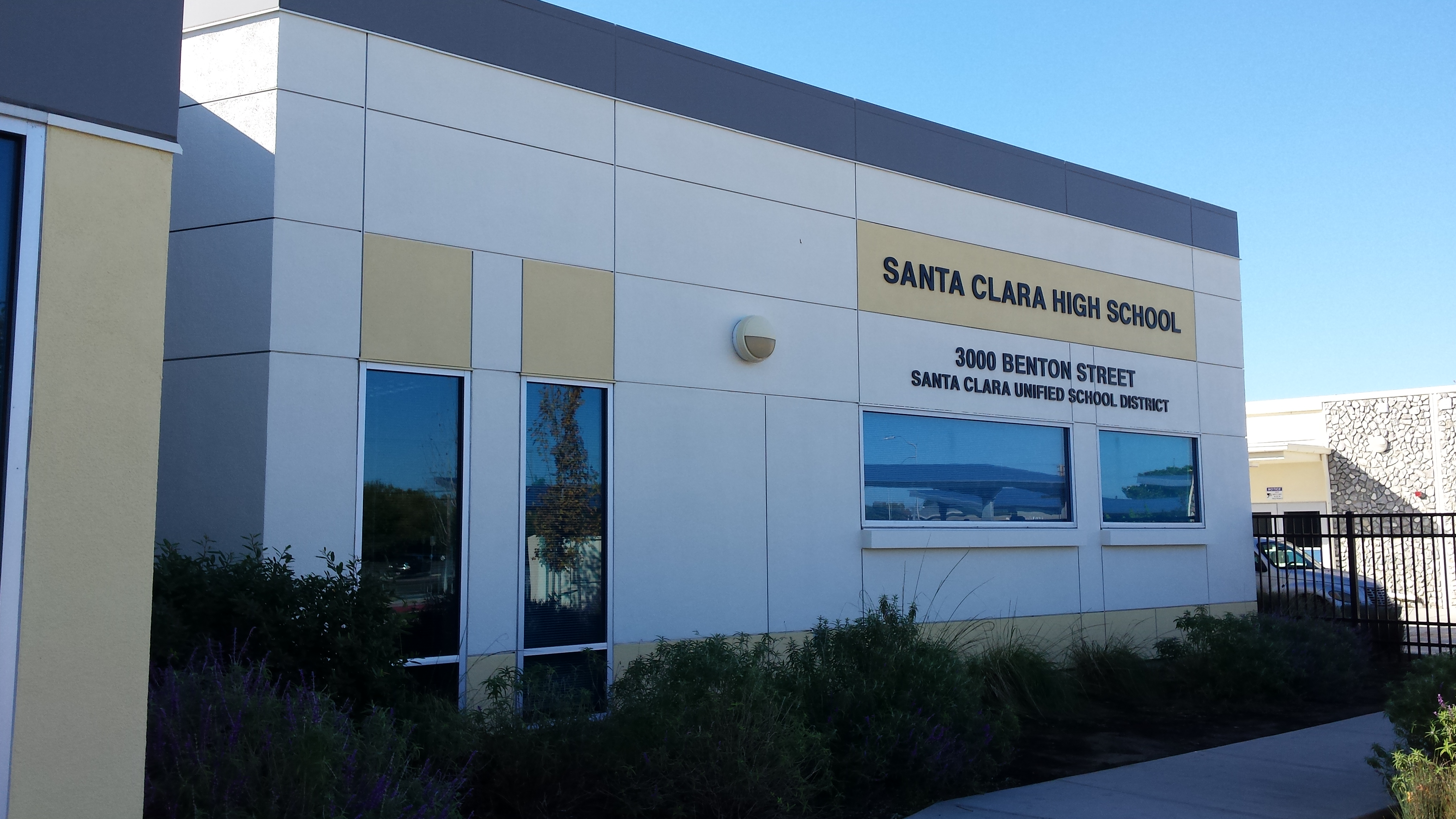

Location
- 3000 Benton Street; Santa Clara, California; United States; 37.34591°N 121.98179°W

Information
- Type: Public secondary school
- Motto: Home of the Bruins!
- Established: 1872
- Principal: Gregory Shelby
- Grades: 9–12
- Enrollment: 1,732 (2023–2024)
- Colors: Royal blue Gold
- Team name: Bruins
- Rival: Adrian C. Wilcox High School
- Newspaper: The Roar
- Website: santaclara.santaclarausd.org

Santa Clara High School is a comprehensive, co-educational, public high school located in Santa Clara, California, United States. It is one of five high schools in the Santa Clara Unified School District (SCUSD).

== History ==
In 1872, Santa Clara High School opened in the downtown area on the same property as the Santa Clara Grammar School. In 1905, the board of education oversaw the construction of a new building at a different site, and the high school moved the following year.

In 1981, rival Buchser High School closed, and Santa Clara High School moved to its campus. (Note: The former site of Santa Clara High School was repurposed as Buchser Middle School.) Because of the influx of former Buchser students into the Santa Clara student body, the school changed its mascot, logo, and yearbook name.

Santa Clara High shares a longstanding rivalry with crosstown Wilcox High School.

== Swimming ==
San Jose State University Alumnus George Haines formed the Santa Clara Swim Club on campus in 1950. By 1960, seven swimmers from the club had qualified for the Olympics. The success of the club attracted swimmers to the high school. As a result of the club, the original Santa Clara High School was responsible for assembling the most Olympic gold medalists from a single high school.

== Student Activities ==
=== FIRST Robotics ===
Santa Clara High School is home to multiple FIRST Tech Challenge teams.

=== Science Fair ===
There are a notable number of Science Fair winners from Santa Clara High, at the local, state, and international level.

Rig Saini placed 2nd in the Biomedical Engineering category at the International Science and Engineering Fair (ISEF) in 2026, while Gauri Todur placed 3rd in the Physics and Astronomy category in 2024.

== Notable alumni ==
- Mark Spitz - 2nd in all-time total golds in any Olympics- Olympic gold medal swimmer
- Nezza Hernandez (Class of 2011) - Singer, song writer, professional dancer
- Margaret Jenkins - pioneer in women's sports/world class track and field/Olympic competitor
- Nino Bongiovanni - Major League Baseball outfielder
- Joe Bottom - Olympic silver medalist; two-time world record holder; Swimming Hall of Fame
- Donna De Varona - Olympic gold medal swimmer
- George Haines - USA, Olympic, and UCLA swimming coach
- Claudia Kolb - Olympic gold medal swimmer
- Mike Garzoni - NFL football guard
- Ken Powell - chairman, General Mills
- Harry Lew - former U.S. Marine
- Don Schollander - Olympic gold medal swimmer
- Heather Simmons-Carrasco - Olympic gold medalist in synchronized swimming
- Carol Speed - actress
- Julia Allender - Former Collegiate Basketball Coach
- Gloria Nevarez (Class of 1989) - Commissioner of Mountain West Conference and Former Commissioner of West Coast Conference
- Scott Morse Comic Book artist and writer
