= High school in the United States =

Institution which provides all or part of secondary education

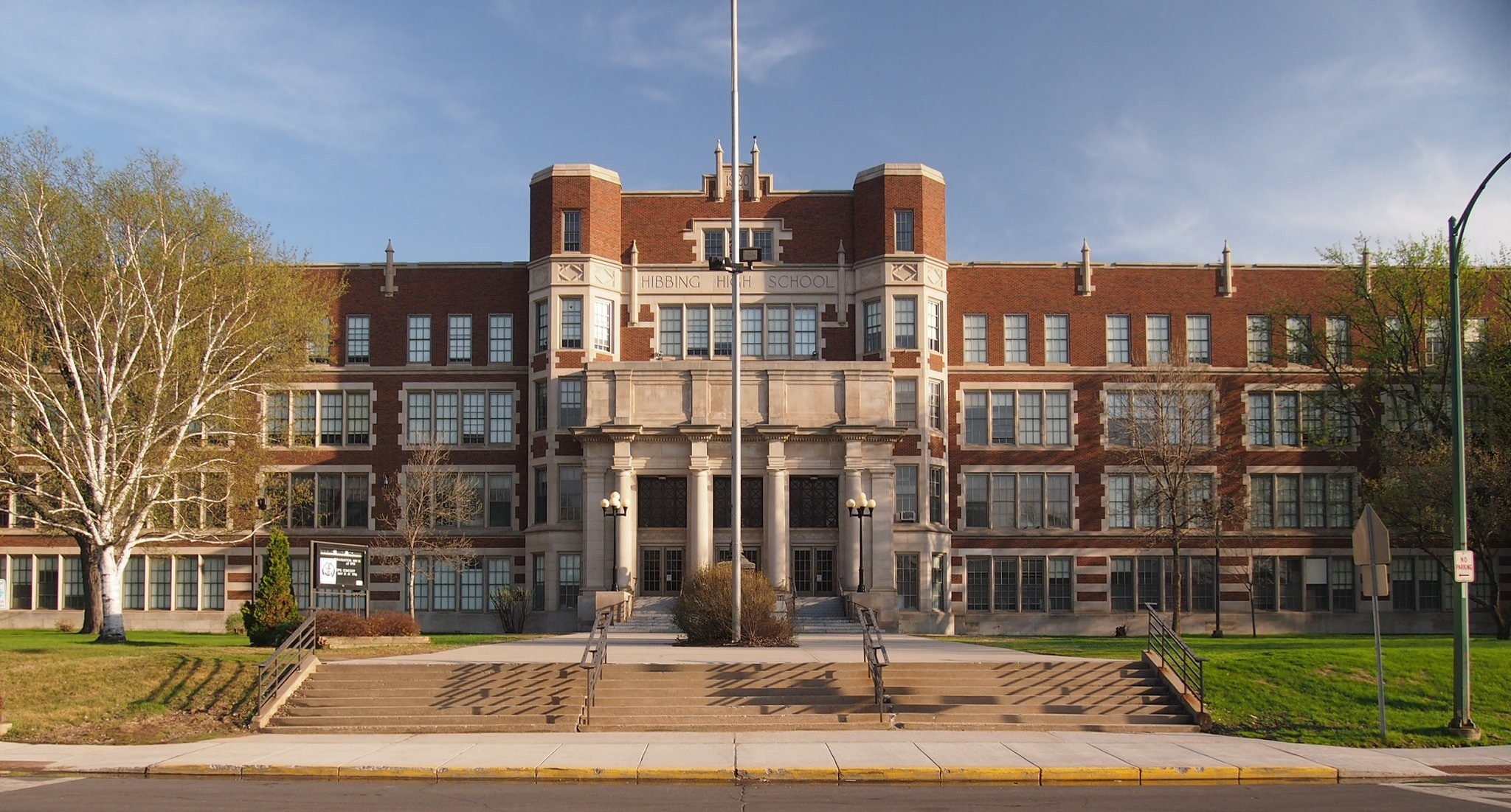
Hibbing High School in Hibbing, Minnesota

High school or senior high school is the education students receive in the final stage of secondary education in the United States. In the United States, most high schoolers are ages 14–18, but some ages could be delayed due to how their birthday coincides with the academic calendar. Most comparable to secondary schools, high schools generally deliver phase three of the ISCED model of education. High schools have subject-based classes. The name high school is applied in other countries, but no universal generalization can be made as to the age range, financial status, or ability level of the pupils accepted. In North America, most high schools include grades 9 through 12. Students attend them following graduation from middle school (often alternatively called junior high school).

== History ==
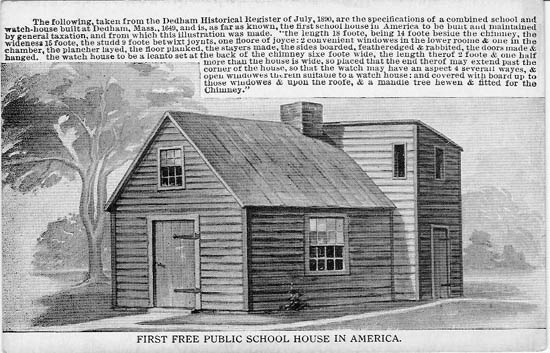
The first taxpayer-funded public school in the United States was in Dedham, Massachusetts.

As late as 1900, high school attendance was very rare in the United States, with only a small percentage of the population ever attending high school. In the first half to two-thirds of the twentieth century increasing numbers of students attended, and it became an expected part of almost all students' education.

The first institution labeled as a "high school" was Edinburgh's Royal High School in Scotland, which was founded in 1128. The Royal High School was used as a model for the first public high school in the United States, Boston Latin School, founded in Boston, Massachusetts in 1635. Boston Latin School was initially a private school, so although it did become the first public high school, a school system in Dedham, Massachusetts was the first to be supported by public taxation. The schools prepared boys for the law or the church. The length of the school day varied with the seasons, but there was a shortage of Latin speakers available to become teachers because the job was unattractive due to low status and low pay. The colony ordered that The Protestant Tutor, Instructing Youth and Others, in the Compleat Method of Spelling, Reading, and Writing, True English: To Which is Prefix'd, a Timely Memorial to all True Protestants, retitled The New England Primer, be used as a textbook. This was the start of a secondary education system.

In 1642, the Massachusetts Bay Colony was able to pass a law to require parents to make sure that their children were able to read, which required some form of elementary education. In 1647, Massachusetts again passed a law that required communities to establish some type of public schooling system. Elementary schools were to be formed in every town with 50 or more families, and every town with at least 100 families would have to provide a Latin Grammar School.

Over a century later in 1779, Thomas Jefferson proposed the opening of new secondary schools to provide segregated secondary schools with different tracks in his words for "the laboring and the learned." The new academies would be practical in nature but allow a few of the working class to advance by "raking a few geniuses from the rubbish."

In 1785, before the U.S. Constitution was ratified, the Continental Congress passed a law calling for a survey of the Northwest Territory, which included what was to become the state of Ohio. The law created townships, reserving a portion of each township for a local school. Under the constitution, education was relegated to individual states.

The Pennsylvania state constitution, written in 1790, calls for free public education, but only for poor children, assuming that the rich will pay for their own children's schooling. In 1805, the New York Public School Society was formed by the wealthy to provide education to the poor. These schools were run on the Lancasterian system, in which one "master" taught hundreds of students in a single room. The masters would give rote lessons to the older students, who would then pass it down to the younger students. Society was moving from an agrarian model with small independent plots to an industrial one, where workers needed to be literate and numerate. Lancastrian schools emphasized discipline and obedience: qualities that factory owners needed in their workers.

An 1817 Boston Town Meeting petitioned for the establishment of a system of free public primary schools. The main support came from local merchants, businessmen, and wealthier artisans, while many wage earners opposed it because they knew they would be paying for it through income taxation. In spite of this, Boston Latin School became public in 1820. This was the first public high school in the United States. Seven years later, a state law in Massachusetts made all grades of public school open to all pupils, free of charge.

However, in slave-owning states public schooling in rural areas generally did not extend beyond the elementary grades for either whites or blacks. This was known as "eighth grade school". After 1900, some cities began to establish high schools, primarily for middle class whites. In the 1930s roughly one fourth of the US population still lived and worked on farms and few rural Southerners of either race went beyond the 8th grade until after 1945.

Even after public schools were being opened up to all ages in Massachusetts, in the 1830s, it was illegal in southern states to teach black children to read. High schools were out of the question. After many years of advocacy, in 1957, federal court ordered the integration of Little Rock, Arkansas public schools. The governor sent in troops to physically prevent nine African American students from enrolling at all-white Central High School. Though, this decision was overturned by the president. The same delay in equality in public high schools can be accounted for the general regarding of other groups as minorities in the US.

== Typical American high school ==
While there is no set standard for American high schools, some generalizations can be made about the majority. Public schools are managed by local, elected school districts. There is a range in quality from basic education to more intellectually-stimulating environments for students approximately 14 to 18 years of age.

Students enter around the age of 14 and pass through four years (sometimes five):

- Freshman (ninth grade; the equivalent of the year 10 in the English System)
- Sophomore (tenth grade; the equivalent of year 11 in the English System)
- Junior (eleventh grade; the equivalent of year 12 in the English System)
- Senior (twelfth grade; the equivalent of year 13 in the English System)

School years are normally around nine months long (from August or September to May or June), and are broken up into quarters or semesters. College entry is controlled by many factors including Grade Point Average (GPA), and an elective SAT or ACT exam run by two non-profit organizations: the College Board and the ACT, respectively.

Smaller schools can educate fewer than 200 pupils in total, while some teach over 4,000 at any given time.

=== Typical day ===
The typical high school day includes:

- Students arrive between seven and nine in the morning and leave school between two and four in the afternoon.
- Four to eight 40 to 90 minute class periods, broken up by around five minutes to get to the next class. Schools may hold classes daily for a shorter time (traditional scheduling) or alternate days for an extended session (block scheduling).
- A lunch break (some schools permit students to leave campus to eat, though most hold lunches on-site).
- Homework amount differs depending on the school's purpose and culture.
- Extracurricular sports team activities right after school (sometimes track, field, and swim sports hold practices in the early morning before the school day starts)

=== Focus ===
The high school may emphasize various opportunities for students:

- general education
- high-achieving college prep (e.g., Advanced Placement (AP))
- vocational-technical
- specialties such as arts, music, theater, STEM (science, technology, engineering, and mathematics)
- sports

=== Curriculum ===
A high school curriculum is defined in terms of Carnegie Units, which approximate to 120 class contact hours within a year. This is one hour a day, five days a week for twenty-four weeks. Students who satisfactorily complete a unit are awarded a credit. No two schools will be the same, and no two students will have the same classes. There are some general principles, however. Students can also be on different programs within the same school with Advanced/Honors, CP (College Preparatory), AP (Advanced Placement), and IB (International Baccalaureate) classes.

Students typically do four years of study, with eight core subjects and electives, both of which vary by school. Passing a course earns credit. Among other requirements, students must earn a certain number of credits to graduate, the number of which varies by state. Study halls are sometimes offered, which don't contribute to GPA or number of credits earned.

==== Grading ====
Primarily, evaluations can be expressed as a percentage score or a letter grade. For percentage scores, the typical practice is to start at 100% and deduct points for deficiencies.

The relationship between percentage scores and letter grades depends on the method of grading. In the absence of national grading standards, some high schools use norm-referenced grading (commonly called "grading on a curve") which allocates grades across the distribution of scores based on a predetermined formula. Most high schools, though, use criterion-referenced grading which corresponds percentages to letter grades according to a fixed scale:

Percentage	< 60%	60% – 69%	70% – 79%	80% – 89%	≥ 90%
Grade	F	D	C	B	A
Point equivalents	0.0	1.0	2.0	3.0	4.0

For each course, the student's assignment scores or grades across the term are averaged according to weights established by the teacher. This produces the course grade. A report card lists all of the student's course grades for the term, translates these to grade point equivalents, and calculates a Grade Point Average (GPA) weighted by the number of credits earned for each class. A transcript lists the course grades received during the student's entire tenure at the school and compiles them into a cumulative GPA.

=== Physical education requirements ===
2014 recommended federal standards for Physical Education are at least 225 minutes of P.E. a week for middle school and high school. The standards involve:

- Competency in motor skills and movement patterns,
- Understanding of movement concepts,
- Regular participation in physical activity,
- Achievement and maintenance of health‐related fitness,
- Responsible behavior in physical activity settings, and
- Value of physical activity.

== Private vs public high school ==
Parents in the United States have the option to enroll their children in either a private or public high school. While there is evidence that shows private schools tend to perform better academically than public schools, this can often be attributed to other factors than just the type of school, such as the education levels of parents and median family income and private schools tend to have students from families with higher median incomes and families where one or both parents are college educated. There are a number of additional differences between public and private education, such as cost, class size, curriculum, diversity, and teacher certification.

=== Cost ===
Public high school is paid for by taxpayers, making it a free state-sponsored educational program. As of 2024 private schools had an average tuition between $10,000–$28,000 per school year, depending on the state & specific institution. The average cost of private school attendance from kindergarten through 4 years of postsecondary school can be up to $308,000. And annual tuition at an average private high school can be $15,000.

=== Teacher credentials ===
Teachers in public school systems are required to complete a process of certification in order to teach within their particular state usually within a specific content or subject area and grade levels. Requirements for certification vary from state to state, making it necessary for teachers to complete a unique certification for every state in which they wish to teach, though many states have some sort of license reciprocity with other states.

Private schools, however, do not universally require teachers to be state certified or certified within a specific subject area to teach in their educational institutions, though this varies by school. Teachers at private schools can also sometimes have more flexibility in creating their curriculum, as private schools tend to not be driven or required to reach state requirements outlined for students in public schools.

=== Class size ===
Class sizes in public schools, on average, tend to be larger than those of private schools, though this will vary significantly between schools and districts based on location and available resources. Private schools reserve the right to take a limited number of students per year based on the requirements they set for student admission. Public schools are required to accept all school-age children within their district, regardless of space and staffing availability.

=== School selection ===
School selection for private schools is generally driven by cost of tuition, distance to a given school, and other factors like available academic and athletic offerings, special education services, facilities, and general environment. In public schools, the school a student attends is generally determined by where that student lives based on their school district. In larger school districts, attendance boundaries within the district determine where a student attends school. In many states and school districts, however, parents often have open enrollment options to have their child enrolled at a different school within the same district, known as intradistrict enrollment, or they can transfer to a school in another district, known as interdistrict enrollment. The availability of either option varies from state to state and from district to district. Many districts prohibit or limit open enrollment from outside their district or restrict it to only neighboring districts, often for space or budgetary reasons. In smaller school districts that only have one high school, intradistrict enrollment is not possible. School selection in public schools, like private, are also often driven by factors like distance to given school, academic and athletic offerings, special education services, facilities, and general environment when inter– or intradistrict enrollment options are available.

== List of school facilities/areas ==
- Lobby
- Main office
- Cafeteria
- Classrooms
- Computer lab / media lab
- Makerspace / fab lab
- Chemistry lab
- Woodshop / metalworking
- Library / commons area
- Teachers' lounge
- Art studio / design studio
- Home economics / community kitchen / sewing room
- Band room / choir room
- Photographic studio
- Music studio / podcast studio / video studio
- Lecture hall
- Auditorium / black box theater
- Career and technical education centers
- School nurse office
- School bus loading zones
- Courtyard
- Parking lots
- Amphitheatre
- Community garden

=== Athletic facilities ===
- Gymnasium
- Locker rooms
- Gymnastics facility
- Wrestling room
- Football field / soccer field
- Track and field
- Tennis court / pickleball court
- Baseball field / softball field
- Indoor practice facility
- Athletic trainer room
- Weight room
- Dance studio
- Swimming pool
- Skatepark
- Ice arena

== Sources ==
- David Angus and Jeffrey E. Mirel, The Failed Promise of the American High School, 1890-1995. Teachers College Press. 1999. ISBN 0807738425.
- William Reese. The Origins of the American High School. Yale University Press, 1995. ISBN 0300063849.
