= Donald Von Raesfeld Power Plant =

Donald Von Raesfeld (DVR) Power Plant
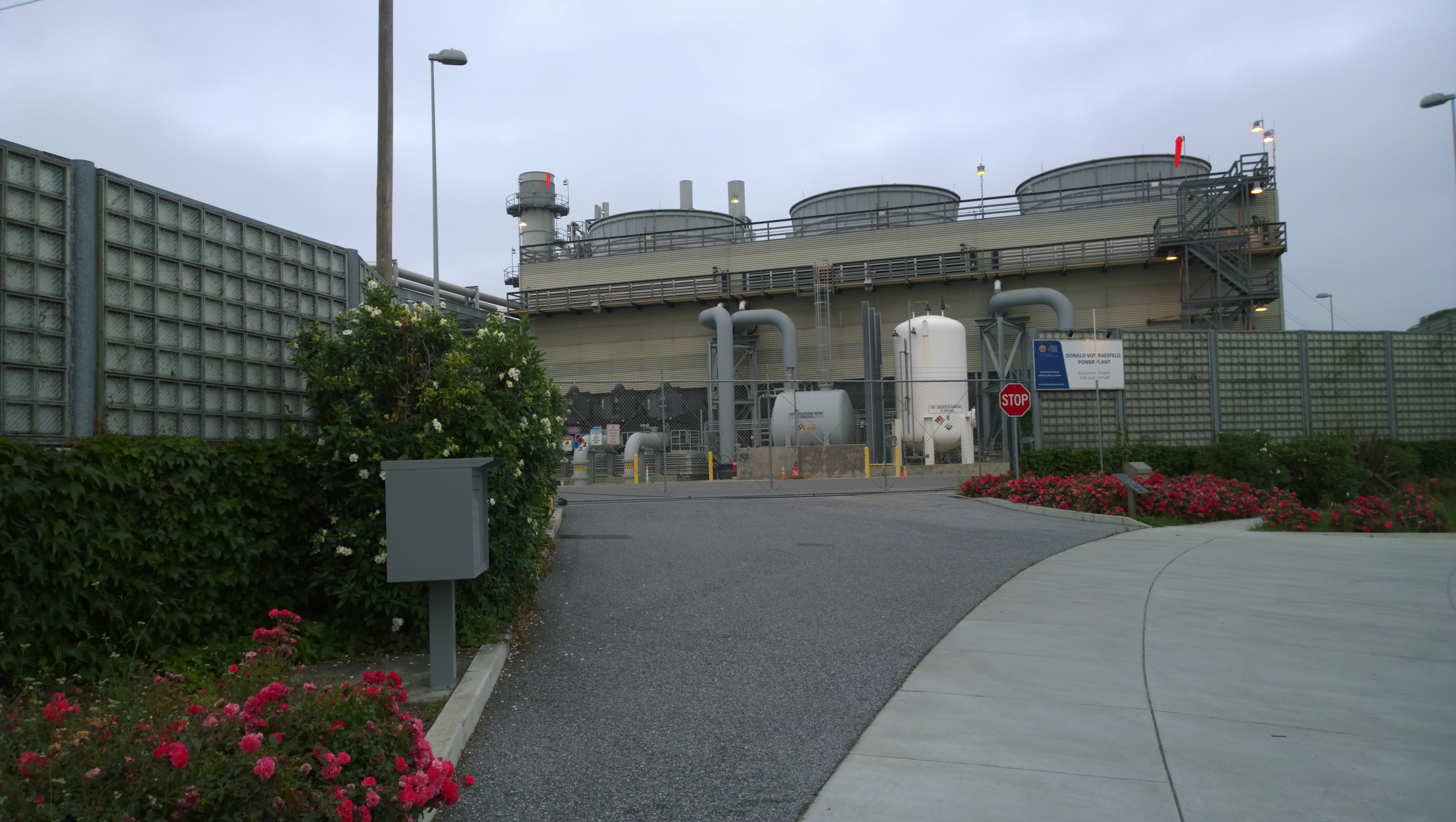
- Donald Von Raesfeld Power Plant
- Country: United States
- Location: 850 Duane Avenue; Santa Clara, California
- Coordinates: 37°22′37″N 121°57′4″W
- Status: Operational
- Commission date: 24 March 2005
- Owner: Silicon Valley Power
- Operator: Silicon Valley Power

Thermal power station
- Primary fuel: Natural gas
- Combined cycle?: Yes

Power generation
- Units operational: 2×1 combined-cycle (2 CT, 1 ST)
- Make and model: GE LM6000 Sprint CT
- Nameplate capacity: 147 MW peak (2×50 MW CT; 1×22 MW ST; 25 MW peak-firing)

External links
- Commons: Related media on Commons

The Donald Von Raesfeld Power Plant (DVRPP) is a natural gas power plant in Santa Clara, California, operated by Silicon Valley Power. Located near the San Jose International Airport it began operations in 2005 with a peak capacity of 147 megawatts.

DVRPP is a two-on-one combined cycle power plant, combining the output of two 50 MW combustion turbines with one 22 MW steam turbine. The steam is generated from the heated exhaust from each combustion turbine, and steam output may be increased to meet peaking demands by using exhaust duct-mounted natural gas burners.

== Infrastructure co-location ==
Santa Clara has been touted as the "data center capital of Silicon Valley" in part spurred by low power rates from Silicon Valley Power. DVRPP, along with a major Silicon Valley Power substation a block away, provide redundant high capacity power sources. In close proximity are major long-haul hubs for several Tier 1 Internet backbone providers for redundant high capacity Internet connection. Many large private and co-location data centers are located in or near Santa Clara, specifically the area surrounding DVRPP bounded by Hwy 101, Lafayette St, Central Expressway, Scott Boulevard and San Tomas Expressway.

== See also ==
- List of power stations in California
