= San Tomas Aquino Creek =

Stream in California, United States

San Tomas Aquinas Creek Arroyo de San Tomás Aquinas, San Tomas Aquino Creek
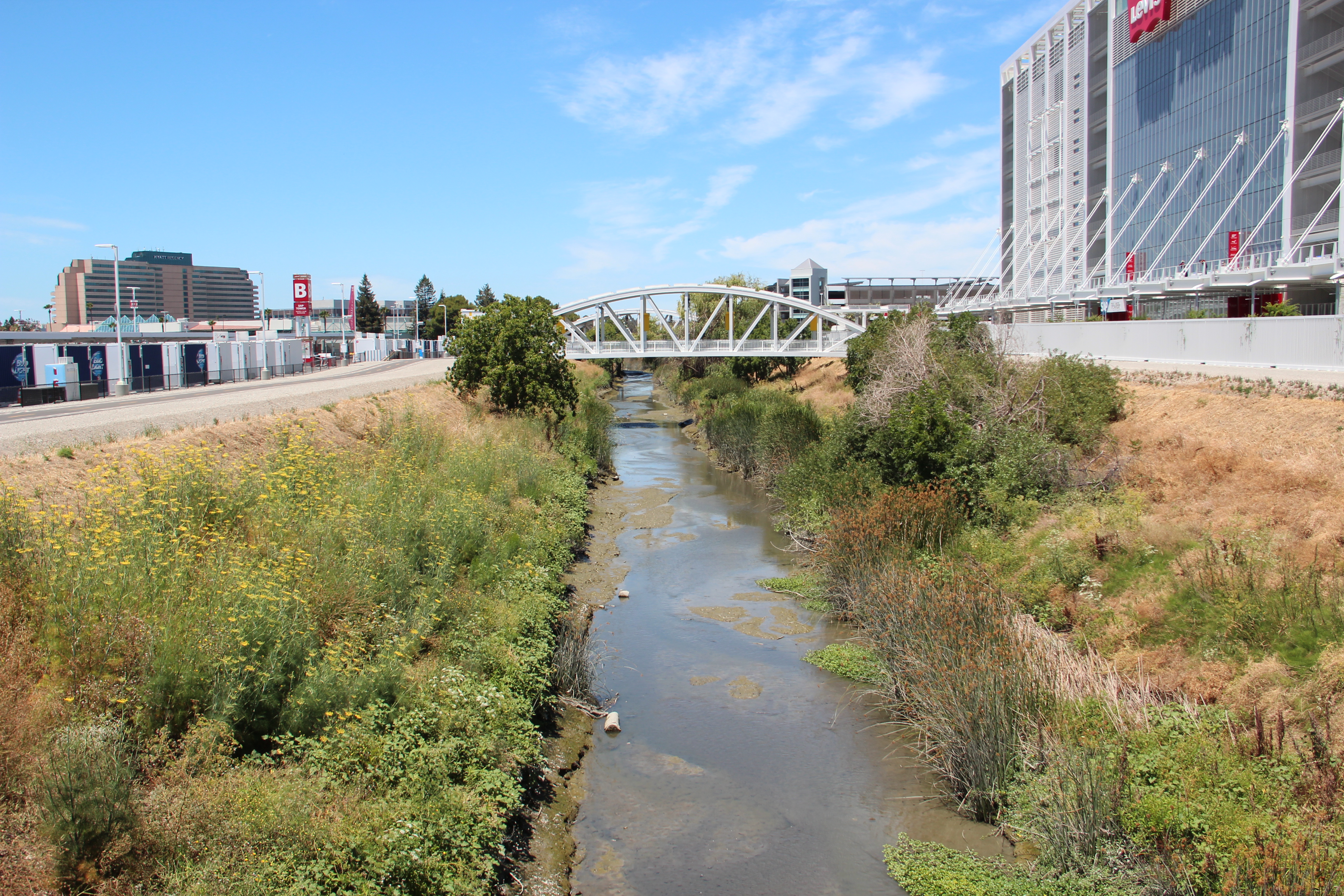
- San Tomas Aquino Creek in Santa Clara running alongside Levi's Stadium

- Location of the mouth of San Tomas Aquino Creek in Sunnyvale, California

Location
- Country: United States
- State: California
- Region: Santa Clara County
- Cities: Saratoga, Monte Sereno, Los Gatos, Campbell, Santa Clara, Alviso, San Jose, Sunnyvale

Physical characteristics
- Source: El Sereno Summit in the Santa Cruz Mountains
  - location: Saratoga, California
  - coordinates: 37°13′09″N 122°01′36″W
  - elevation: 2,337 ft (712 m)
- Mouth: Confluence with Saratoga Creek
  - location: Santa Clara, California
  - coordinates: 37°21′48″N 121°58′07″W
  - elevation: 38 ft (12 m)

Basin features
- Tributaries
  - left: Wildcat Creek
  - right: Mistletoe Creek, Smith Creek

San Tomas Aquinas Creek, known locally as San Tomas Aquino Creek, is a 13.6-mile-long (21.9 km) stream that heads on El Sereno mountain in El Sereno Open Space Preserve in Saratoga in Santa Clara County, California, United States. It flows north through the cities of Saratoga, Monte Sereno, Los Gatos, Campbell, and Santa Clara, where it joins Saratoga Creek, which in turn, flows to the Guadalupe Slough and south San Francisco Bay.

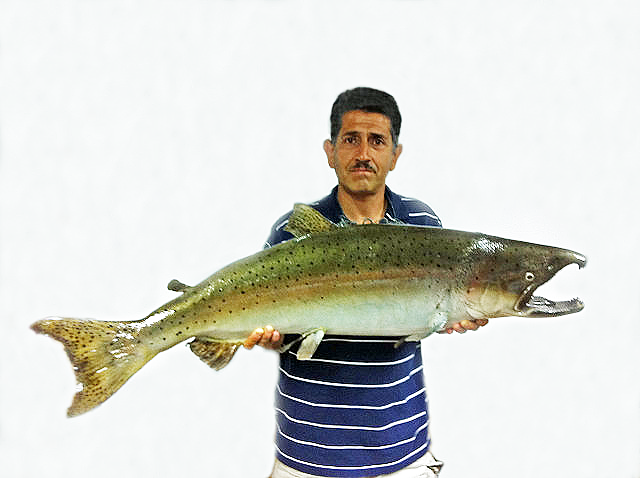
Roger Castillo, a founder of the Salmon and Steelhead Restoration Group, with a huge Chinook salmon (Oncorhynchus tshawytscha), now a taxidermy wall mount specimen, that he recovered from Saratoga Creek below Highway 237 in mid-October, 1996

== History ==
In the 1850s the creek appeared on several land grant maps as San Tomas Aquinas Creek and Arroyo de San Tomás Aquinas, named after Saint Thomas Aquinas. Historically, San Tomas Aquino Creek formed the eastern boundary of the 1841 Rancho Quito and the western boundary of the 1840 Rancho Rinconada de Los Gatos land grants.

== Watershed and course ==
The San Tomas Aquino Creek watershed drains about 45 square miles. It begins in the foothills of the Santa Cruz Mountains within the city of Saratoga and flows north through Campbell.

The middle portion of the creek runs under or alongside San Tomas Expressway. From Bucknall Road in Campbell, it runs along the west side of the expressway until Williams Road in West San Jose. From there, it runs under the median of the expressway until shortly north of Cabrillo Avenue in Santa Clara. Some portions are partially exposed, but much is completely underground. Just south of Monroe Avenue in Santa Clara, it joins Saratoga Creek.

The Guadalupe Slough carries the flows of San Thomas Aquino, Calabazas, and Saratoga Creeks out into south San Francisco Bay, passing just to the east of the Sunnyvale Water Pollution Control Ponds.

The San Tomas Aquino/Saratoga Creek Trail for bicycles and pedestrians follows the creek from Monroe Street in Santa Clara to the San Francisco Bay.

=== Tributaries ===
The major tributaries of San Tomas Aquino Creek include (heading downstream) Mistletoe, Wildcat (and its Vasona sub-tributary), and Smith.

Smith Creek is a headwaters tributary of San Tomas Aquino Creek, but is largely dry except during the winter months. It begins in the foothills of the Santa Cruz Mountains within the city of Monte Sereno, then flows northerly through portions of Los Gatos and Campbell until its confluence with San Tomas Aquino Creek.

San Tomas Aquino Creek flows into Saratoga Creek south of Highway 101, near Monroe Street in Santa Clara. Historically, San Tomas Aquino Creek was a tributary of Saratoga Creek and its water were carried directly to the Guadalupe River, but when the latter was redirected from Guadalupe Slough to Alviso Slough to facilitate navigation, Saratoga Creek, carrying waters from its San Tomas Aquino Creek tributary, was extended directly to Guadalupe Slough at Sunnyvale Baylands Park in Sunnyvale.

Vasona Creek is a short creek that runs through West Valley College and joins Wildcat Creek just before the latter reaches San Tomas Aquino Creek. With $570,000 in grants from the Santa Clara Valley Water District, the one mile section of Vasona Creek running through the college campus has undergone restoration since 2011, repairing deep channel incision and restoring riparian vegetation.

== Habitat and wildlife ==
In 1898 John Otterbein Snyder collected steelhead trout (then Salmo irideus Gibbons) specimens in Campbell Creek (now Saratoga Creek, a tributary of San Tomas Aquino Creek). A 1985 California Department of Fish and Game (CDFG) survey of Saratoga Creek noted "a major steelhead and king salmon spawning area" on San Tomas Aquino Creek located approximately 200 yards downstream of the Saratoga and San Tomas Aquino creeks confluence. Stream resident coastal rainbow trout (Oncorhynchus mykiss irideus) persist in the Saratoga Creek watershed but anadromous steelhead cannot run up from the Bay because of a barrier at the confluence of San Tomas Aquino Creek and Saratoga Creek that prevents their passage upstream. Recent genetic analysis has shown that the San Tomas Aquino watershed trout are of native origin and not hatchery stock.

Leidy (2007) identified the native fishes in San Tomas Aquino Creek as hitch (Lavinia exilicauda), California roach (Lavinia symmetricus), Sacramento sucker (Catostomus occidentalis occidentalis), three-spined stickleback (Gasterosteus aculeatus), steelhead trout (Oncohrynchus mykiss irideus) and possibly Chinook salmon (Oncorhynchus tshawytscha). Although the latter had been considered now absent from the watershed, in mid-October, 1996, Roger Castillo, the founder of the Salmon and Steelhead Restoration Group, recovered a giant Chinook salmon from San Tomas Aquino Creek beneath Highway 237 (see photo). Non-native fishes include common carp (Cyprinus carpio), goldfish (Carassius auratus auratus), golden shiner (Notemigonus crysoleucas), and Western mosquitofish (Gambusia affinis).

== See also ==
- List of watercourses in the San Francisco Bay Area
