= Santa Clara, California =

- City
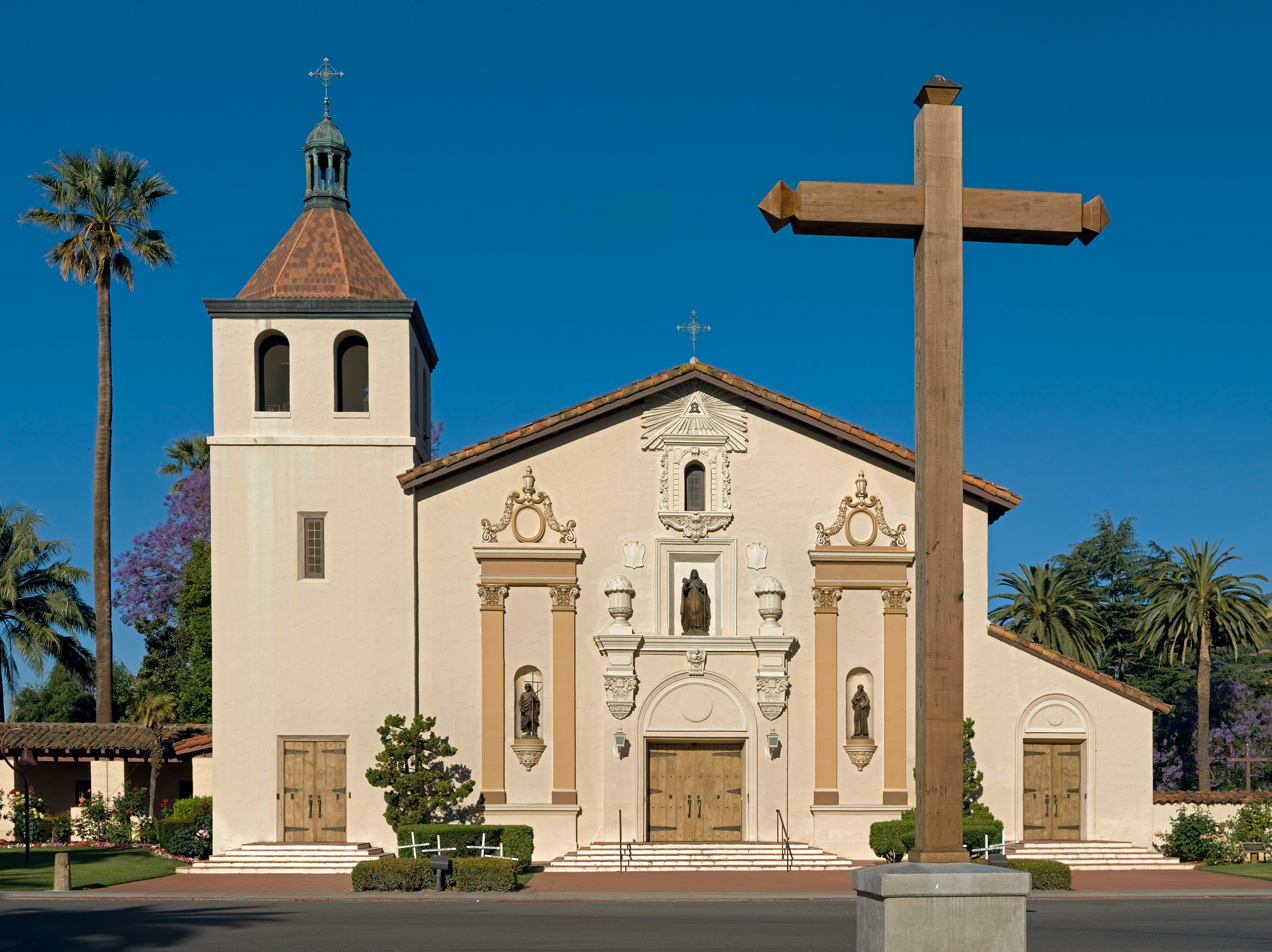
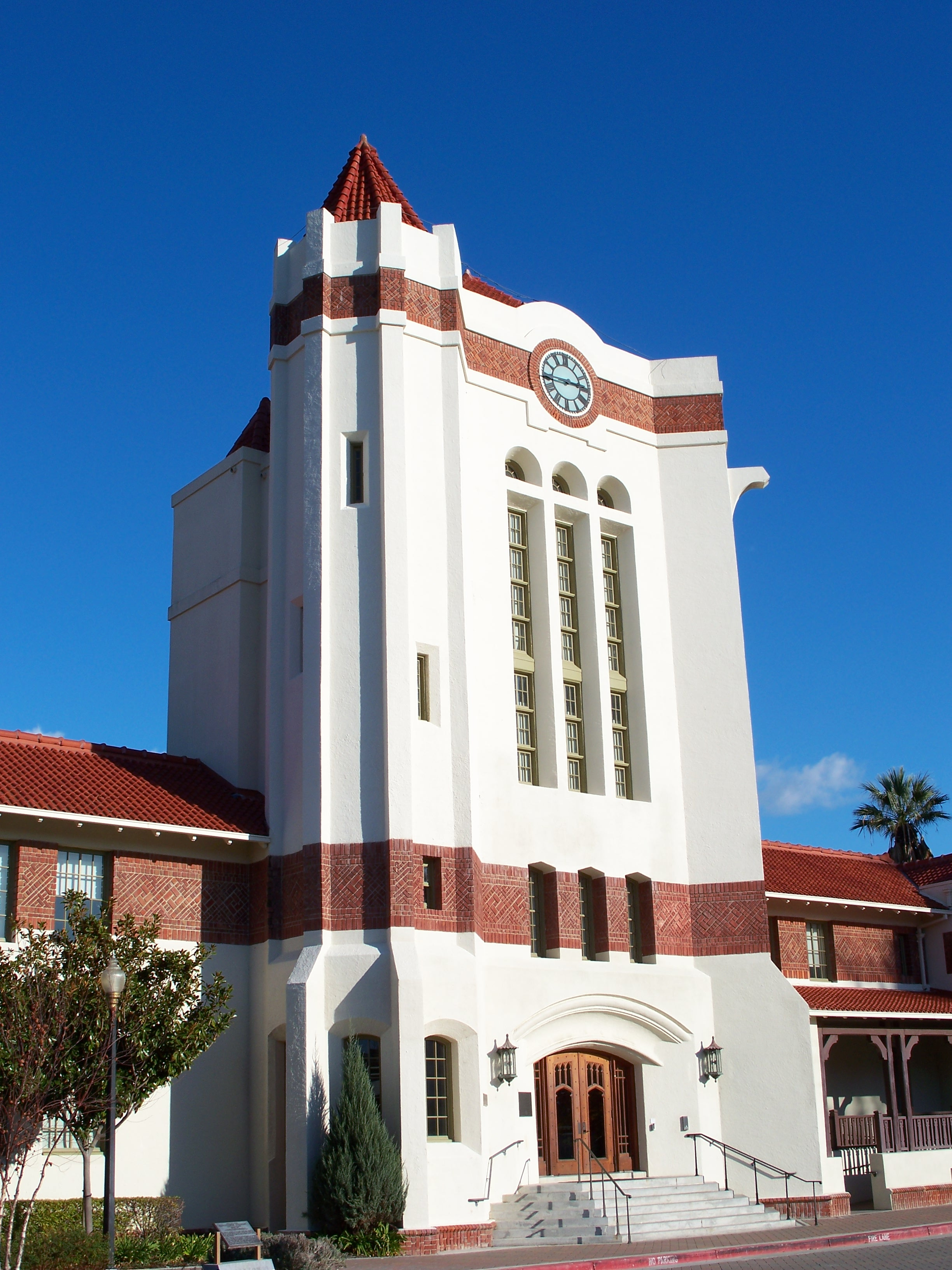
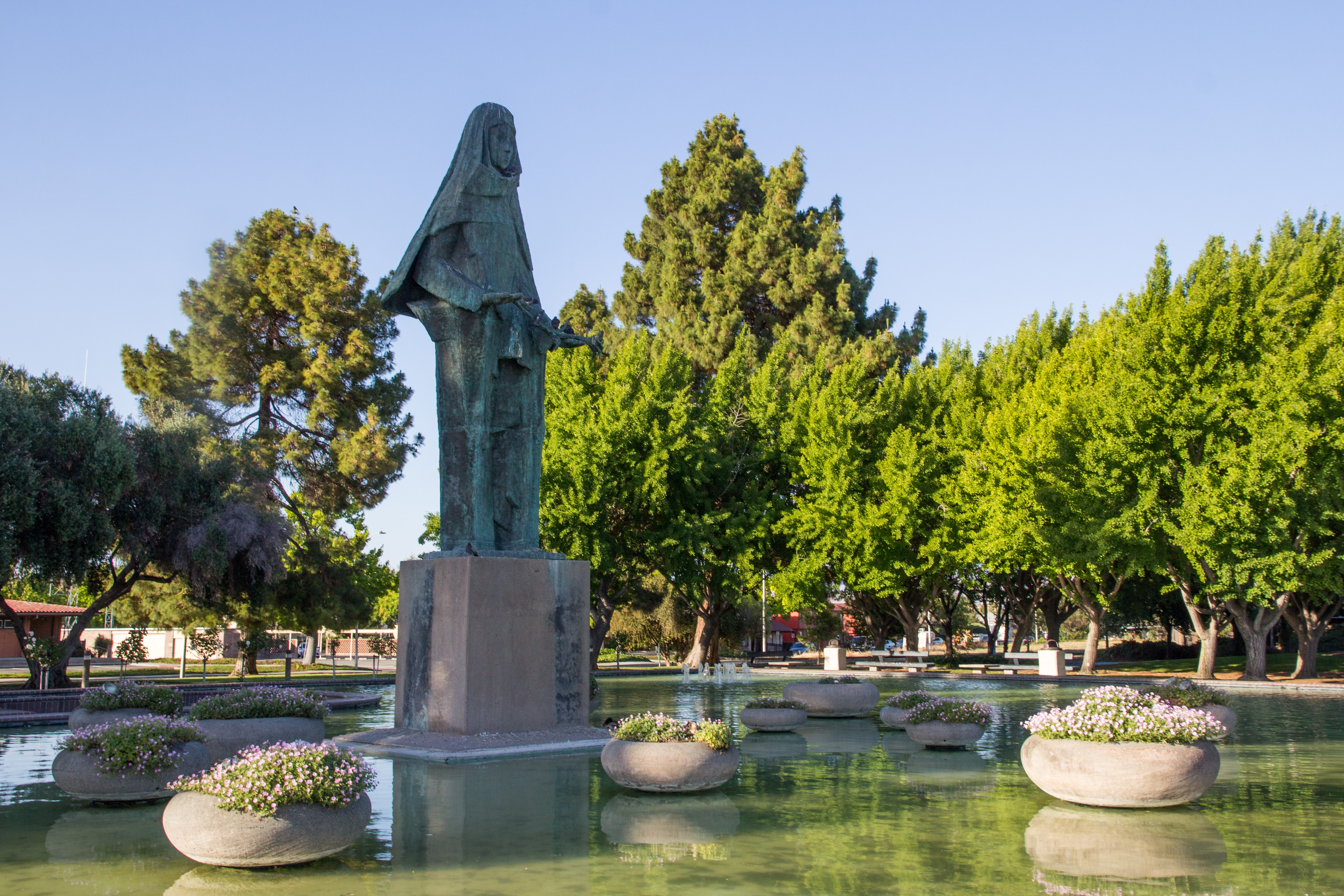
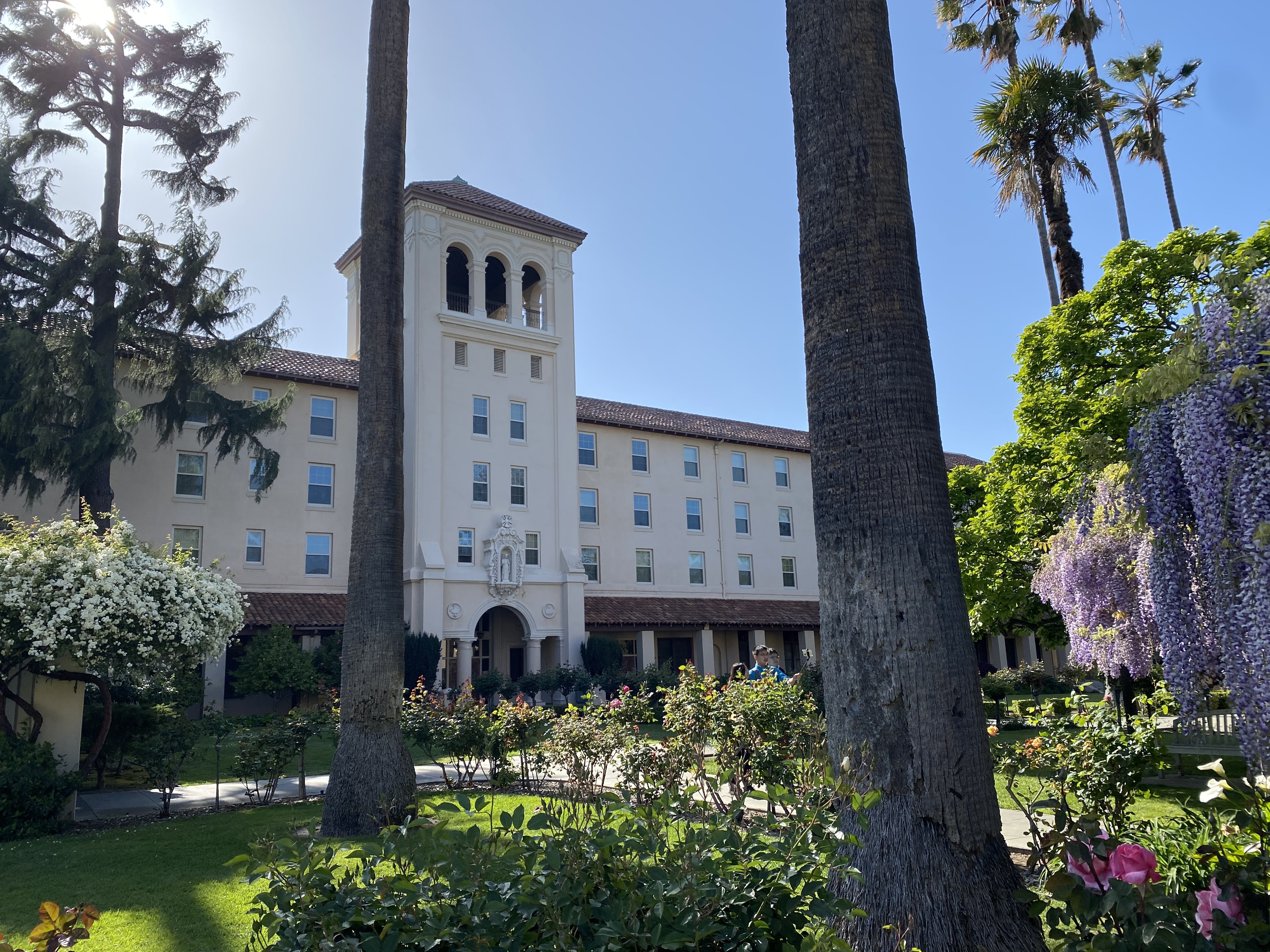
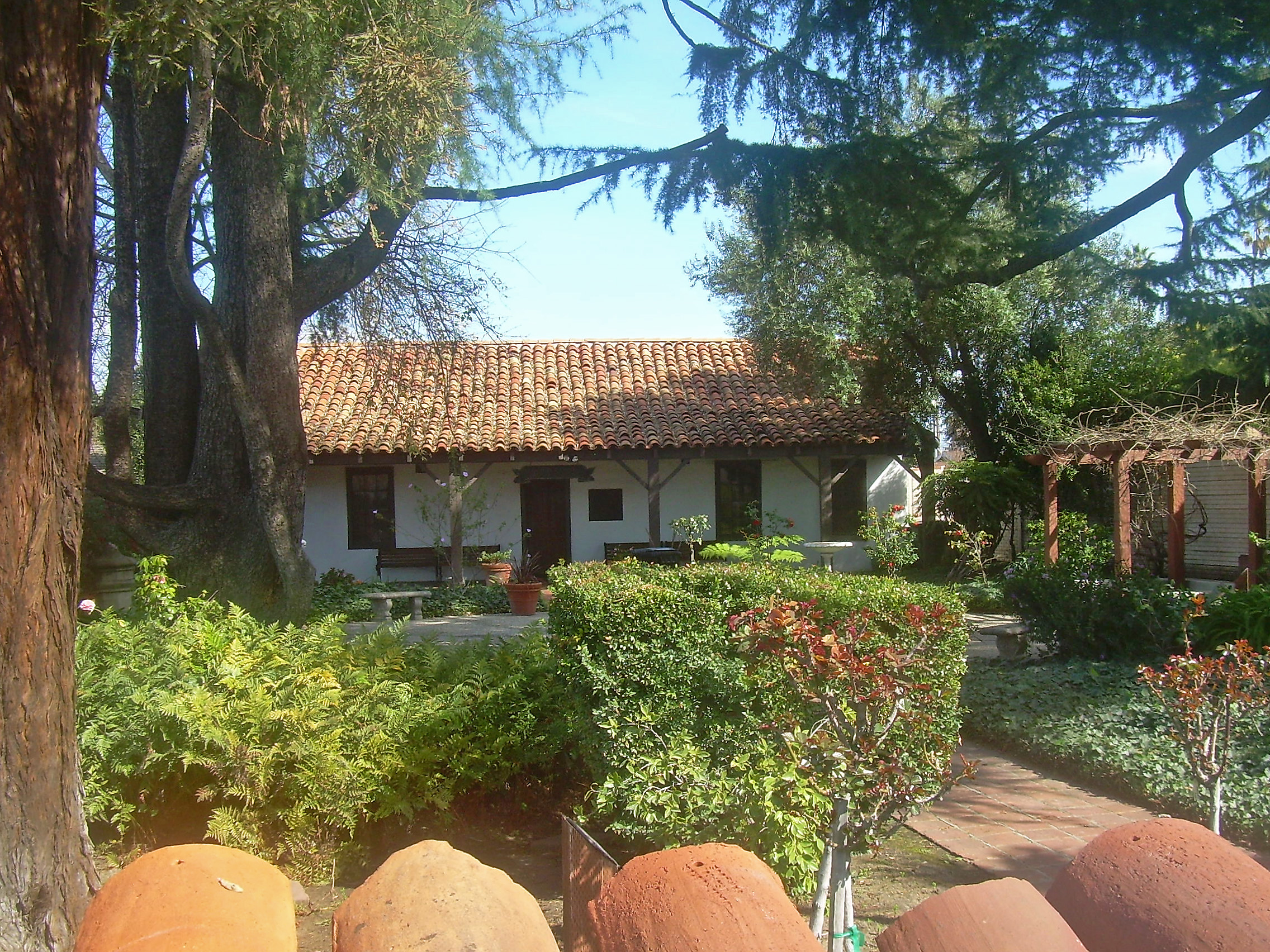
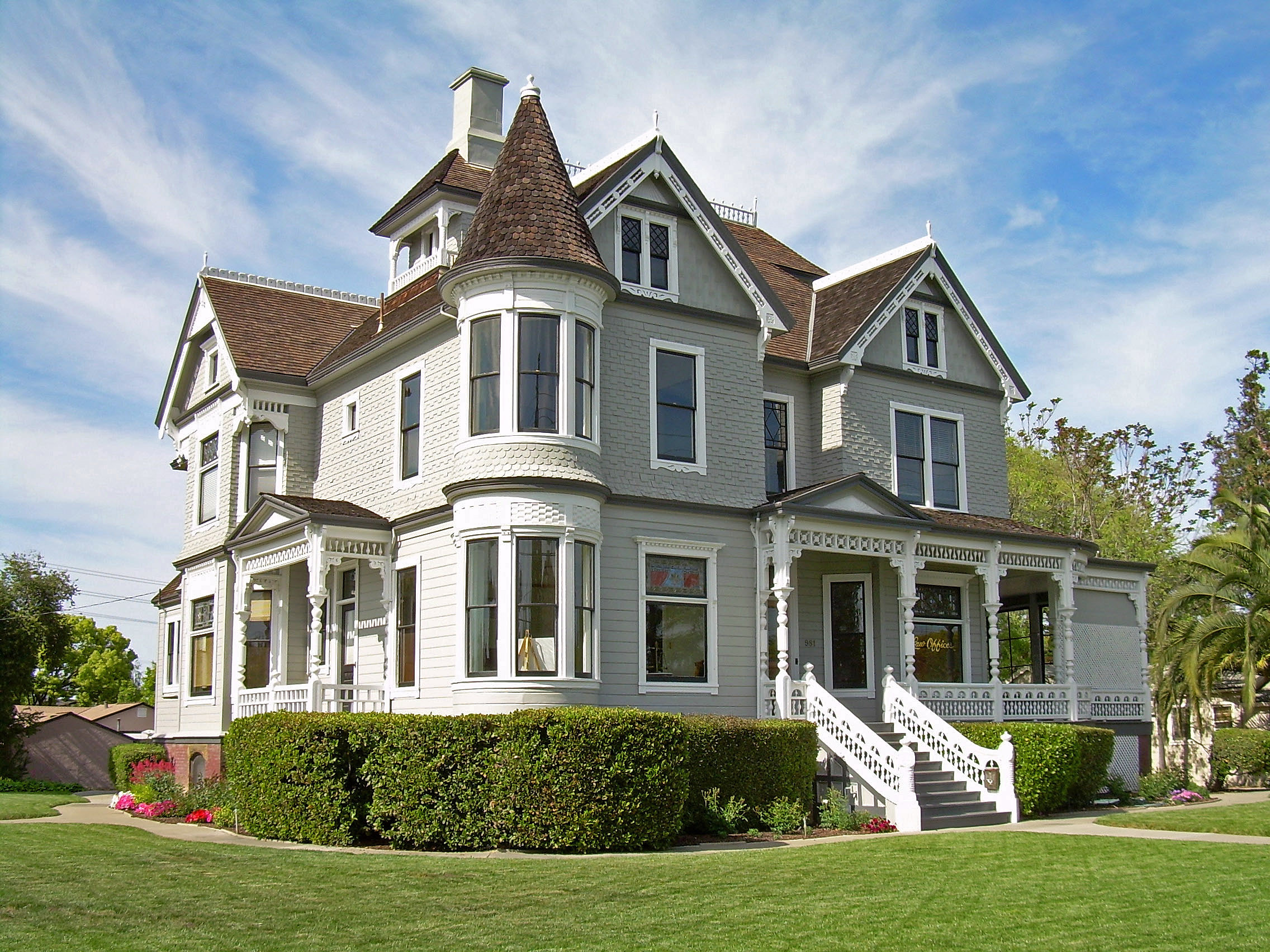
- Mission Santa Clara Agnews Developmental Center Saint Claire Monument Santa Clara University Women's Club Adobe Charles Copeland Morse House

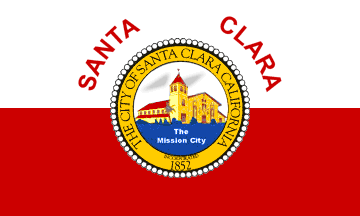
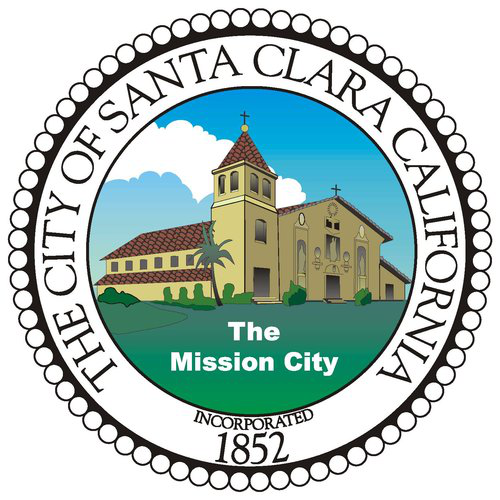
- Flag Seal
- Nickname: The Mission City
- Interactive map of Santa Clara, California
- Location of Santa Clara in the San Francisco Bay Area Location of Santa Clara in California Location of Santa Clara in the United States
- Coordinates: 37°21′16″N 121°58′9″W
- Country: United States
- State: California
- County: Santa Clara
- Incorporated: July 5, 1852
- Named for: Saint Clare of Assisi

Government
  - Type: Council–Manager
  - Mayor: Lisa Gillmor

Area
  - Total: 18.28 sq mi (47.34 km^{2})
  - Land: 18.28 sq mi (47.34 km^{2})
- Elevation: 72 ft (22 m)

Population (2020)
  - Total: 127,647
  - Rank: 3rd in Santa Clara County; 47th in California; 221st in the United States
  - Density: 6,984/sq mi (2,696.5/km^{2})
- Demonym: Santa Claran
- Time zone: UTC−8 (Pacific)
  - Summer (DST): UTC−7 (PDT)
- ZIP codes: 95050, 95051, 95054
- Area codes: 408/669
- FIPS code: 06-69084
- GNIS feature IDs: 1654953, 2411816
- Website: santaclaraca.gov

Santa Clara (/ˌsæntə ˈklærə/ SAN-tə KLAR-ə; Spanish for 'Saint Clare') is a city in Santa Clara County, California, United States. Located in the southern San Francisco Bay Area, it was founded by the Spanish in 1777 with the establishment of Mission Santa Clara de Asís under the leadership of Junípero Serra. The city's population was 127,647 at the 2020 census, making it the eighth-most populous city in the Bay Area. The U.S. Census Bureau estimated Santa Clara's population at 133,446 as of July 1, 2025.

Santa Clara is located in the center of Silicon Valley and is home to the headquarters of companies such as Intel, Advanced Micro Devices (AMD), and Nvidia. It is also home to Santa Clara University, the oldest university in California, Levi's Stadium, home of the National Football League's San Francisco 49ers, and California's Great America amusement park. Santa Clara is bordered by San Jose on almost every side, except for Sunnyvale and Cupertino to the west.

== History ==
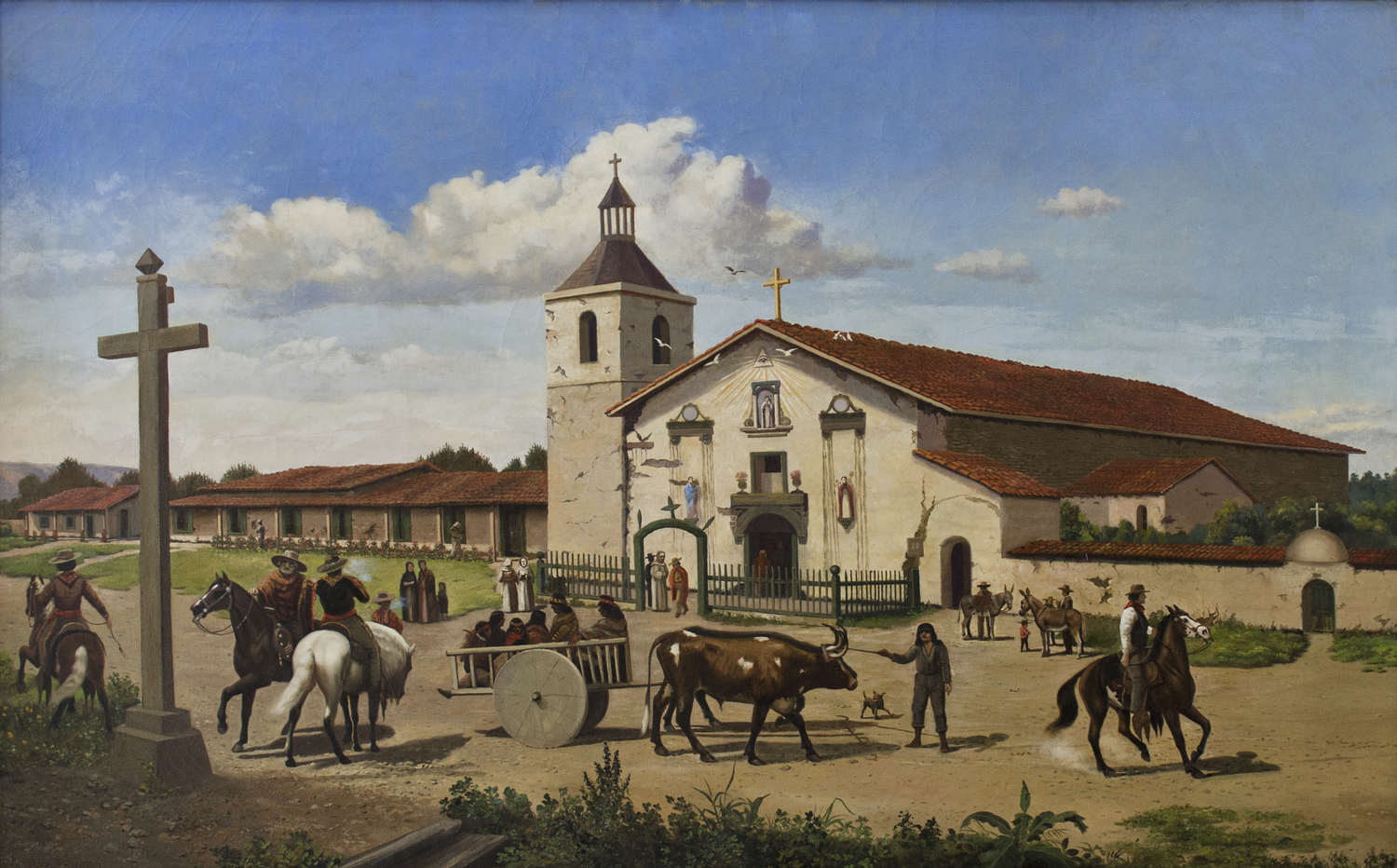
Mission Santa Clara de Asís was founded by the Spanish in 1777.

Prior to the arrival of Europeans in the 18th century, the Tamien tribe of the Ohlone nation of Indigenous Californians had inhabited the area for several millennia.

=== Spanish period ===
The first European to visit the valley was José Francisco Ortega in 1769. The Spanish began to colonize California with 21 missions, and the Mission Santa Clara de Asís was founded in 1777.

=== Mexican period ===
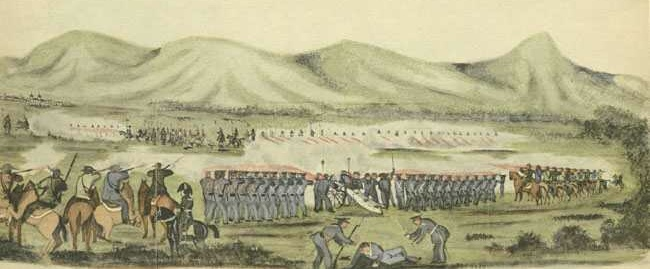
The 1847 Battle of Santa Clara, fought between the Americans and the Californios, was one of the last battles of the U.S. Conquest of California.

The Battle of Santa Clara, one of the last battles of the Conquest of California, was fought between a contingent of Californios, led by Francisco Sánchez, against the invading American forces.

=== American period ===
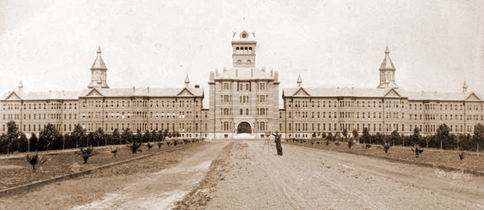
Agnews Insane Asylum in 1910

In 1851, Santa Clara College was established on the grounds of the original Mission. In 1852, Santa Clara was incorporated as a town; it became state-chartered by 1862.

For the next century, the economy centered on agriculture since orchards and vegetables were thriving in the fertile soil. By the beginning of the 20th century, the population had reached 5,000 and stayed about the same for many years.

In 1905, the first public high-altitude flights by humans were made over Santa Clara in gliders designed by John J. Montgomery. The semiconductor industry, which sprouted around 1960, changed the city and surrounding Valley of Heart's Delight; little of its agricultural past remains.

Santa Clara's first medical hospital was built in 1963. This structure, on Kiely Boulevard, was replaced in 2007 with a new Kaiser Permanente medical center located on Lawrence Expressway at Homestead Road.

Santa Clara was also home to a major mental health facility, Agnews State Hospital. According to the National Park Service, more than 100 persons were killed at this site in the 1906 earthquake. The site is the former home to Sun Microsystems and is listed in the National Register of Historic Places.

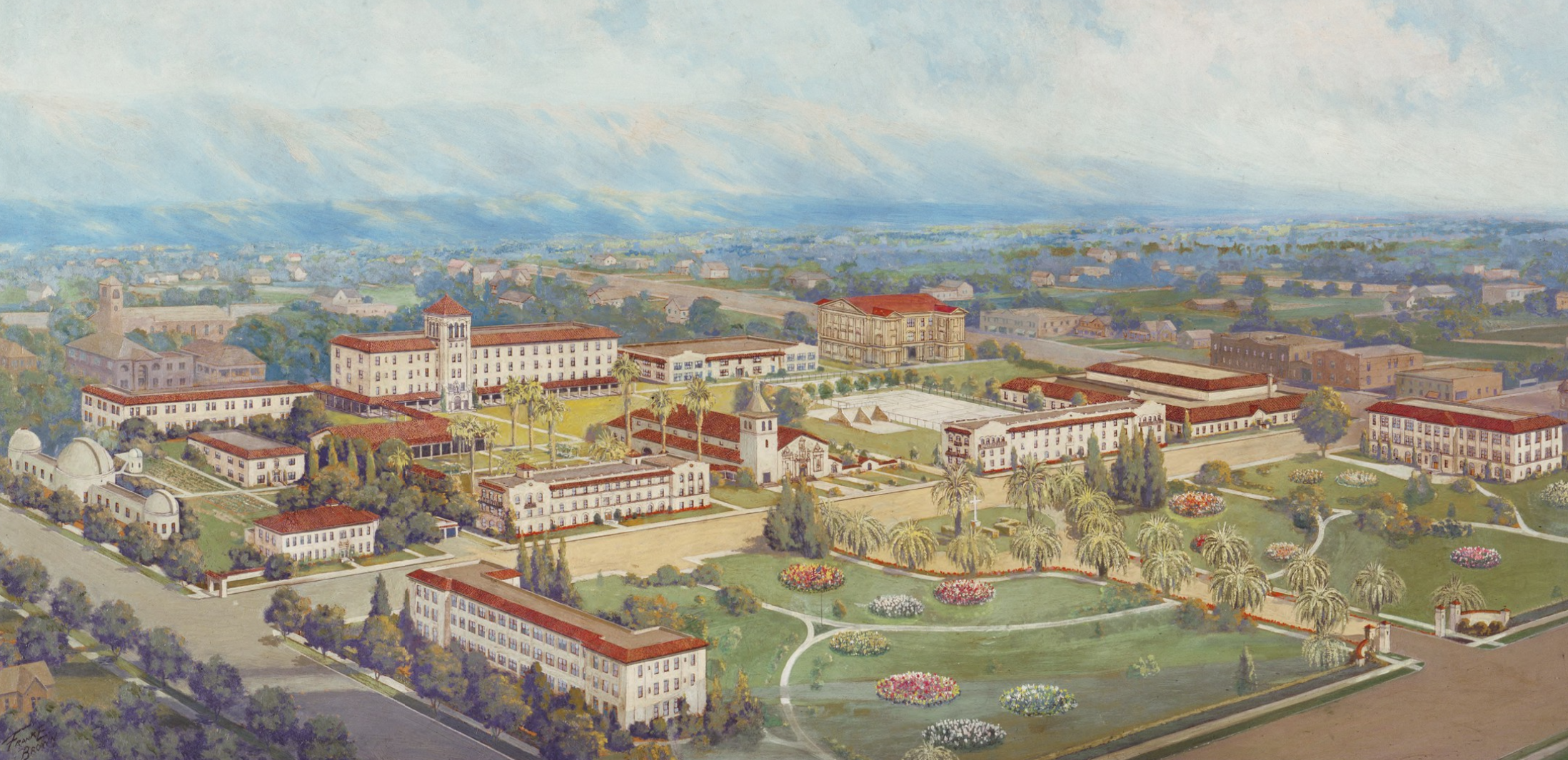
Santa Clara University in 1933

Urban renewal policies of the 1950s and 1970s further accelerated downtown Santa Clara's decline. In 1957, the city filed an application for federal urban renewal funds under the 1954 Housing Act, proposing what was called the "Franklin Facelift"—a plan to rehabilitate the downtown business district and reverse perceived blight. Initially framed as a preservation effort, the plan evolved into a sweeping redevelopment proposal that included demolition of historic buildings and reconfiguration of the street grid.

In September 1961, the city council voted to knock down the eight-block grid of Downtown Santa Clara, in order to receive federal funding for urban renewal. Following the 1961 city council vote, a group of citizens filed lawsuit and challenged the scope of demolition and use of federal funds. The court limited redevelopment to original "facelift" funding, constraining broader plans. The city cleared the land but failed to rebuild the downtown, contributing to a decades-long vacuum. In 1965, the demolition of the eight-block grid (between Benton, Lafayette, Madison, and Homestead) was completed. Historic buildings like the City Hall, Franck Building and Santa Clara Theater were razed. Only the two-block Franklin Mall was built to replace the demolished buildings; however, most businesses did not return to the area due to high land costs. Again in 1969, urban renewal continued with the Mission Revitalization Project, which demolished more homes in the area.

In June 2016, a grassroots movement to rebuild Santa Clara's historic downtown was formed, called Reclaiming Our Downtown.

== Geography ==
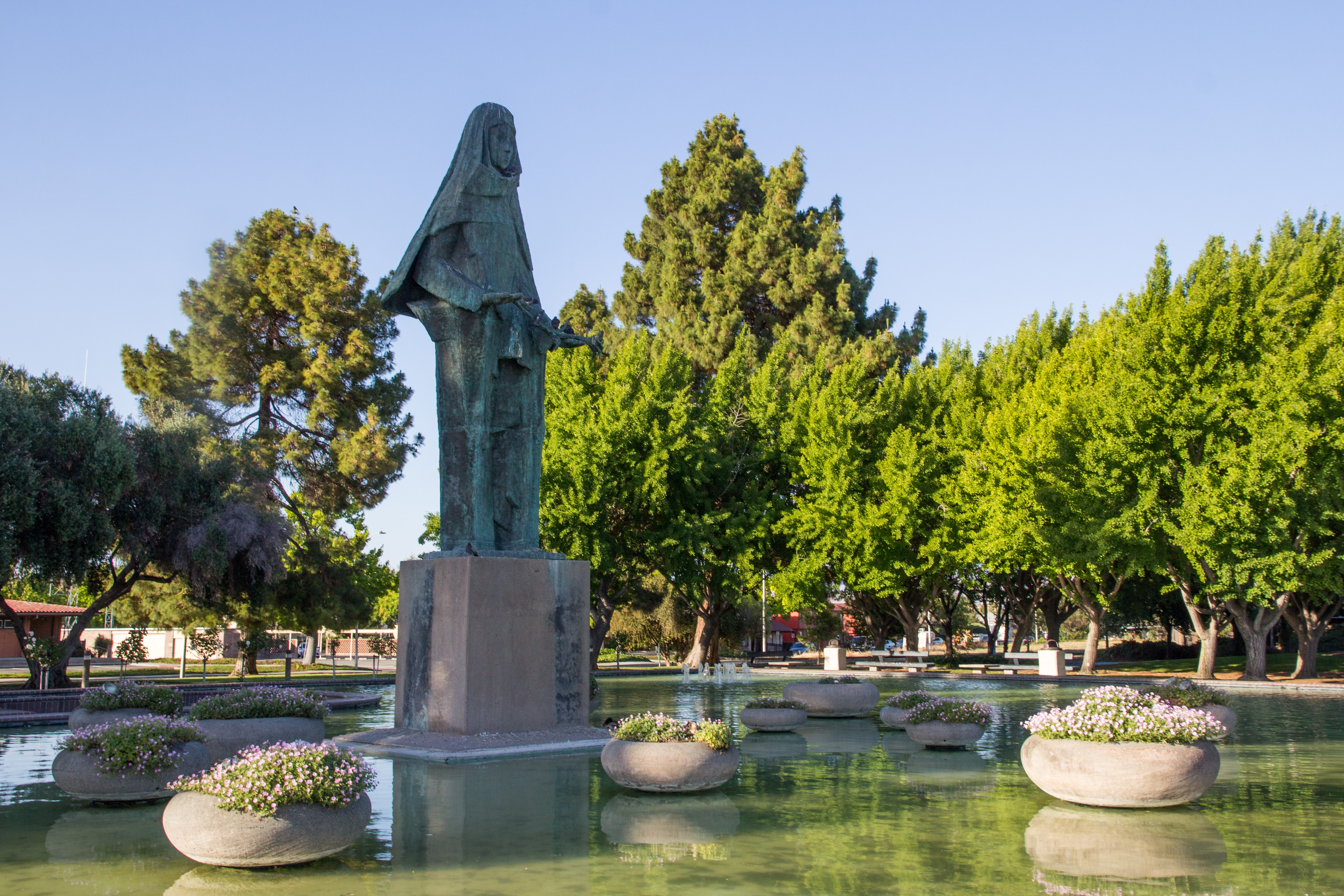
Statue of Santa Clara de Asís in Civic Center Park

Santa Clara is drained by three seasonal creeks, all of which empty into the southern portion of San Francisco Bay; these creeks are San Tomas Aquino Creek, Saratoga Creek, and Calabazas Creek.

There are some significant biological resources within the city, including habitat for the burrowing owl, a species of special concern in California due to habitat reduction from urban development during the latter 20th century. This owl uses burrows created by ground squirrels and prefers generally level grasslands and even disturbed areas. Coyotes have also become active in the area as of 2019.

According to the U.S. Census Bureau, the city covers an area of 18.4 square miles (48 km^{2}), all land.

=== Climate ===
The average daily temperatures in July range from 82 °F (28 °C) to 53 °F (12 °C). Winters are mild, with the mean daily temperatures in January ranging from 58 °F (14 °C) to 38 °F (3 °C). Most of the annual rainfall comes in the winter months; the summer months are generally rainless.

Climate data for Santa Clara, California (Santa Clara University, 1893–1976)
Month	Jan	Feb	Mar	Apr	May	Jun	Jul	Aug	Sep	Oct	Nov	Dec	Year
Mean daily maximum °F (°C)	58 (14)	62 (17)	66 (19)	70 (21)	74 (23)	79 (26)	82 (28)	82 (28)	81 (27)	76 (24)	67 (19)	59 (15)	71 (22)
Mean daily minimum °F (°C)	38 (3)	41 (5)	42 (6)	44 (7)	47 (8)	50 (10)	53 (12)	52 (11)	51 (11)	47 (8)	42 (6)	39 (4)	46 (8)
Average precipitation inches (mm)	3.03 (77)	2.56 (65)	2.30 (58)	1.03 (26)	.40 (10)	.09 (2.3)	.01 (0.25)	.04 (1.0)	.27 (6.9)	.63 (16)	1.47 (37)	2.66 (68)	14.49 (367.45)
Average precipitation days (≥ .01 in)	10	9	9	5	3	1	0	0	1	3	6	9	56
Source: Western Regional Climate Center

== Demographics ==
Historical population
Census	Pop.	Note	%±
1880	2,416		—
1890	2,891		19.7%
1900	3,650		26.3%
1910	4,348		19.1%
1920	5,220		20.1%
1930	6,302		20.7%
1940	6,650		5.5%
1950	11,702		76.0%
1960	58,880		403.2%
1970	86,118		46.3%
1980	87,700		1.8%
1990	93,613		6.7%
2000	102,361		9.3%
2010	116,468		13.8%
2020	127,647		9.6%
U.S. Decennial Census

=== Racial and ethnic composition ===
Santa Clara city, California – Racial and ethnic composition The US Census treats Hispanic/Latino as an ethnic category. This table excludes Latinos from the racial categories and assigns them to a separate category. Hispanics/Latinos may be of any race.
Race / ethnicity (NH = Non-Hispanic)	Pop 2000	Pop 2010	Pop 2020	% 2000	% 2010	% 2020
White alone (NH)	49,392	42,026	35,930	48.25%	36.08%	28.15%
Black or African American alone (NH)	2,237	2,929	2,713	2.19%	2.51%	2.13%
Native American or Alaska Native alone (NH)	275	240	186	0.27%	0.21%	0.15%
Asian alone (NH)	29,791	43,531	59,678	29.10%	37.38%	46.75%
Native Hawaiian or Pacific Islander alone (NH)	416	604	390	0.41%	0.52%	0.31%
Other race alone (NH)	275	321	797	0.27%	0.28%	0.62%
Mixed race or Multiracial (NH)	3,611	4,228	5,403	3.63%	3.63%	4.23%
Hispanic or Latino (any race)	16,364	22,589	22,550	15.99%	19.40%	17.67%
Total	102,361	116,468	127,647	100.00%	100.00%	100.00%

=== 2010 ===
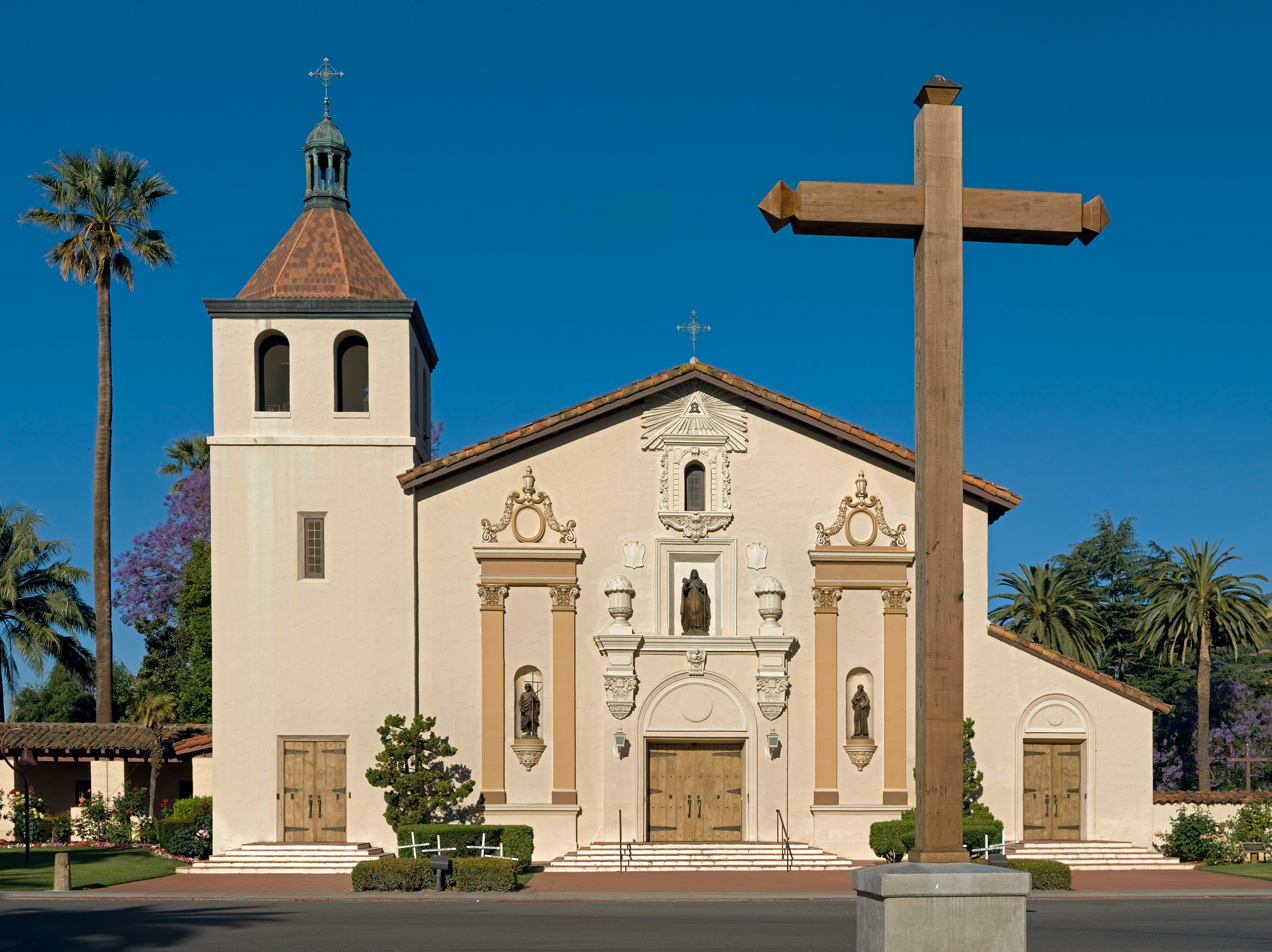
Mission Santa Clara de Asís

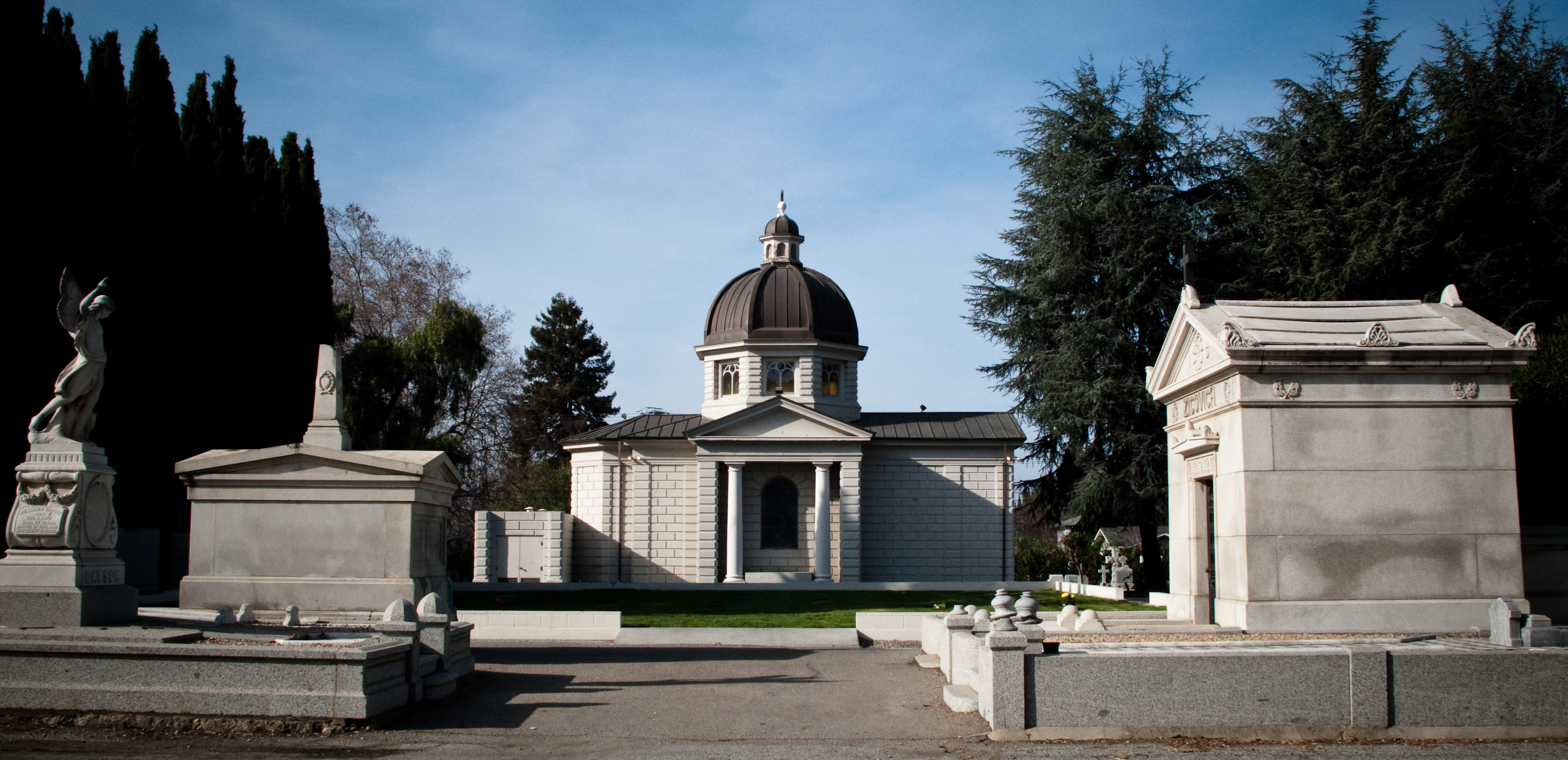
Mausoleums at Mission Cemetery

The 2010 United States census reported that Santa Clara had a population of 116,468. The population density was 6,327.3 inhabitants per square mile (2,443.0/km^{2}). The ethnic makeup of Santa Clara was 52,359 (45.0%) White, 3,154 (2.7%) African American, 579 (0.5%) Native American, 43,889 (37.7%) Asian (13.6% Indian, 6.9% Chinese, 6.2% Filipino, 3.9% Vietnamese, 3.0% Korean, 1.5% Japanese), 651 (0.6%) Pacific Islander, 9,624 (8.3%) from other races, and 6,212 (5.3%) from two or more races. There were 22,598 people (19.4%) who identified as Hispanic or Latino; 14.6% of Santa Clara's population was of Mexican ancestry.

The Census reported that 113,272 people (97.3% of the population) lived in households, 2,860 (2.5%) lived in non-institutionalized group quarters, and 336 (0.3%) were institutionalized.

There were 43,021 households, out of which 14,477 (33.7%) had children under the age of 18 living in them, 21,817 (50.7%) were opposite-sex married couples living together, 4,081 (9.5%) had a female householder with no husband present, 2,038 (4.7%) had a male householder with no wife present. There were 2,146 (5.0%) unmarried opposite-sex partnerships, and 312 (0.7%) same-sex married couples or partnerships. 10,906 households (25.4%) were made up of individuals, and 2,945 (6.8%) had someone living alone who was 65 years of age or older. The average household size was 2.63. There were 27,936 families (64.9% of all households); the average family size was 3.18.

The age distribution of the population was as follows: 24,774 people (21.3%) were under the age of 18, 12,511 people (10.7%) aged 18 to 24, 41,876 people (36.0%) aged 25 to 44, 25,628 people (22.0%) aged 45 to 64, and 11,679 people (10.0%) who were 65 years of age or older. The median age was 34.1 years. For every 100 females, there were 102.0 males. For every 100 females age 18 and over, there were 100.9 males.

There were 45,147 housing units at an average density of 2,452.7 units per square mile (947.0 units/km^{2}), of which 19,747 (45.9%) were owner-occupied, and 23,274 (54.1%) were occupied by renters. The homeowner vacancy rate was 1.3%; the rental vacancy rate was 4.6%. 53,694 people (46.1% of the population) lived in owner-occupied housing units and 59,578 people (51.2%) lived in rental housing units.

== Economy ==
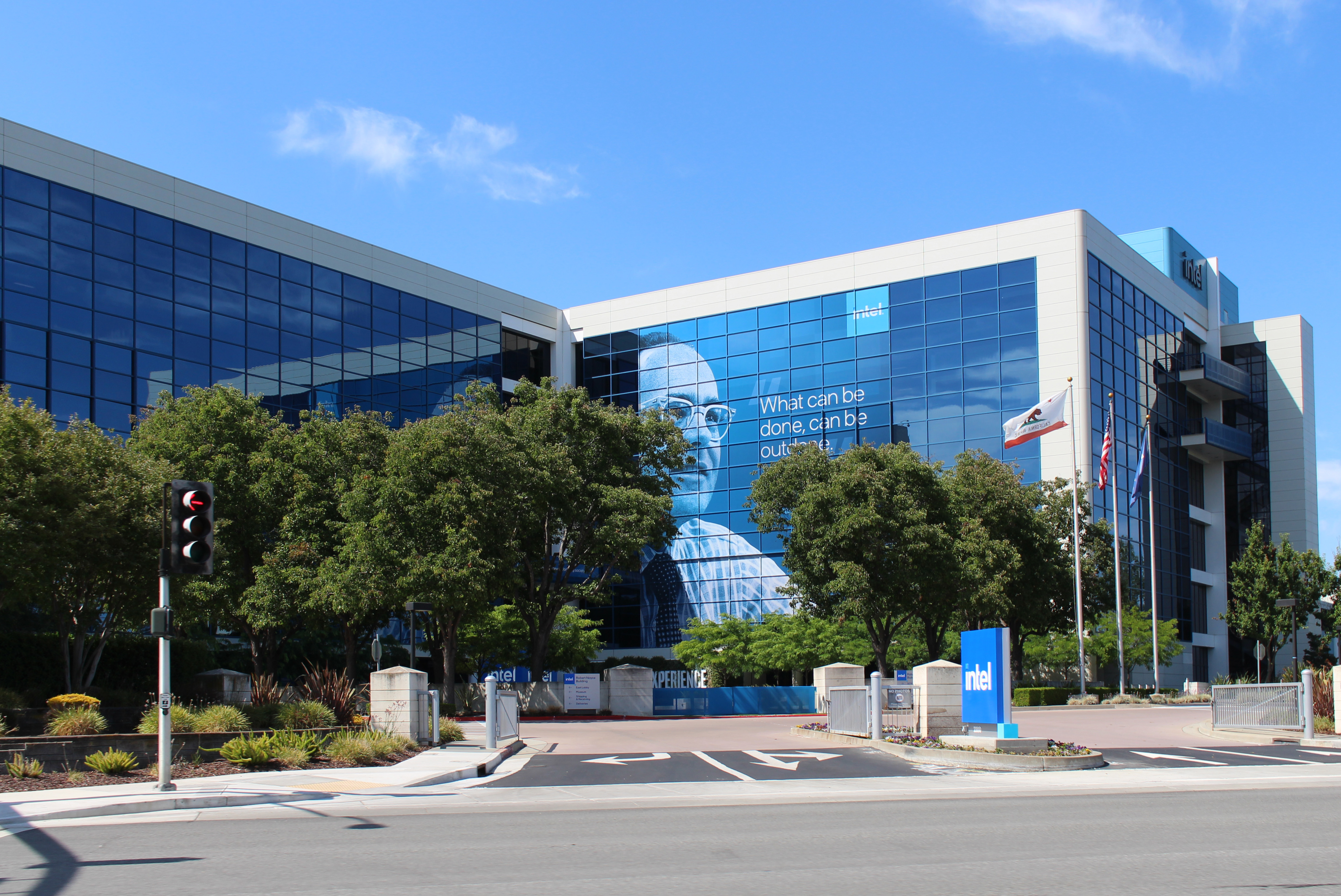
Intel headquarters

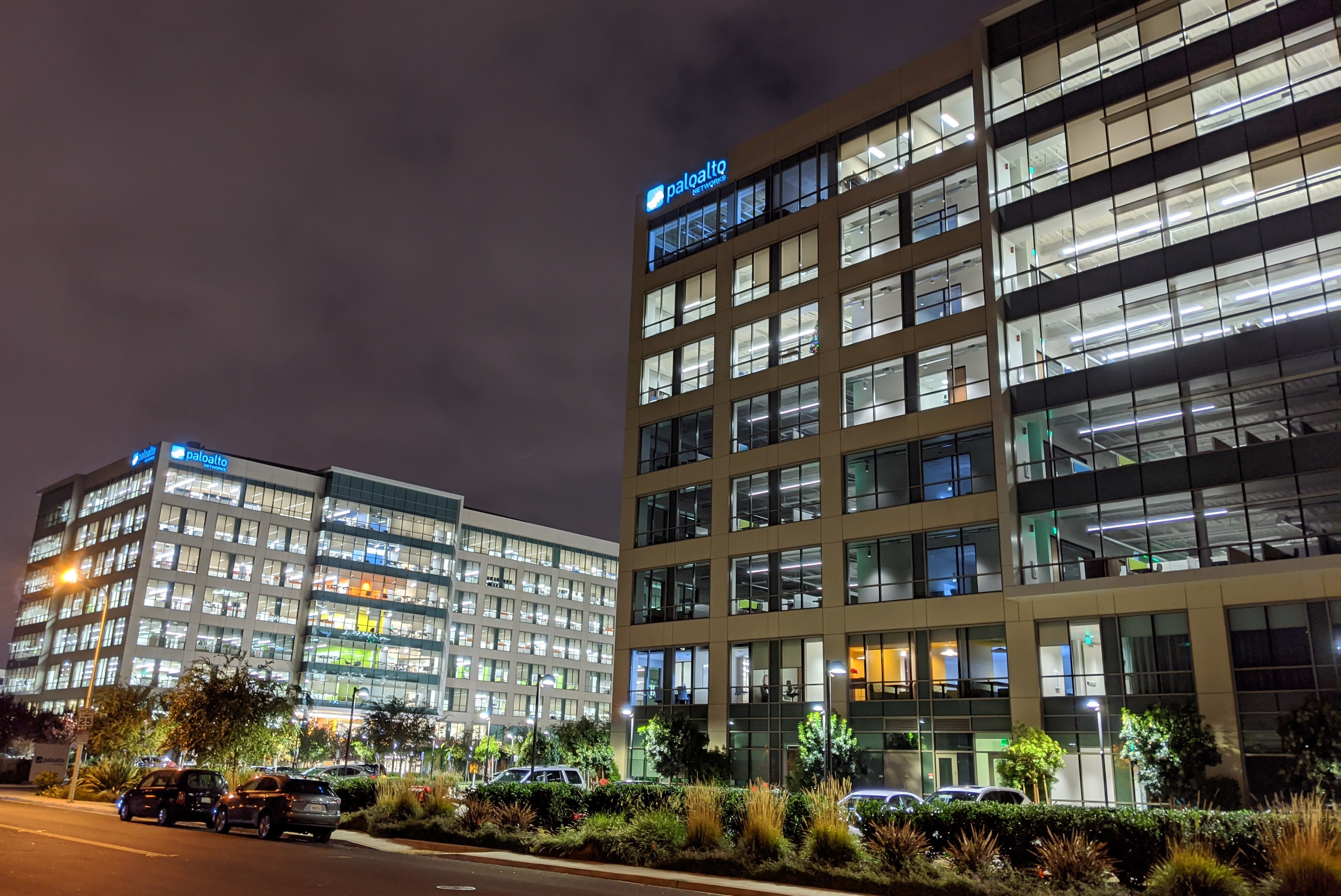
Palo Alto Networks headquarters

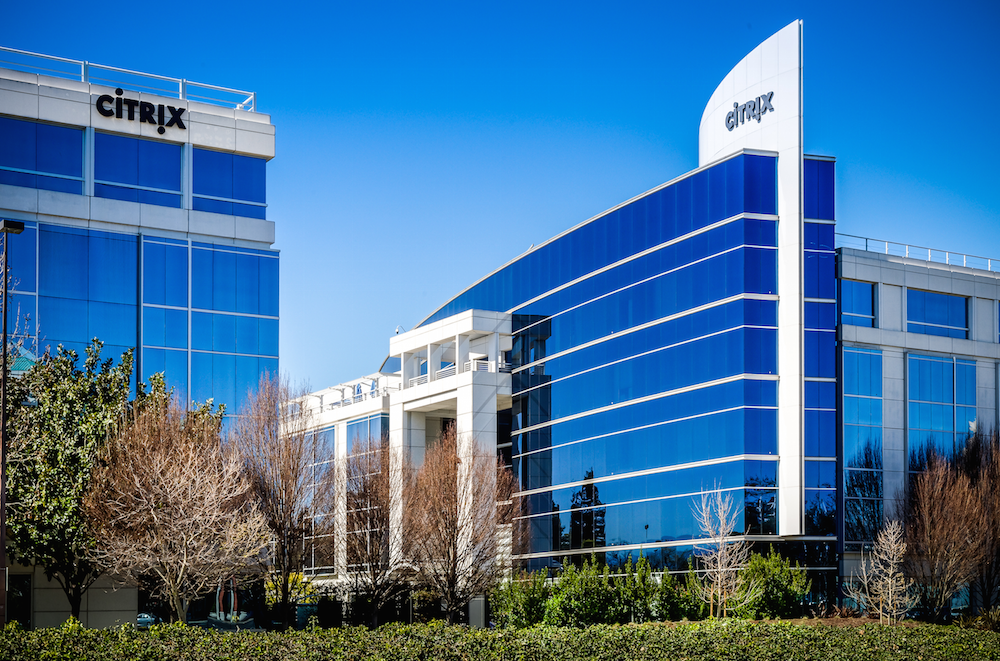
Citrix Systems headquarters

The City of Santa Clara owns and operates the Silicon Valley Power electric utility. In 2005, Silicon Valley Power brought online the Donald Von Raesfeld (DVR) Power Plant. The new combined cycle gas turbine plant produces 147 megawatts of electricity for the city and its residents. As a result, the going rate for electricity in Santa Clara is considerably less than that offered by Northern California's dominant utility, Pacific Gas and Electric. In 2025, Silicon Valley Power announced a 5% increase in rates for all users to fund "infrastructure projects", which some suspect are data centers.

Santa Clara is California's leader in data center operation, with more than 50 server farms, which use 60% of the energy from municipal utilities.

Advanced Micro Devices (AMD), Affymetrix, Agilent Technologies, Applied Materials, Arista Networks, Aruba, Brillio, Chegg, Claris, Cloudera, Coherent, Infoblox, Intel, Intevac, Malwarebytes, Marvell Technology Group, Nvidia, OmniVision Technologies, Palo Alto Networks, ServiceNow, Silicon Valley Bank, and Veritas Technologies are among the companies headquartered in Santa Clara. The North American office of Bandai Namco Entertainment (formerly Namco) was in Santa Clara until its consolidation with its existing offices in Irvine, California.

=== Top employers ===
According to the city's 2024 Annual Comprehensive Financial Report, the top employers in the city are:

Rank	Employer	No. of employees
1	Applied Materials	8,500
2	Intel	7,801
3	AMD	3,000
4	Kaiser Foundation Health Plan	2,600
5	Nvidia	2,500
6	California's Great America	2,500
7	Dell	2,088
8	Santa Clara University	2,000
9	City of Santa Clara	1,704
10	Macy's	1,200

== Government ==
The mayor of Santa Clara is Lisa M. Gillmor. Its city councilmembers are: Albert Gonzalez (District 1), Raj Chahal (District 2), Karen Hardy (District 3), Kevin Park (District 4), Suds Jain (District 5), and Kelly G. Cox (District 6). Santa Clara is represented in California's 17th congressional district for the U.S. House of Representatives, currently represented by Ro Khanna (D).

In the California Legislature, Santa Clara is part of California's 10th State Senate district and California's 26th State Assembly district, represented in the Senate by Vacant and in the Assembly by Patrick Ahrens (D).

The city operates the Santa Clara City Library, which is not part of the Santa Clara County Library District.

== Education ==
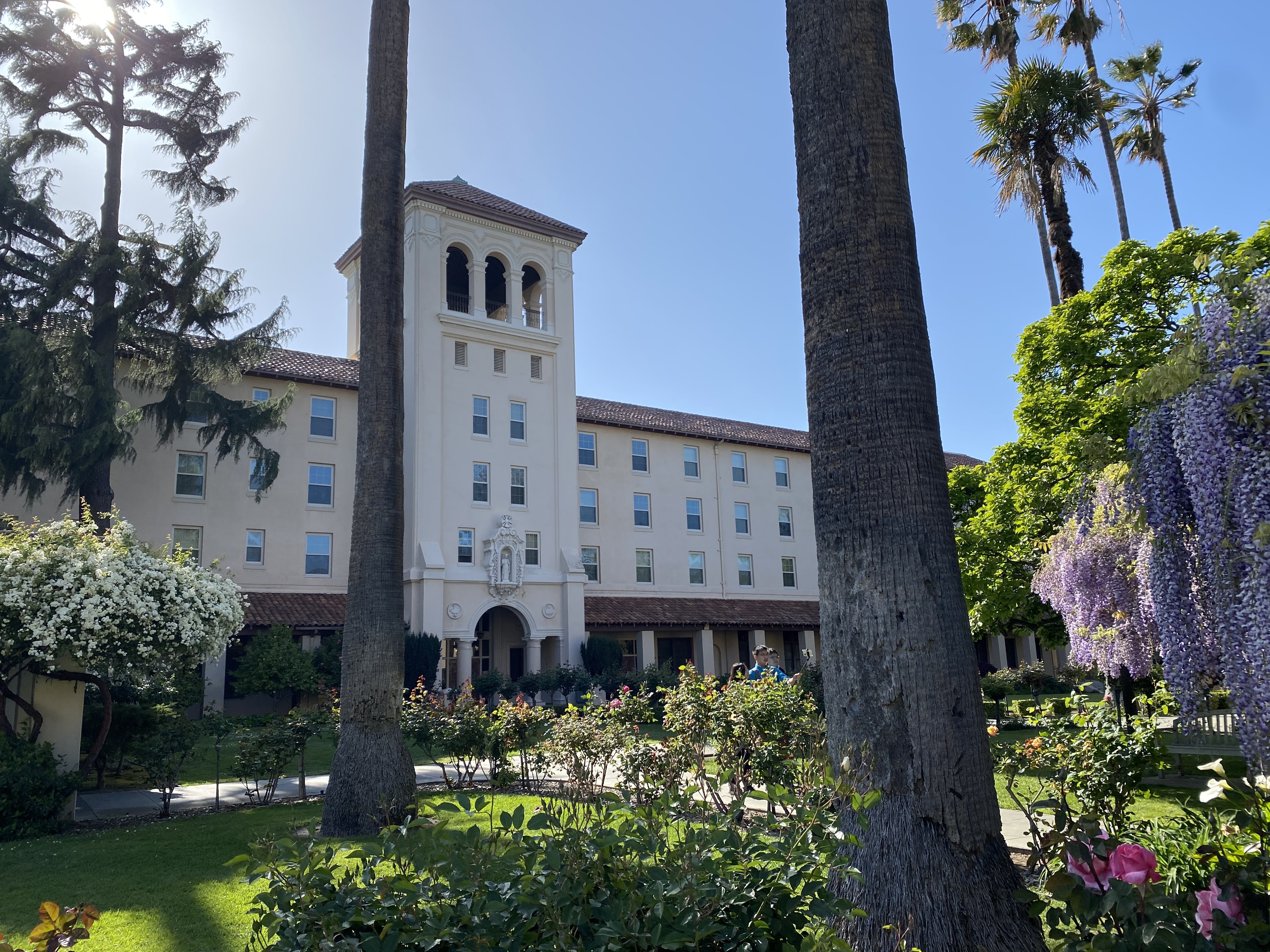
Santa Clara University, the oldest university in California

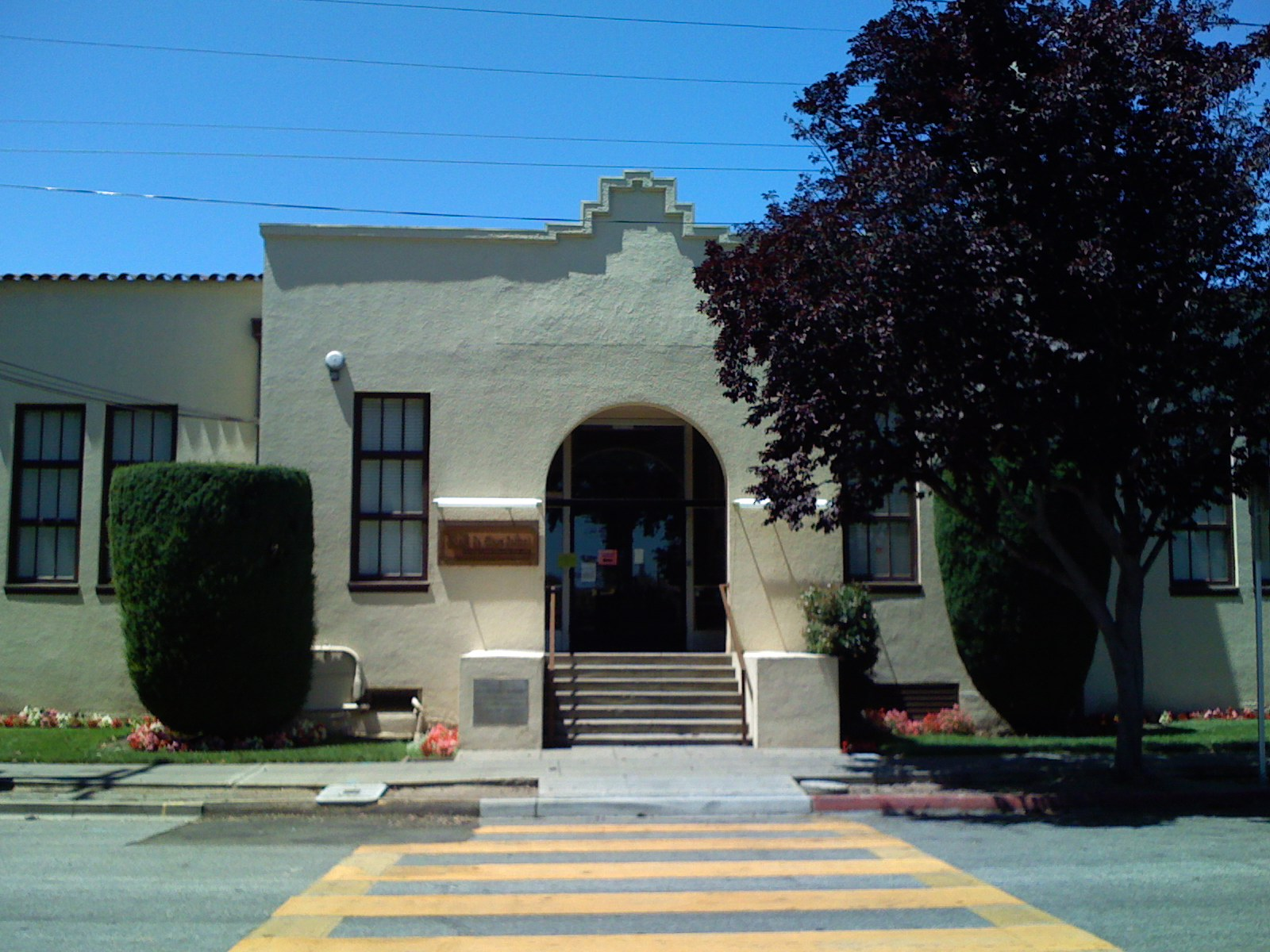
Saint Clare School, the oldest private elementary school in California

Santa Clara Unified School District is the public school district that includes the vast majority of Santa Clara and small portions of Sunnyvale, Cupertino, and north San Jose. The city is home to nineteen K–8, elementary, and high schools. Many of the schools are named for former farmers, ranchers, and other notable Santa Clara residents such as Bowers and Bracher elementary schools, Buchser Middle School, Wilcox High School, Santa Clara High School, and Mission Early College High School.

A small part of the city however is within the Cupertino Union Elementary School District and the Fremont Union High School District. This section is zoned to Cupertino High School and its feeder schools in the nearby town of its namesake.

Another piece of the city is in the Campbell Union Elementary School District and the Campbell Union High School District.

Private schools in Santa Clara include three Catholic schools operated by the Roman Catholic Diocese of San Jose — Saint Clare School (the oldest elementary school in California), Saint Lawrence Elementary and Middle School, and Saint Justin School — and the Granada Islamic School (Islamic school, grades K-12).

=== Higher education ===
Colleges and universities in Santa Clara include Santa Clara University (private Jesuit university), Mission College (public community college), UC Santa Cruz Silicon Valley extension campus, and Golden State Baptist College (private Baptist college).

== Culture ==
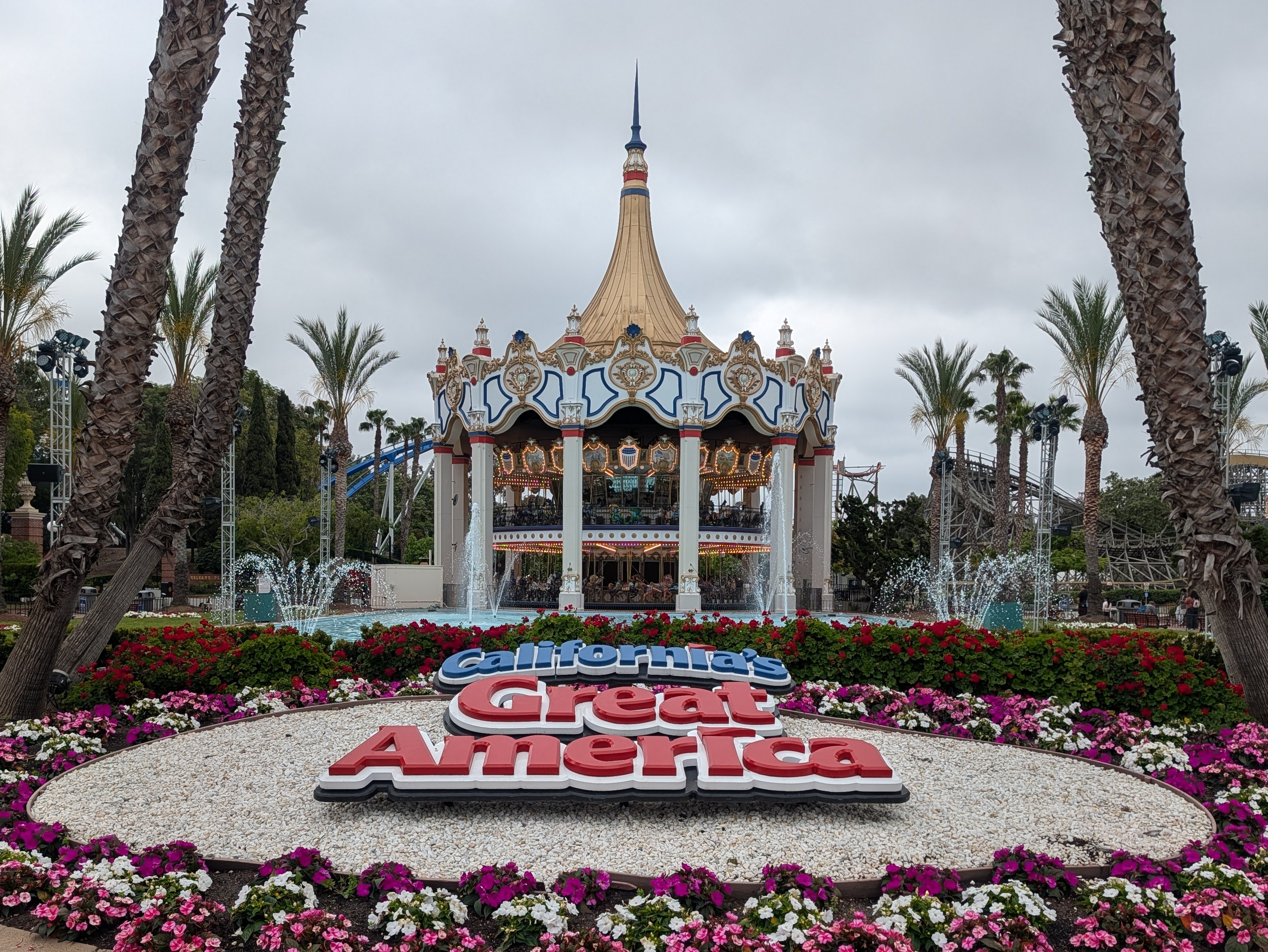
California's Great America

Santa Clara is also home to California's Great America, an amusement park currently operated by Six Flags.

Nearby is the Santa Clara Convention Center, one of Silicon Valley's largest event and meeting venues. Santa Clara also offers several museums such as the Intel Museum, Triton Museum of Art, and the Harris–Lass House Museum. The Our Lady of Peace Shrine is notable for its 32-foot-tall (9.8 m) statue which is visible from Highway 101. The Mission City Center for Performing Arts is the city's venue for theatrical productions and entertainment.

=== Sports ===
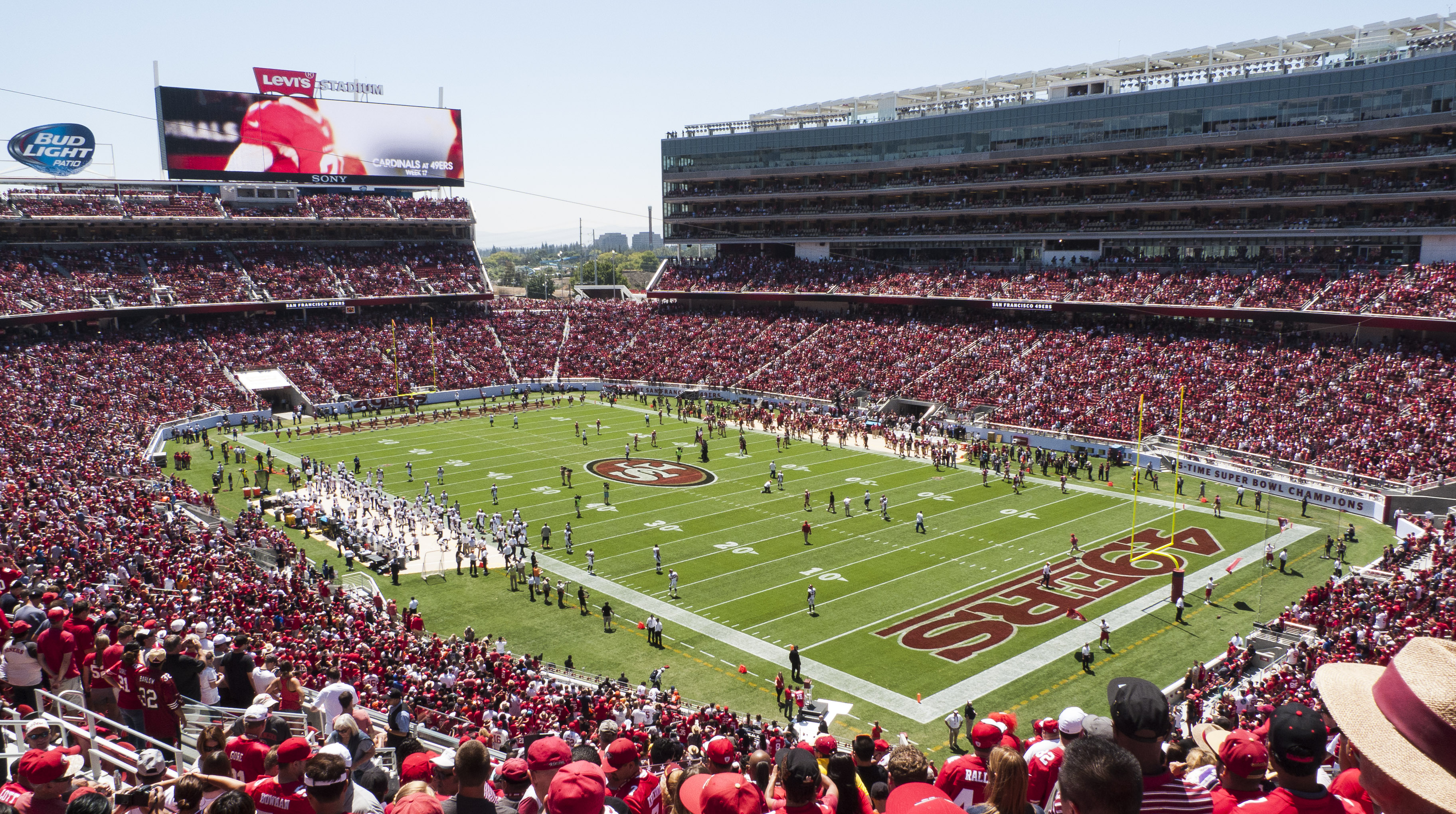
Levi's Stadium, home of the San Francisco 49ers

The Santa Clara Broncos are the Division I NCAA athletic programs of Santa Clara University. Santa Clara sponsors 19 different teams, most of which compete in the West Coast Conference. The red and white of the Santa Clara Broncos is featured on the flag of the city, as is the Mission which lies at the heart of the campus.

The George F. Haines International Swim Center is home and host to numerous local, regional, and international competitive swimming matches.

The Santa Clara Vanguard, a competitive marching music organization, has been headquartered in Santa Clara since its inception. The organization runs and operates a winter guard, an indoor percussion ensemble, and two drum and bugle corps, all of which compete across the country every year. All four ensembles have been very successful competitively, especially the two drum corps, one of which has won 6 Open Class titles and the other 7 World Class titles.

The San Francisco 49ers National Football League football team has its headquarters and practice facilities in Santa Clara. On Wednesday, November 8, 2006, the 49ers announced their intention to move the team to Santa Clara in time for the fall 2014 season, after negotiations failed with the city of San Francisco to build a new stadium. On February 8, 2026, Super Bowl LX was held at the 49ers home stadium, Levi's Stadium.

Santa Clara hosted multiple matches during the 2026 FIFA World Cup at Levi's Stadium.

== Transportation ==
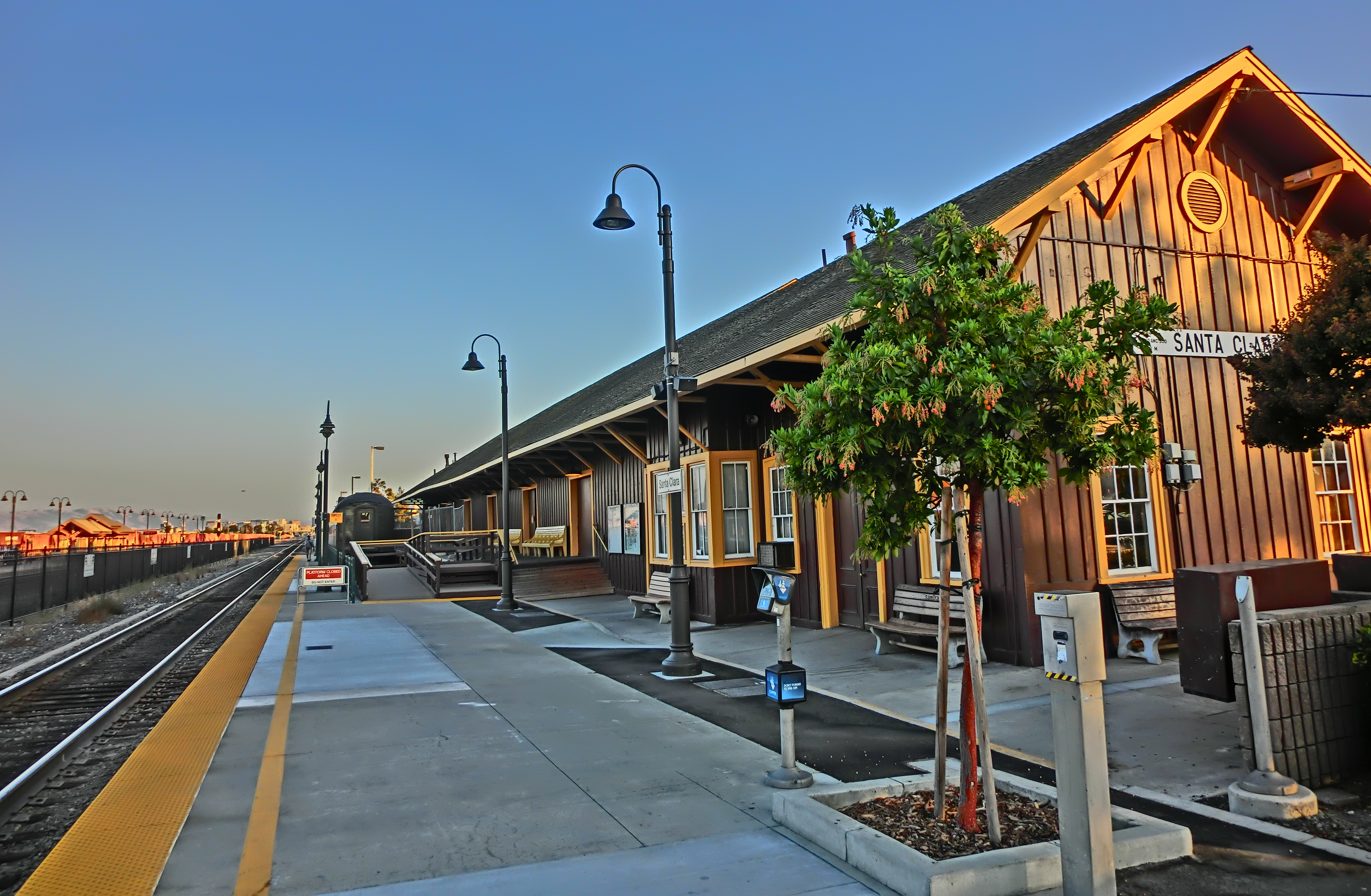
Downtown Santa Clara station, served by Caltrain, ACE, and Amtrak

Santa Clara has two major train stations: the Santa Clara–Great America station and the Downtown Santa Clara station. Both stations are served by Amtrak's Capitol Corridor train and the Altamont Corridor Express (ACE); the latter is also served by Caltrain.

The city is served by the VTA light rail system, which operates four stations: Reamwood station, Old Ironsides station, Great America station, and Lick Mill station.

Santa Clara is adjacent to San Jose International Airport.

== Sister cities ==
As of May 2015, Santa Clara has three sister cities:

- Coimbra, Portugal
- Izumo, Shimane, Japan
- (Republic of Ireland) Limerick, Ireland

== See also ==
- List of cities and towns in the San Francisco Bay Area
