= Saratoga Creek =

Stream in California, United States

Saratoga Creek Arroyo Quito, Quito Creek, Campbell Creek, Big Moody Creek, San Jon Creek
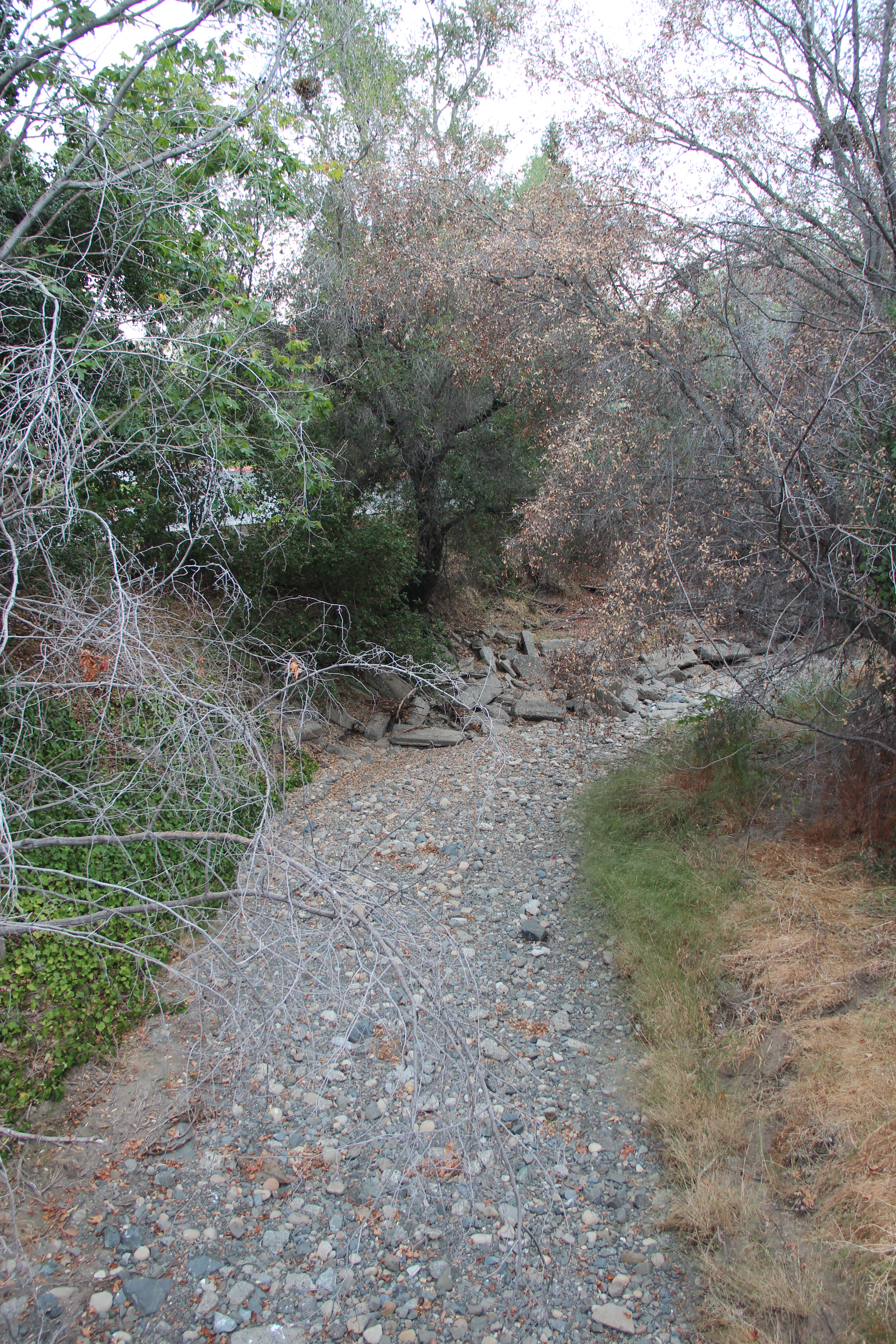
- A dry Saratoga Creek in 2015

- Location of the mouth of Saratoga Creek in California

Location
- Country: United States
- State: California
- City: Saratoga, Cupertino, San Jose, Santa Clara, Alviso, Sunnyvale

Physical characteristics
- Source
  - location: Saratoga, California, Santa Clara County, California
  - coordinates: 37°15′14″N 122°06′15″W
  - elevation: 2,050 ft (620 m)
- Mouth: Guadalupe Slough
  - location: Confluence with Calabazas Creek to form Guadalupe Slough in Sunnyvale, California
  - coordinates: 37°25′02″N 121°59′12″W
  - elevation: 6.7 ft (2.0 m)

Basin features
- Tributaries
  - right: Booker Creek, Bonjetti Creek, Congress Springs CreekSan Tomas Aquinas Creek, Calabazas Creek

Saratoga Creek is a 19.8 miles (31.9 km) north-northeast flowing creek in Santa Clara County, California, that flows to the Guadalupe Slough and south San Francisco Bay.

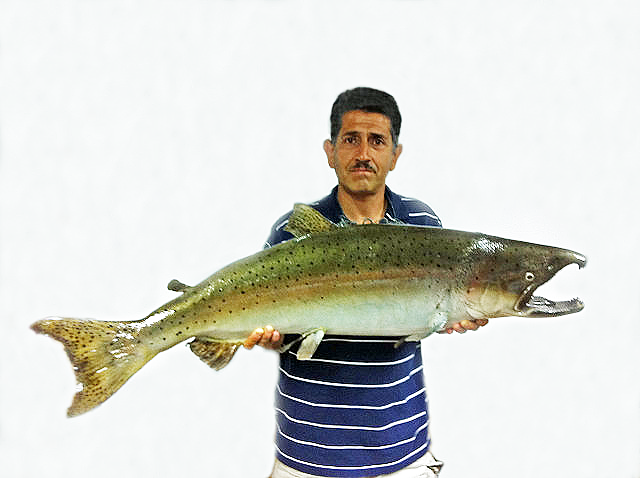
Roger Castillo, a founder of the Salmon and Steelhead Restoration Group, with a huge Chinook salmon (Oncorhynchus tshawytscha), now a taxidermy wall mount specimen, that he recovered from Saratoga Creek below Highway 237 in mid-October 1996

== History ==
Saratoga Creek was originally called Arroyo Quito and then Campbell Creek after immigrant William Campbell, who operated a sawmill in 1848 in "Campbell's Redwoods" about three miles west of Saratoga, California, and also a stage station in 1852. The town of Campbell was founded by his son, Benjamin Campbell, in 1885. Other names for the creek included Big Moody Creek and San Jon Creek. The Board of Geographic Names officially decided on Saratoga Creek in May, 1954.

== Watershed ==
Saratoga Creek originates on the northeastern slopes of the Santa Cruz Mountains along Castle Rock Ridge at an elevation of 2,050 feet (620 m). The mainstem flows for approximately 4.5 miles (7.2 km) in an eastern direction through forested terrain, largely contained within Sanborn County Park. It continues for about 1.5 miles through the low-density residential foothill region of the City of Saratoga and then for another 13.8 miles along the alluvial plain of the Santa Clara Valley, through the cities of San Jose and Santa Clara characterized by high-density residential neighborhoods. Saratoga Creek. It receives waters from its San Tomas Aquinas Creek tributary in Santa Clara and then flows to the Alviso and Sunnvyale border where it is joined by Calabazas Creek just before joining the Guadalupe Slough in the northeast corner of Sunnyvale, passing just to the east and north of the Sunnyvale Water Pollution Control Ponds. Guadalupe Slough then proceeds into south San Francisco Bay, .

Historically, Saratoga Creek and its San Tomas Aquino Creek tributary, and Calabazas Creek, were tributaries of the Guadalupe River upstream of Alviso. However, by 1876 the Guadalupe River had been moved from the Guadalupe Slough to connect to the more navigable Alviso Slough, making Saratoga Creek a direct tributary to the Guadalupe Slough. The historic watershed can be viewed in the Thompson and West 1876 maps. Thus, today Guadalupe Slough still receives the old tributaries of the Guadalupe River, Saratoga Creek and its San Tomas Aquino sub-tributary, and Calabazas Creek.

Upstream of Santa Clara, major tributaries of Saratoga Creek include Booker, Bonjetti and Congress Springs Creeks. Tributaries of Bonjetti Creek include McElroy Creek, Todd Creek, and Sanborn Creek. Congress Springs Creek was also known as Congress Hall Creek and is named for Congress Springs and the famous Congress Hall resort in Saratoga Springs, New York. California's Congress Hall resort at Congress Springs attracted tourists to the area until it burned down in 1903.

Most of Saratoga Creek contains natural channel with some modifications (e.g., gabion walls) and a few sections of hardened channel.

== Ecology ==
Historically steelhead trout (coastal rainbow trout) (Oncorhyncus mykiss irideus) migrated from San Francisco Bay to spawn in Saratoga Creek and its tributaries. An 1877 report in the Sportsman Gazetteer touted the Congress Springs ("Congress Hall") tributary to San Franciscans for trout fishing. J. O. Snyder reported steelhead trout in Campbell Creek (now Saratoga Creek) in 1905. An impassable barrier at the confluence of San Tomas Aquino and Saratoga Creeks prevents salmonid fish passage to both creeks. However, stream resident rainbow trout are still found in Saratoga Creek. Recent genetic analysis has shown that the surviving rainbow trout are of native origin and not hatchery stock.

Recently, three of the originally native fish species have been collected from the creek including California roach (Lavinia symmetricus), Sacramento sucker (Catostomus occidentalis occidentalis) and rainbow trout.

Physical proof of the historic presence of Golden beaver (Castor canadensis) in south San Francisco Bay tributaries is a Castor canadensis subauratus skull in the Smithsonian Institution National Museum of Natural History collected by zoologist James Graham Cooper in Santa Clara, California on Dec. 31, 1855. Cooper lived in Mountain View, California from October to December 1855 and collected most of his specimens on Saratoga Creek (then Quito Creek).

The upper portions of the Saratoga Creek watershed are vegetated with broadleaved upland forest, especially mixed evergreen forest, including Coast redwood (Sequoia sempervirens) and Coast Douglas fir (Pseudotsuga menziesii var. menziesii), and chaparral. Common riparian tree species along the upper reaches of Saratoga Creek include White alder (Alnus rhombifolia), Big Leaf maple (Acer macrophyllum), and California bay (Umbellularia californica). Native riparian plant species occurring along the lower portions of Saratoga Creek (from Monroe Street to Lawrence Expressway) include arroyo willow, box elder, Fremont cottonwood, western sycamore, red willow, yellow willow, blue elderberry, coffeeberry, coyote brush, and mule fat. Nonnative weedy species are common.

== See also ==
List of watercourses in the San Francisco Bay Area
