= Silicon Valley Power =

Municipal electric utility in California

- Type: Public
- Industry: Energy and utility
- Founded: 1896
- Headquarters: Santa Clara, California
- Key Executive: Manuel Pineda, Chief Electric Utility Officer
- Products: Electricity
- Peak Demand: 587.8 megawatts
- Operating Revenue: 422.9 million (CY 2019)
- Owner(s): City of Santa Clara
- Employees: 198
- Website: www.siliconvalleypower.com

Silicon Valley Power (SVP) is a not-for-profit municipal electric utility owned and operated by the City of Santa Clara, California, United States. SVP provides electricity service to approximately 55,116 residential and business customers, including large corporations such as Intel, Applied Materials, Owens Corning and NVIDIA. SVP also owns and maintains a dark fiber network named SVP Fiber Enterprise.

== History ==
The City of Santa Clara electric department was founded in 1896 when it installed 46 streetlights powered by a direct current generator. From January 1904 to 1965, the electric department began purchasing energy for resale to Santa Clara's customers from the United Gas and Electric Company of San Jose, which later became part of Pacific Gas and Electric Company (PG&E). PG&E supplied Santa Clara's electric needs until 1965, when the electric department began to purchase its power from the Central Valley Project (CVP), supervised by the United States Bureau of Reclamation. In 1968, Santa Clara became a founding member of the Northern California Power Agency (NCPA) to work with other municipal electric utilities to jointly develop cost-effective energy sources.

In 1980, the Santa Clara electric department became an energy-producing utility for the first time since 1903 when it launched its own 6-megawatt (MW) cogeneration project, the first of three natural gas-fueled electricity generation plants in the City of Santa Clara. In 1983, Santa Clara and its NCPA partners became the first cities in the U.S. to invest in and operate a publicly owned geothermal plant, the 110 MW NCPA Geothermal Project, which is one of the 22 geothermal power plants at The Geysers, with Santa Clara having a 55% ownership interest.

In 1998, the Santa Clara electric department was renamed Silicon Valley Power (SVP). Subsequent efforts to expand and diversify its electricity supply led to the construction of the Donald Von Raesfeld combined cycle natural gas plant (2005), various partnerships in wind and hydroelectric generation sources, and 25 percent ownership of the Lodi Energy Center combined cycle natural gas plant (2012).

In 2007, SVP launched Santa Clara Green Power to provide residents and businesses with the option to use only renewable energy. In 2012, over 38 percent of the electricity distributed by SVP was from green resources. In addition, the City owns an extensive dark fiber optic network to serve business customers. The SVP Fiber Enterprise is a department of SVP.

SVP introduced two new services in 2013. Santa Clara was provided free citywide outdoor Wi-Fi access via an AMI wireless system branded as SVP MeterConnect, and helped fund electric vehicle (EV) charging stations at the Central Park Library and the Santa Clara Convention Center. SVP's complete AMI project is being rolled out in the 2015–2016 time frame.

== Power portfolio ==
In 2023, the SVP power mix consisted of 36.9% from eligible renewable resources as defined by the California Energy Commission, 11.7% from large hydroelectric, 36.6% from natural gas, 1.8% from coal, and 3.8% from unspecified sources. Total kilowatt-hour (kWh) retail sales in 2024 were 4,700,419,189 kWh.

== Facilities ==
Generating facilities owned by the City of Santa Clara and located in the city provided 32.5 percent of the electricity consumed in Santa Clara. Natural gas-fueled facilities are the Donald Von Raesfeld natural gas power plant (147.8 MW), Gianera Generating Station (49.5 MW) and Cogeneration Plant #1 (7 MW). In addition, power is also generated by the Jenny Strand Solar Research and Development Park (100 kW), the Tasman Parking Structure Solar PV (400 kW) and by the capture and burning of methane gas from a closed City of Santa Clara landfill (750 kW). SVP also owns a 230-kilovolt (kV) transmission line that brings electricity into the city from non-local sources.

Generating sources owned by SVP and located outside the city include the Stony Creek Hydroelectric System and Grizzly Hydroelectric Project.

Joint Power Agencies (JPA) of which SVP is a member include the NCPA (hydroelectric, natural gas. SVP also contracts to receive electricity through power purchase agreements with entities such as Iberdrola and Seawest LLC (wind); Western Area Power Association, Tri-Dam Project, Friant Power Authority (hydroelectric); Recurrent Energy (solar); and G2 Energy and Ameresco (landfill gas).

SVP receives generation produced outside Santa Clara via transmission facilities owned and operated by PG&E under the direction of the California Independent System Operator (CAISO). SVP also participates in the Transmission Agency of Northern California (TANC), which is interconnected to PG&E's transmission facilities.

== Regulatory agencies ==
SVP must adhere to the laws and regulations of the U.S. and the State of California and is involved, in various ways, with multiple entities, including: Federal Energy Regulatory Commission (FERC); North American Electric Reliability Corporation (NERC); California Energy Commission (CEC); CAISO; California Division of Occupational Safety and Health (Cal/OSHA); Bay Area Air Quality Management District; California Department of Toxic Substances Control; California Department of Transportation; and the California Air Resources Board.

== Executives ==
The City of Santa Clara City Council has governing authority over SVP via the city manager and the Director of Electric Utility, who reports to the city manager.
