= Calabazas Creek (Santa Clara County) =

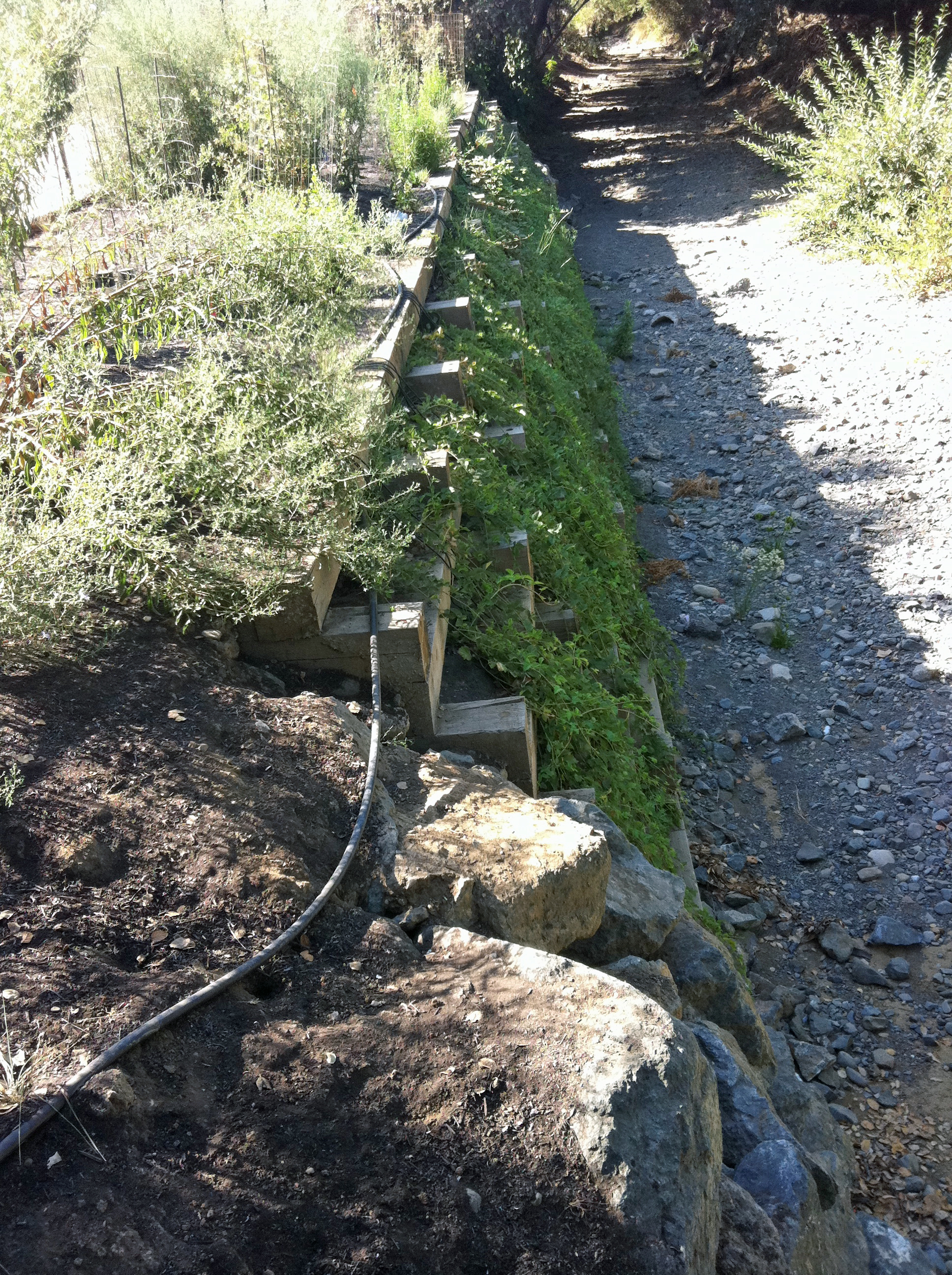
- Creek bank restored by SCVWD with timber cribs and native plants next to Calabazas Park north of Rainbow Drive, San Jose, California.

- Location of the mouth of Calabazas Creek in California

Location
- Country: United States
- State: California
- Region: Santa Clara County
- Cities: Saratoga, San Jose, Cupertino, Santa Clara, Sunnyvale

Physical characteristics
- Source: Table Mountain in the Santa Cruz Mountains
  - location: Saratoga, California
  - coordinates: 37°16′12″N 122°03′45″W
  - elevation: 636 ft (194 m)
- Mouth: Southwest San Francisco Bay
  - location: Confluence with Saratoga Creek in Sunnyvale, California
  - coordinates: 37°25′02″N 121°59′12″W
  - elevation: 6.7 ft (2.0 m)

Basin features
- Tributaries
  - left: Prospect Creek, Regnart Creek
  - right: Rodeo Creek

Calabazas Creek is a 13.7-mile-long (22.0 km) northeast by northward-flowing stream originating on Table Mountain in Saratoga, California in Santa Clara County, California, United States. It courses through the cities of Saratoga, San Jose, Cupertino, Santa Clara and merges with Saratoga Creek in Sunnyvale, where it enters the Guadalupe Slough and thence to south San Francisco Bay.

== History ==
In the Spanish language, calabazas means squash, pumpkins or gourds. The name was especially popular to the south of San Francisco Bay.

== Watershed and course ==
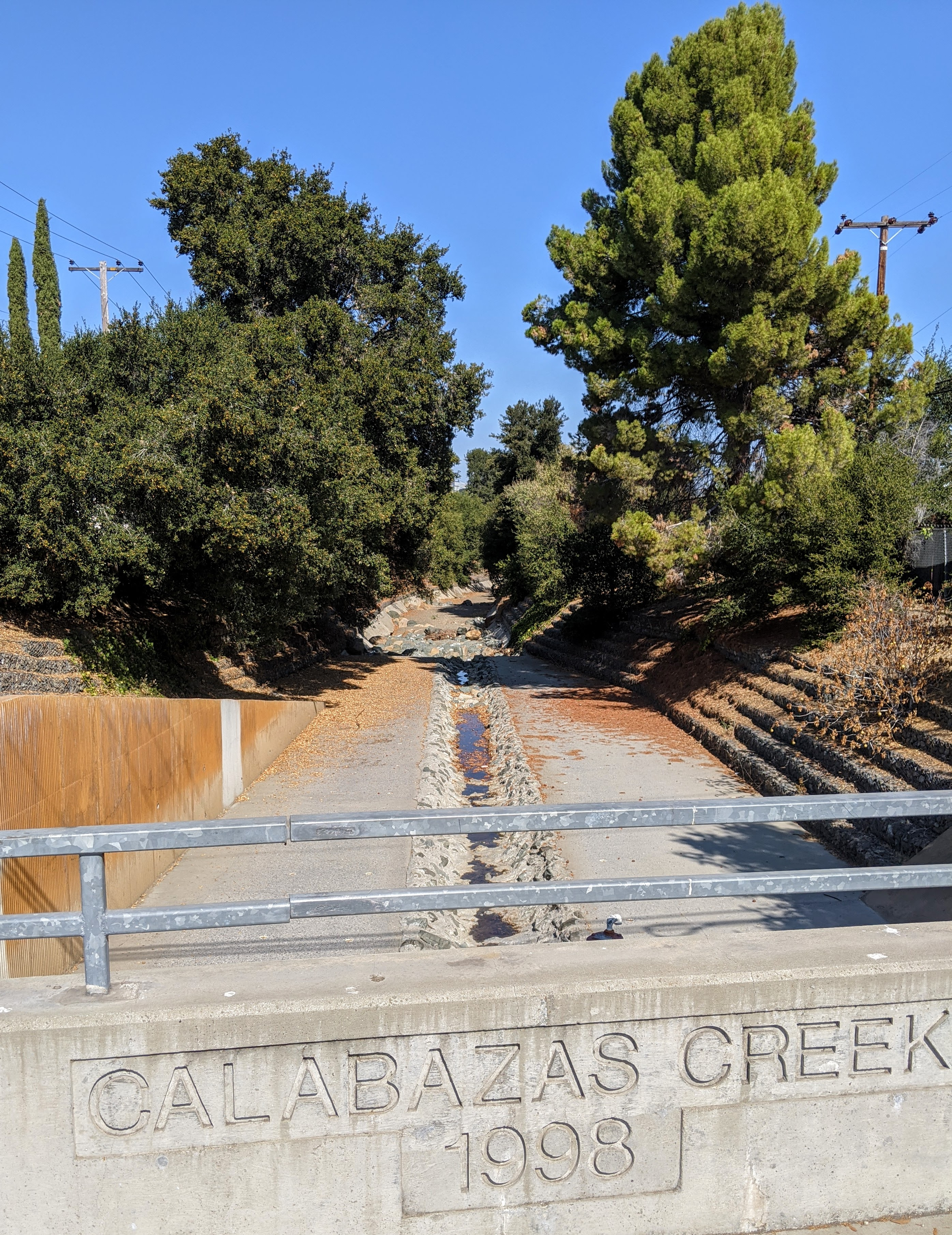
Calabazas Creek at Pruneridge Avenue, Santa Clara

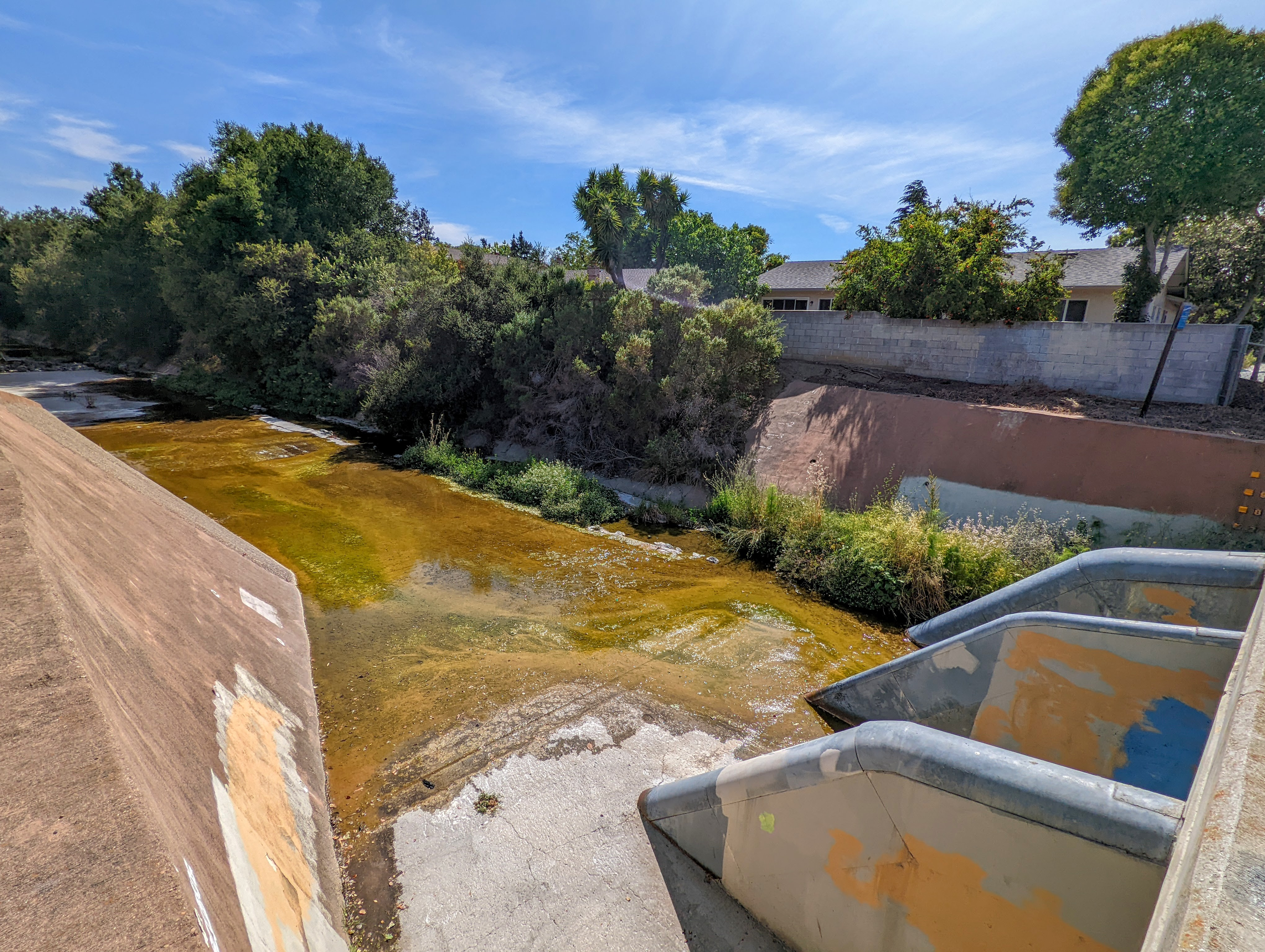
Calabazas Creek at Lochinvar Avenue, Sunnyvale

An unnamed tributary of Calabazas Creek starts at an elevation of 1,714 feet (522 m) on Table Mountain, whose summit is at 2,037 feet (621 m) and located at 37°15'30" N and 122°04' 55" W, although the creek's official USGS source is at 794 feet (242 m) and located at 37°16'29" N and 122°04'07" W. The Calabazas Creek watershed drains 20.3 square miles (53 km^{2}). Named tributaries of Calabazas Creek include Prospect, Rodeo and Regnart Creeks. Prospect Creek flows 1.4 miles before entering Calabazas Creek from the left (heading downstream) at elevation 325 feet, then Rodeo Creek from the right, and finally, Regnart Creek joins at elevation 226 feet. Historically Calabazas Creek was a tributary of Saratoga Creek joining it just downstream of San Francisco Road (probably El Camino Real) on the Thompson and West 1876 map, and thence to the Guadalupe River. When the Guadalupe River was redirected from Guadalupe Slough to Alviso Slough (formerly Steamboat Slough), Calabazas Creek was extended directly to meet Saratoga Creek at the beginning of Guadalupe Slough at Sunnyvale Baylands Park in Sunnyvale.

Thirty-two percent of its length, approximately 4.2 miles, is classified as "hard bottom" and the reach between Highway 101 and Lawrence Expressway is a trapezoidal, concrete-lined channel. From Guadalupe Slough to Highway 101, Calabazas Creek is an enlarged earthen channel with levees. In 2010, the Calabazas Creek Flood Control Project was started by the Santa Clara Valley Water District (SCVWD) to enlarge the culvert undercrossing at Saratoga-Sunnyvale Road, widen the Union Pacific Railroad (UPRR) bridge, and construct a detention area adjacent to the creek north of Saratoga-Sunnyvale Road, with bank erosion repair at dozens of locations along 3.7 miles of the creek from Miller Avenue to Wardell Road (and was extended to include the Comer Debris Basin and Comer Drive. The culvert at Saratoga-Sunnyvale Road was widened and the upstream detention basin completed in September, 2011.

== Habitat and wildlife ==
Steelhead trout (coastal rainbow trout) (Oncorhynchus mykiss irideus) occurred historically in Calabazas Creek but have not been seen since the 1970s. Leidy (2005) identified at least several impassable barriers to migration upstream from the Bay including a 13 feet (4.0 m) inclined dam at Comer Drive, and drop structures at Bollinger Road and Rainbow Drive. The latter two have now been removed, and the Comer Dam, which was constructed in 1973 to trap gravel and cement debris from the upstream Cocciardi Quarry (closed for several years now), has raised the creek to within four feet of the underside of Comer Drive bridge posing a flooding threat to the bridge. It was scheduled to be removed by the SCVWD.

Leidy (2007) identified three species of native fishes in Calabazas Creek: California roach, Sacramento sucker, Three-spined stickleback (Gasterosteus aculeatus), and rainbow trout (Oncohrynchus mykiss) (now extirpated). Non-native fishes include goldfish (Carassius auratus auratus) and Western mosquitofish (Gambusia affinis).

== See also ==
- List of watercourses in the San Francisco Bay Area
